= Northern Xinjiang railway =

Railway line in Xinjiang Uyghur Autonomous Region, China

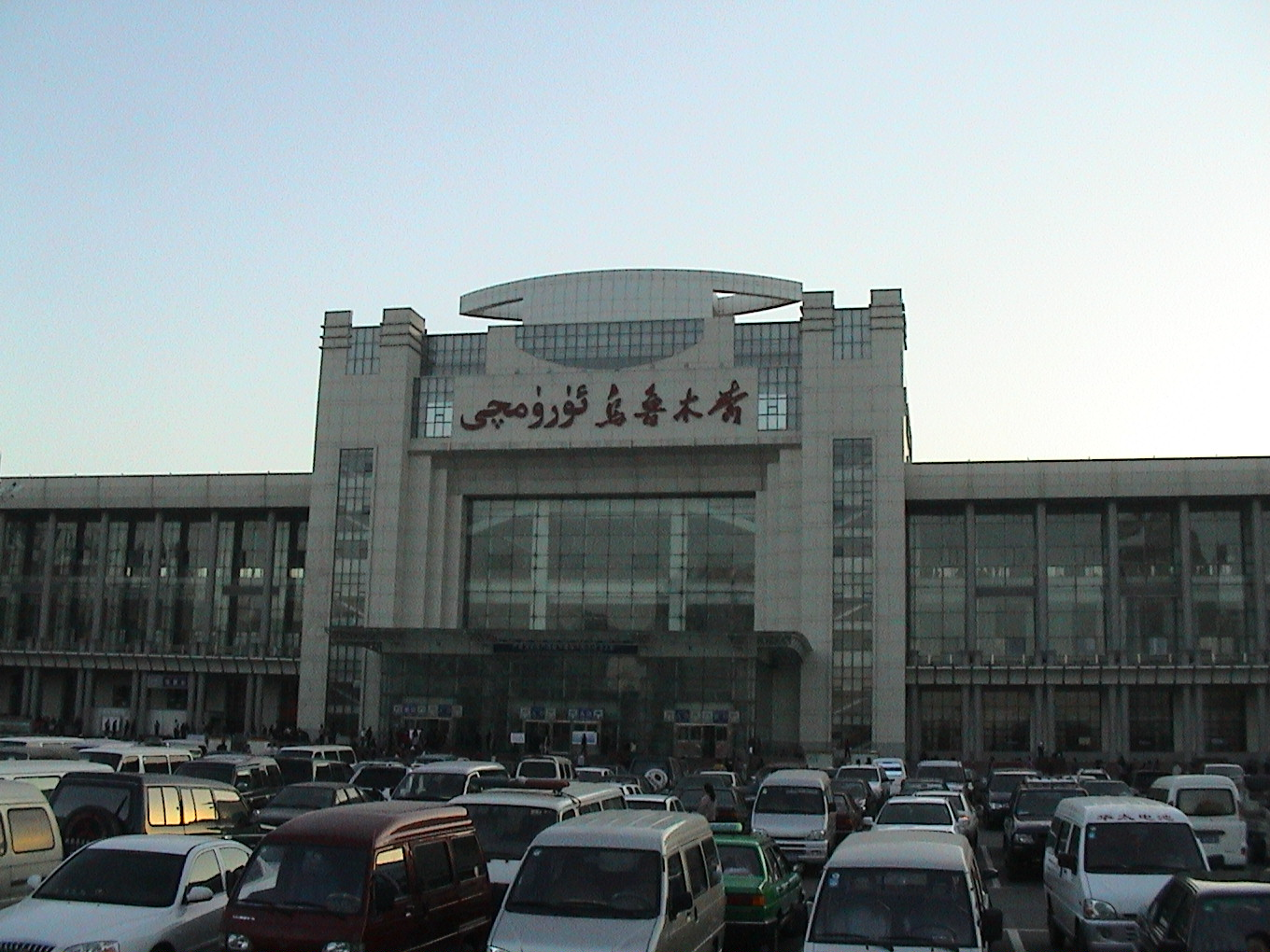
- Ürümqi South station

Overview
- Native name: 北疆铁路
- Locale: Xinjiang, China
- Termini: Ürümqi; Alashankou
- Stations: 38

Service
- Type: Railway
- System: Trans-Eurasian Railway

History
- Opened: 1992

Technical
- Line length: 460 km (290 mi)
- Track gauge: 1,435 mm (4 ft 8 1/2 in) standard gauge
- Electrification: 25 kV 50 Hz AC overhead catenary

The Northern Xinjiang railway or Beijiang railway (Chinese: 北疆铁路) is a railway in Xinjiang, China, between Ürümqi, the regional capital of Xinjiang, and Alashankou on the border with Kazakhstan. The railway is 460 km (290 mi) in length and runs along the northern slope of the Tian Shan mountain range, connecting all major cities and towns of the southern Junggar Basin, including Changji, Hutubi, Manas, Shihezi, Kuytun, Wusu, Bortala (Bole), Jinghe and Alashankou. The line extends the Lanzhou–Xinjiang railway west from Ürümqi to the Turkestan–Siberia railway on the Kazakh border and forms a section of the Trans-Eurasian Railway from Rotterdam to Lianyungang. The line opened in 1992. It was partially funded by a government loan from the Soviet Union.

A new double-track line between Ürümqi and Jinghe was built in 2009 to supplement the Northern Xinjiang railway. It is sometimes referred to as the Second Ürümqi–Jinghe railway.

The Northern Xinjiang, Kuytun–Beitun, Altay–Fuyun–Zhundong, and Ürümqi–Dzungaria railways form a loop.

== Branches ==
The Kuytun–Beitun branch and the Jinghe–Yining–Khorgas branch were opened in 2009.

== List of stations ==
Station	Chinese	Distance (km)	Location	
Ürümqi South _{Lanzhou-Xinjiang HSR} _{Lanzhou–Xinjiang Railway}	乌鲁木齐南		Saybag	Ürümqi
Ürümqi _{Lanzhou-Xinjiang HSR} _{Lanzhou–Xinjiang Railway}	乌鲁木齐		Xinshi	Ürümqi
Wuxi _{Ürümqi–Dzungaria Railway}	乌西		Toutunhe	Ürümqi
Sanping	三坪		Ürümqi County	Ürümqi
Changji	昌吉		Changji	Changji Prefecture
Junhu	军户		Changji	Changji Prefecture
Xiaotugule	小土古里		Changji	Changji Prefecture
Hutubi	呼图壁		Hutubi County	Changji Prefecture
Wugongtai	五工台		Hutubi County	Changji Prefecture
Dafeng	大丰		Hutubi County	Changji Prefecture
Letuyi	乐土驿		Manas County	Changji Prefecture
Baojiadian	包家店		Manas County	Changji Prefecture
Manas	玛纳斯		Manas County	Changji Prefecture
Shihezi	石河子		Shihezi	XPCC
Ulanusu	乌兰乌苏		Shawan County	Tacheng Prefecture
Songshenggong	宋圣宫		Shawan County	Tacheng Prefecture
Shawan	沙湾		Shawan County	Tacheng Prefecture
Anku	安库		Shawan County	Tacheng Prefecture
Anjihai	安集海		Shawan County	Tacheng Prefecture
Kaiganqi	开干齐		Kuytun	Ili Prefecture
Kuytun East	奎屯东		Kuytun	Ili Prefecture
Kuytun _{Kuytun–Beitun Railway}	奎屯		Kuytun	Ili Prefecture
Kuytun West	奎屯西		Kuytun	Ili Prefecture
Usu	乌苏		Usu	Tacheng Prefecture
Ganhezi	甘河子		Usu	Tacheng Prefecture
Sikeshu	四棵树		Usu	Tacheng Prefecture
Gaoquan	高泉		Usu	Tacheng Prefecture
Gehe	古河		Usu	Tacheng Prefecture
Gurtu	古尔图		Usu	Tacheng Prefecture
Tuotuo	托托		Jinghe County	Bortala Prefecture
Yilisheng	伊里生		Jinghe County	Bortala Prefecture
Shaquanzi	沙泉子		Jinghe County	Bortala Prefecture
Jinghe _{Jinghe–Yining–Khorgas Railway}	精河		Jinghe County	Bortala Prefecture
Mogutan	蘑菇滩		Jinghe County	Bortala Prefecture
Aibihu	艾比湖		Jinghe County	Bortala Prefecture
Bole _{Bozhou railway}	博乐		Bole	Bortala Prefecture
Wulandabusen	乌兰达布森		Bole	Bortala Prefecture
Alashankou _{Kazakhstan Turkestan–Siberia Railway}	阿拉山口		Alashankou	Bortala Prefecture

== Gallery ==
The Northern Xinjiang Railway

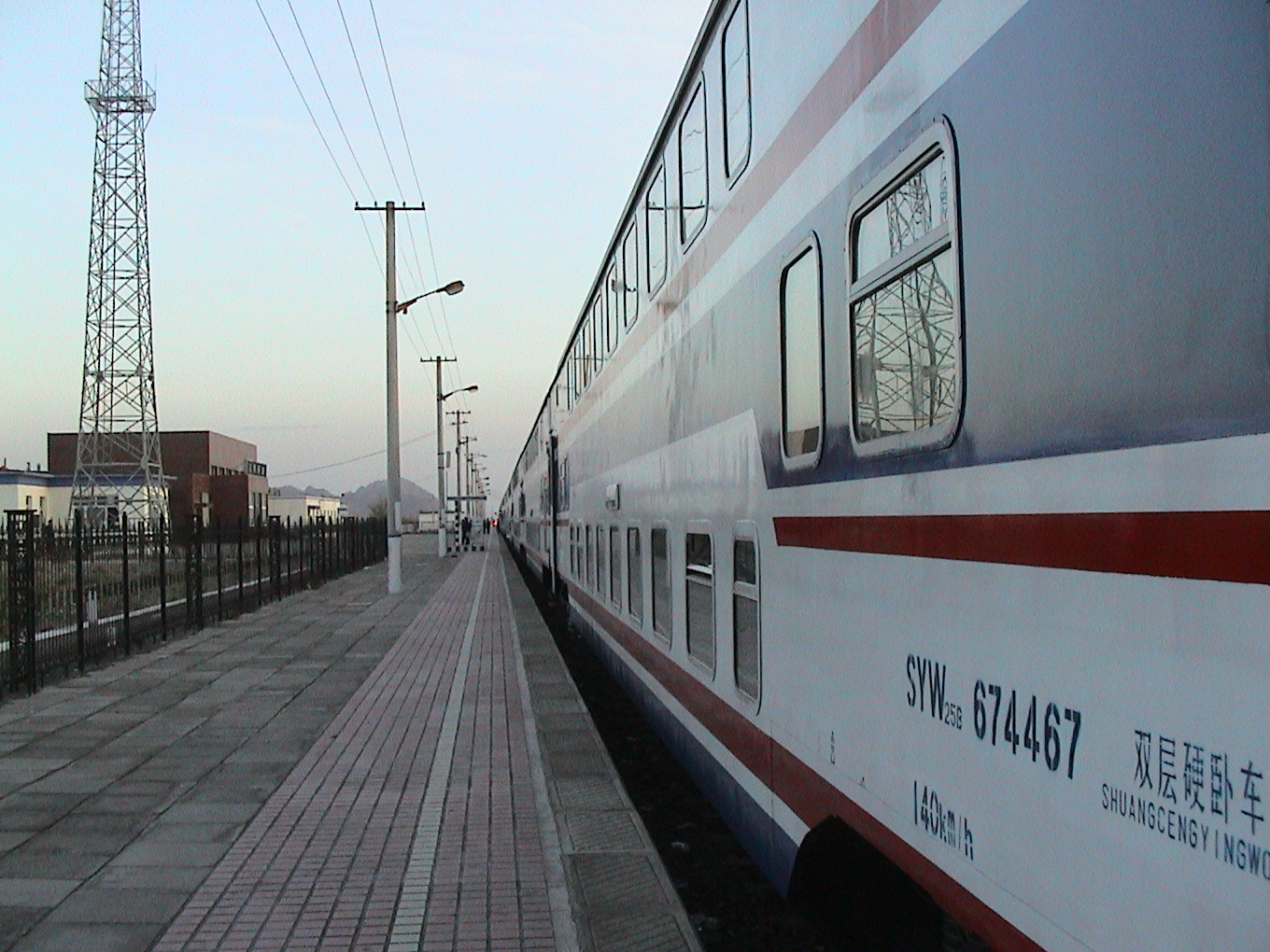
Train No. 5801, a double-decker sleeper train, from Ürümqi-Alashankou at the Bole station in April 2006

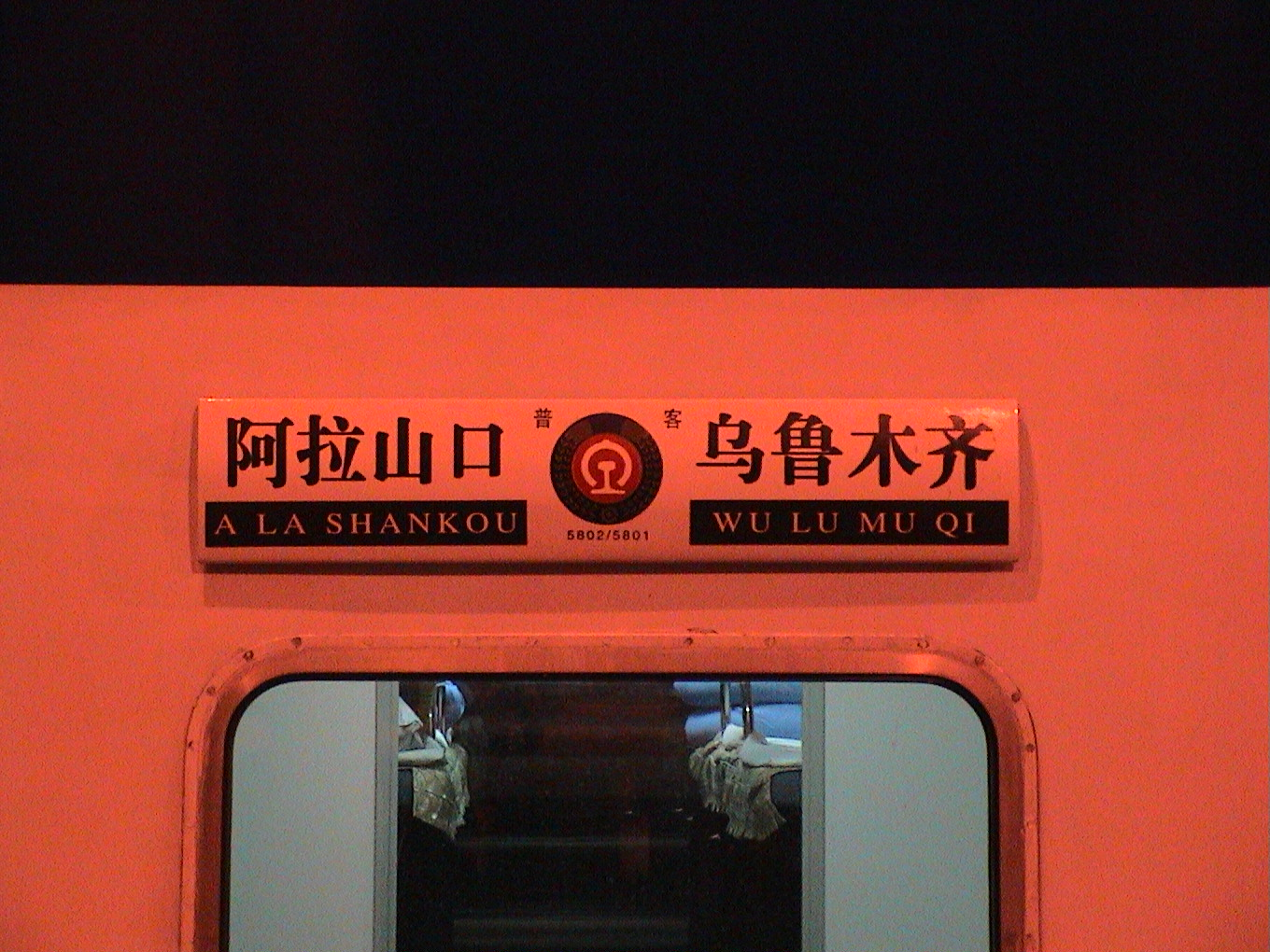
The Ürümqi to Alashankou Train (No. 5601/6502)

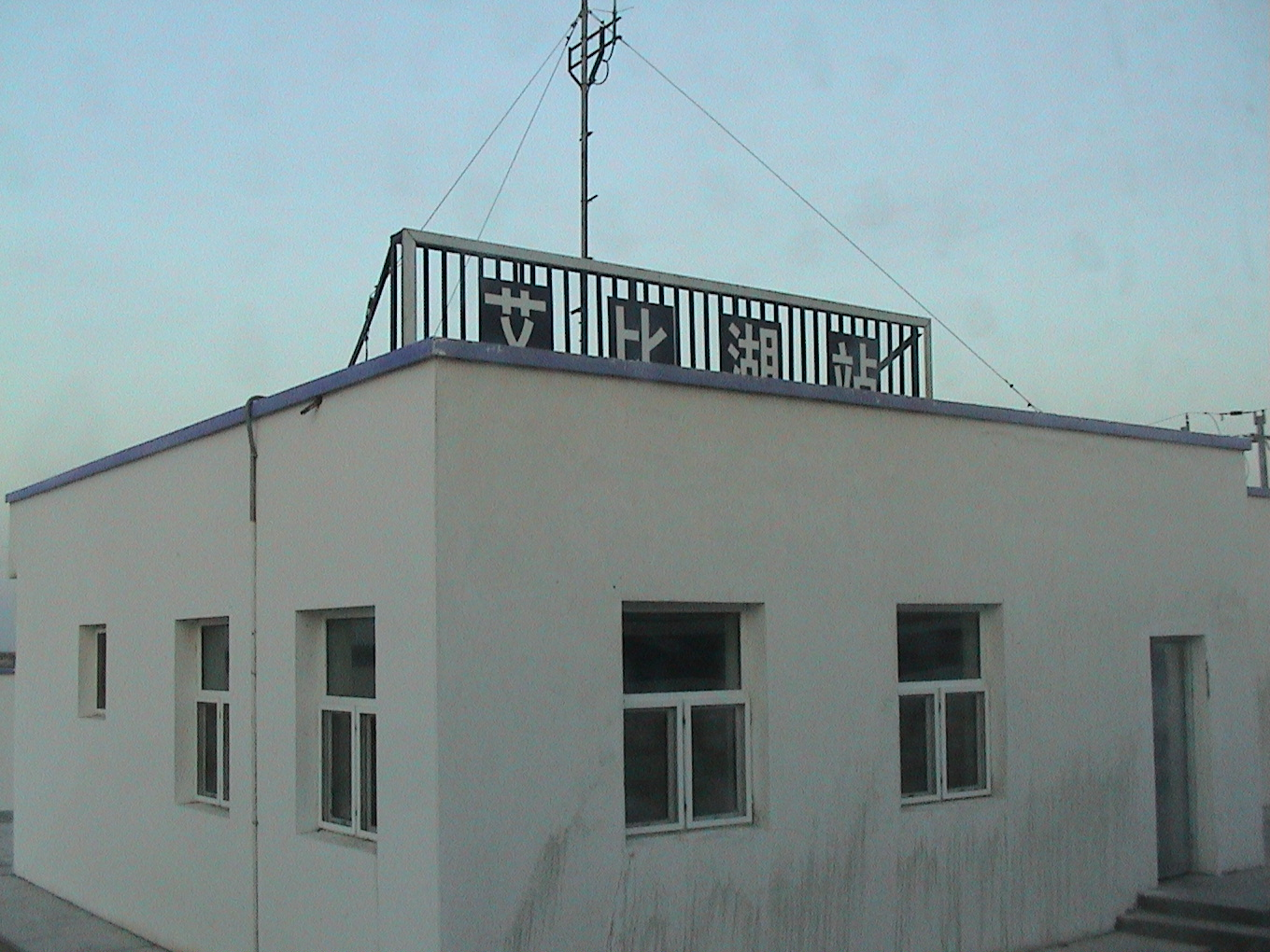
Aibihu (Ebi-Nur) station

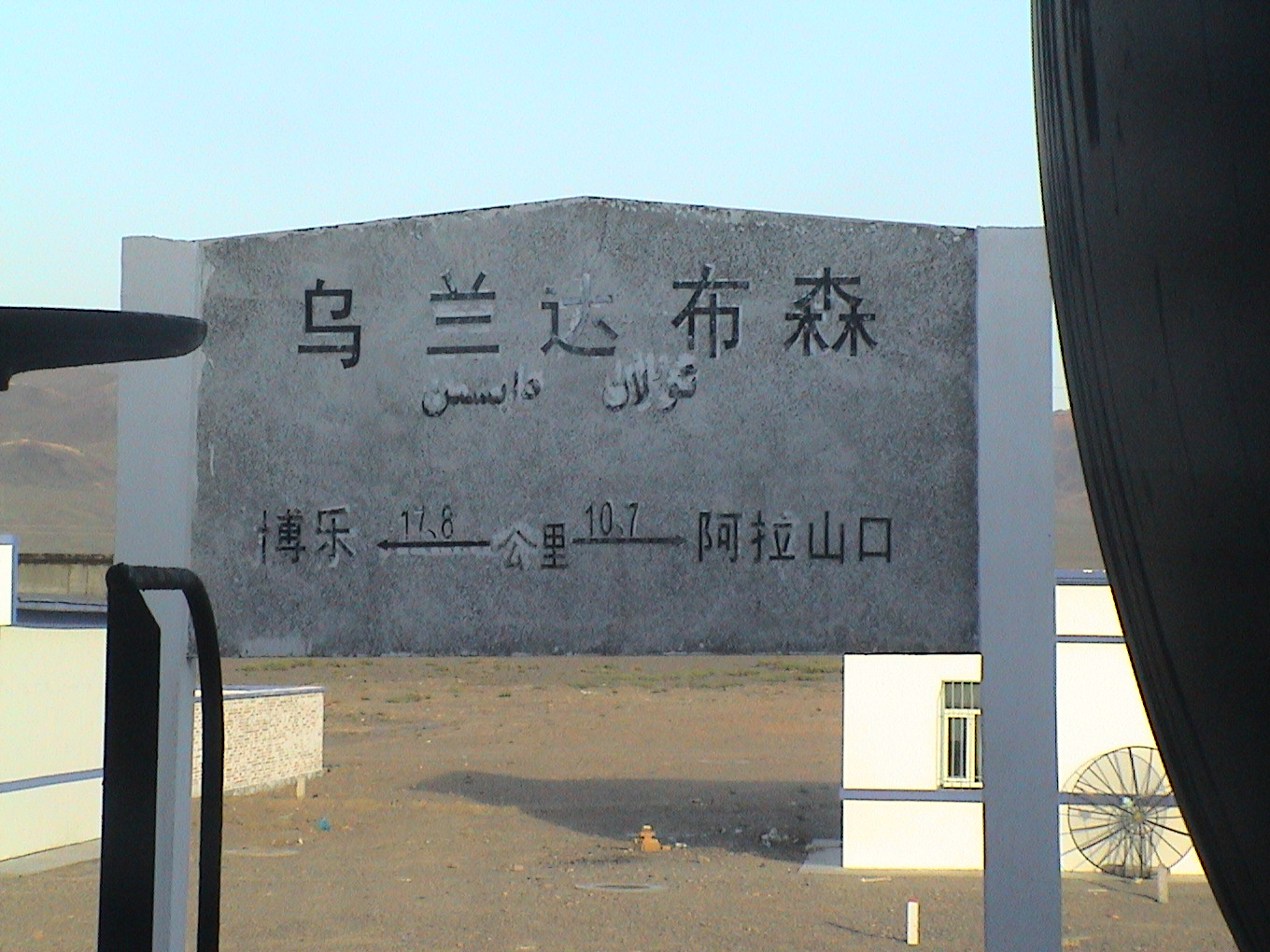
Wulandabusen station

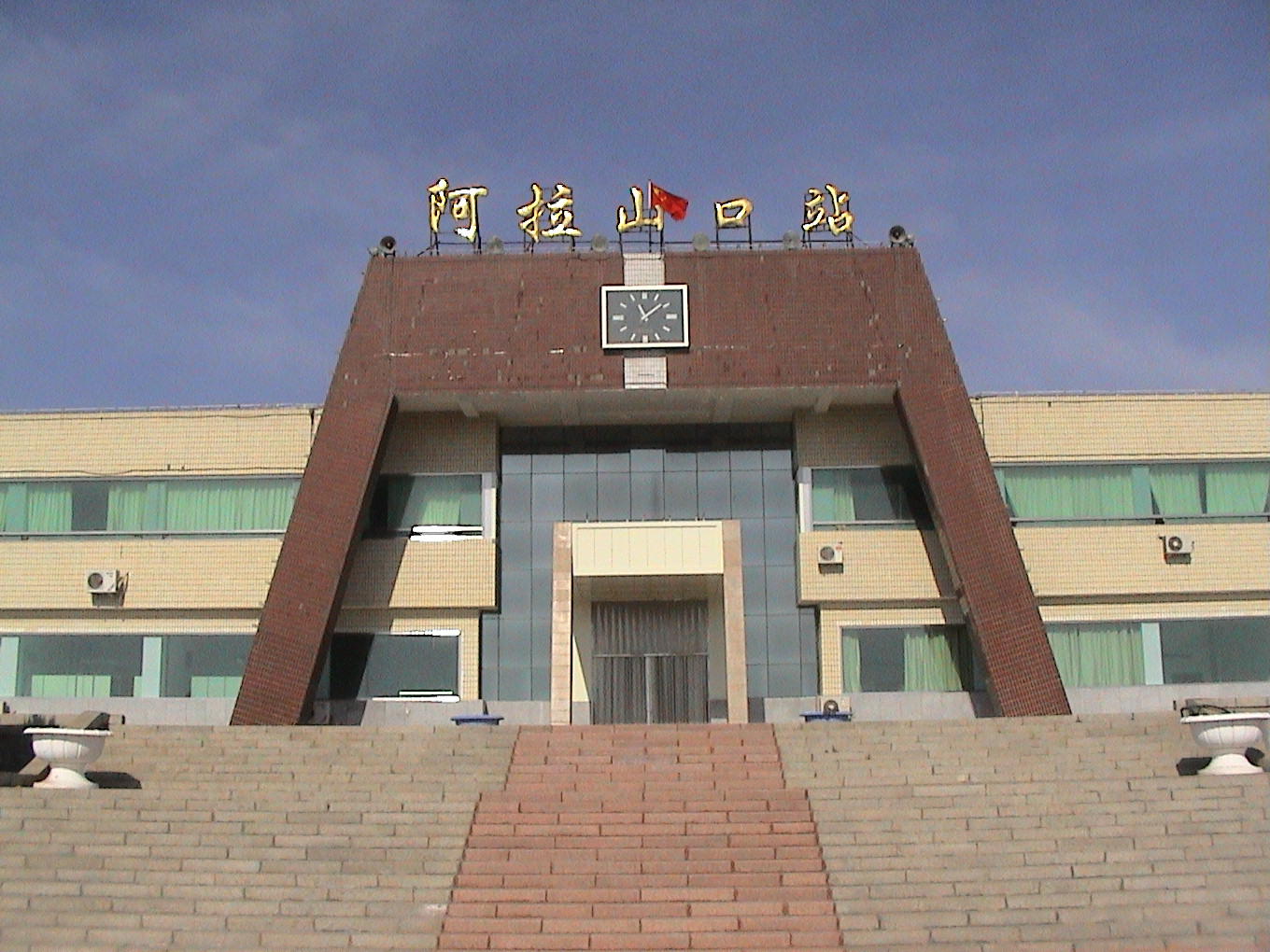
Alashankou station

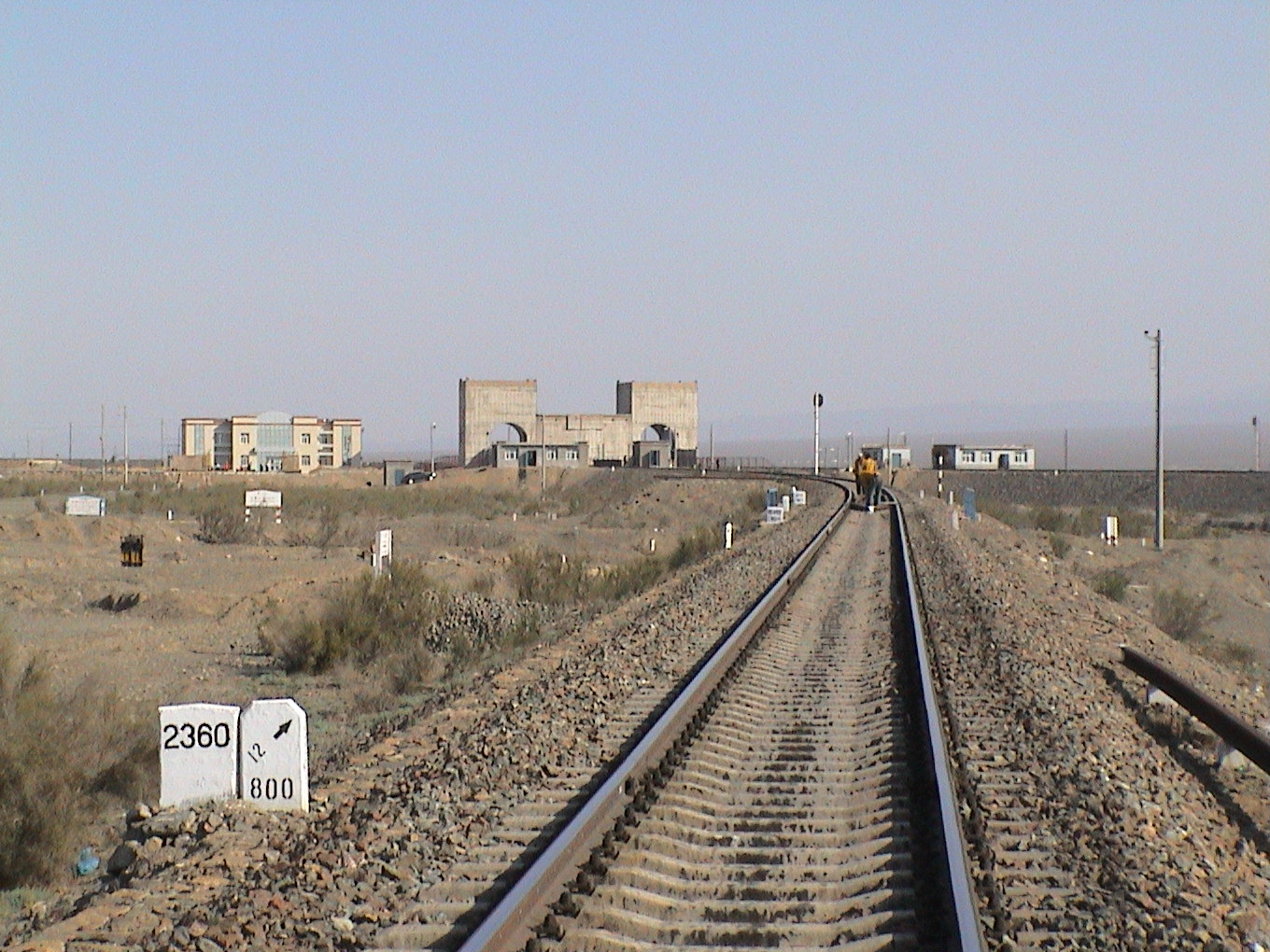
Westernmost point of the Northern Xinjiang railway, with marker showing 2,360 km (1,470 mi) from Lanzhou

== See also ==
- Dzungarian Alatau
- List of railways in China
