= List of National Garden Cities in China =

This is a list of cities granted the title of National Garden City by Ministry of Housing and Urban-Rural Development of the People's Republic of China.

== A ==
- Anning, Yunnan
- Anqing

== B ==
- Baoji
- Baotou
- Beijing

== C ==
- Changchun
- Changji
- Changshu
- Changzhi
- Changzhou
- Chaozhou
- Chengdu

== D ==
- Dalian
- Dengfeng
- Diaobingshan
- Dongguan
- Dujiangyan City

== F ==
- Foshan
- Fuyang
- Fuzhou

== G ==
- Guang'an
- Guangzhou
- Guilin
- Guiyang

== H ==
- Haikou
- Handan
- Hangzhou
- Hefei
- Huaibei
- Huainan
- Huangshan City
- Huangshi
- Huizhou
- Huzhou

== J ==
- Jiangmen
- Jiangyin
- Jiaonan
- Jiaozuo
- Jiaxing
- Jilin City
- Jincheng
- Jingdezhen
- Jiyuan

== K ==
- Kaiping
- Karamay
- Korla
- Kunshan
- Kuytun

== L ==
- Laiwu
- Langfang
- Leshan
- Linhai

== M ==
- Ma'anshan
- Maoming
- Mianyang
- Minhang District

== N ==
- Nanchang
- Nanjing
- Nanning
- Nantong
- Nanyang, Henan
- Ningbo

== P ==
- Pudong
- Puyang

== Q ==
- Qian'an, Hebei
- Qingzhou
- Qinhuangdao
- Quanzhou
- Quzhou

== R ==
- Rizhao
- Rongcheng, Shandong
- Rushan, Shandong

== S ==
- Sanming
- Sanya
- Shanghai
- Shaoxing
- Shenyang
- Shenzhen
- Shihezi
- Shijiazhuang
- Shiyan
- Shouguang
- Siping, Jilin
- Songyuan
- Suzhou

== T ==
- Taicang
- Tangshan
- Tongling
- Tongxiang

== W ==
- Weihai
- Wendeng District
- Wugang, Henan
- Wuhan
- Wujiang District, Suzhou
- Wuxi

== X ==
- Xiamen
- Xiangyang
- Xintai
- Xinxiang
- Xinyu
- Xuchang
- Xuzhou

== Y ==
- Yangzhou
- Yanshi
- Yantai
- Yichang
- Yichun, Heilongjiang
- Yichun, Jiangxi
- Yinchuan
- Yiwu
- Yixing
- Yong'an
- Yueyang

== Z ==
- Zhangjiagang
- Zhangzhou
- Zhanjiang
- Zhaoqing
- Zhengzhou
- Zhenjiang
- Zhongshan
- Zhuhai
- Zhuji
- Zhuzhou
- Zibo
- Zunyi
