= Kuytun–Beitun railway =

Railway line in Xinjiang, China

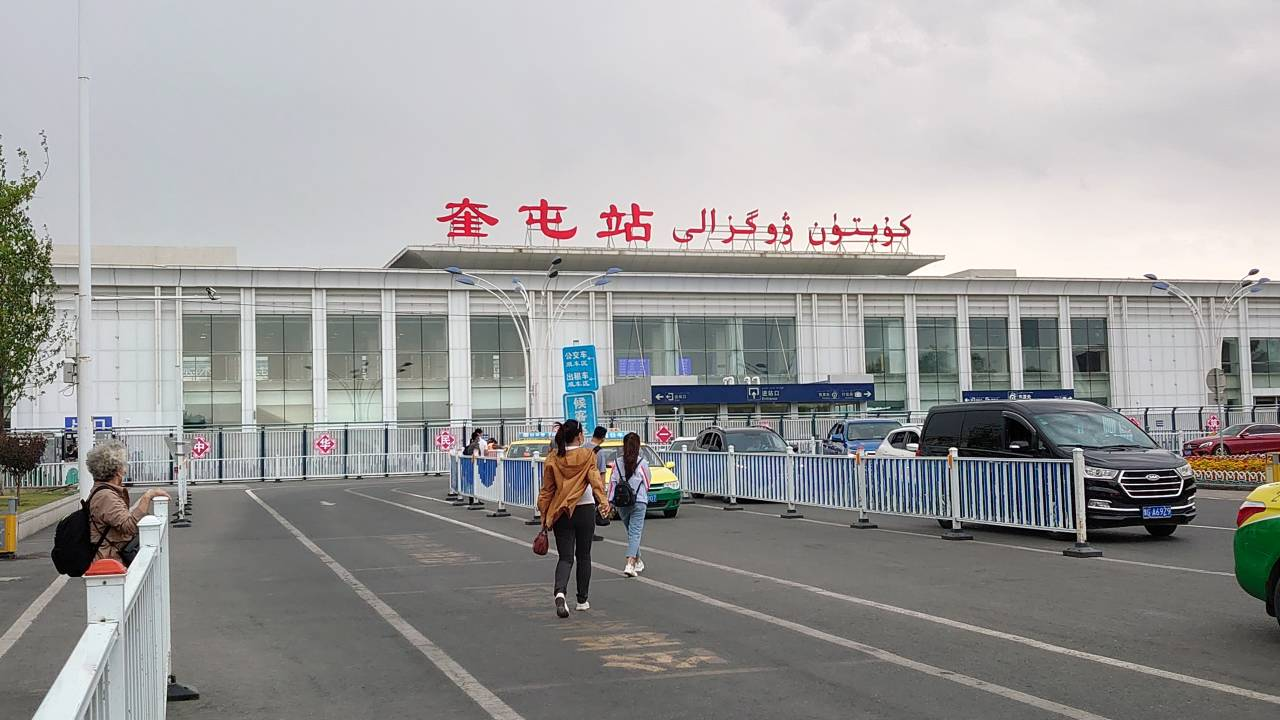
Kuytun Railway Station, 2021

The Kuytun–Beitun railway or Kuibei railway (simplified Chinese: 奎北铁路; traditional Chinese: 奎北鐵路; pinyin: Kuíběi Tiělù) is a single-track railway in Xinjiang, China between Kuytun and Beitun. The railway branches from the Northern Xinjiang railway at Kuytun and heads north across the Junggar Basin to Beitun, near Altay, passing through Karamay, Urho, and Fuhai (Burultoqay). The railway is 468.5 km in length The railway opened to freight traffic on December 29, 2009, and passenger traffic on June 1, 2011.

An extension of this railway toward Altay City opened in 2016. From Altay, the route continues as the Altay–Fuyun–Zhundong railway.

The Karamay–Tacheng railway (under construction as of 2017) branches off the Kuytun–Beitun railway at Baikouquan Station (百口泉站), and runs to Karamay, Emin County and Tacheng.

== See also ==
- List of railways in China
