= 131st Regiment =

131st Regiment may refer to:

- 131st Airborne Engineer Regiment
- 131st Artillery Regiment "Centauro", Italy
- 131st Aviation Regiment, United States
- 131st Cavalry Regiment, United States
- 131st Engineer Battalion "Ticino", Italy
- 131st (Lowland – City of Glasgow) Field Regiment, Royal Artillery
- 131st Light Anti-Aircraft Regiment, Royal Artillery
- 131st Heavy Anti-Aircraft Regiment, Royal Artillery
- 131st Infantry Regiment (United States)
- 131st Regiment (XPCC)
- 131st Regiment of Foot
- 131st Tank Regiment, Italy

== American Civil War regiments ==
- 131st Illinois Infantry Regiment
- 131st New York Infantry Regiment
- 131st Ohio Infantry Regiment
- 131st Pennsylvania Infantry Regiment

== See also ==
- 131st Division (disambiguation)
