= Altay railway station =

Railway station in Altay City

Altay railway station 阿勒泰站
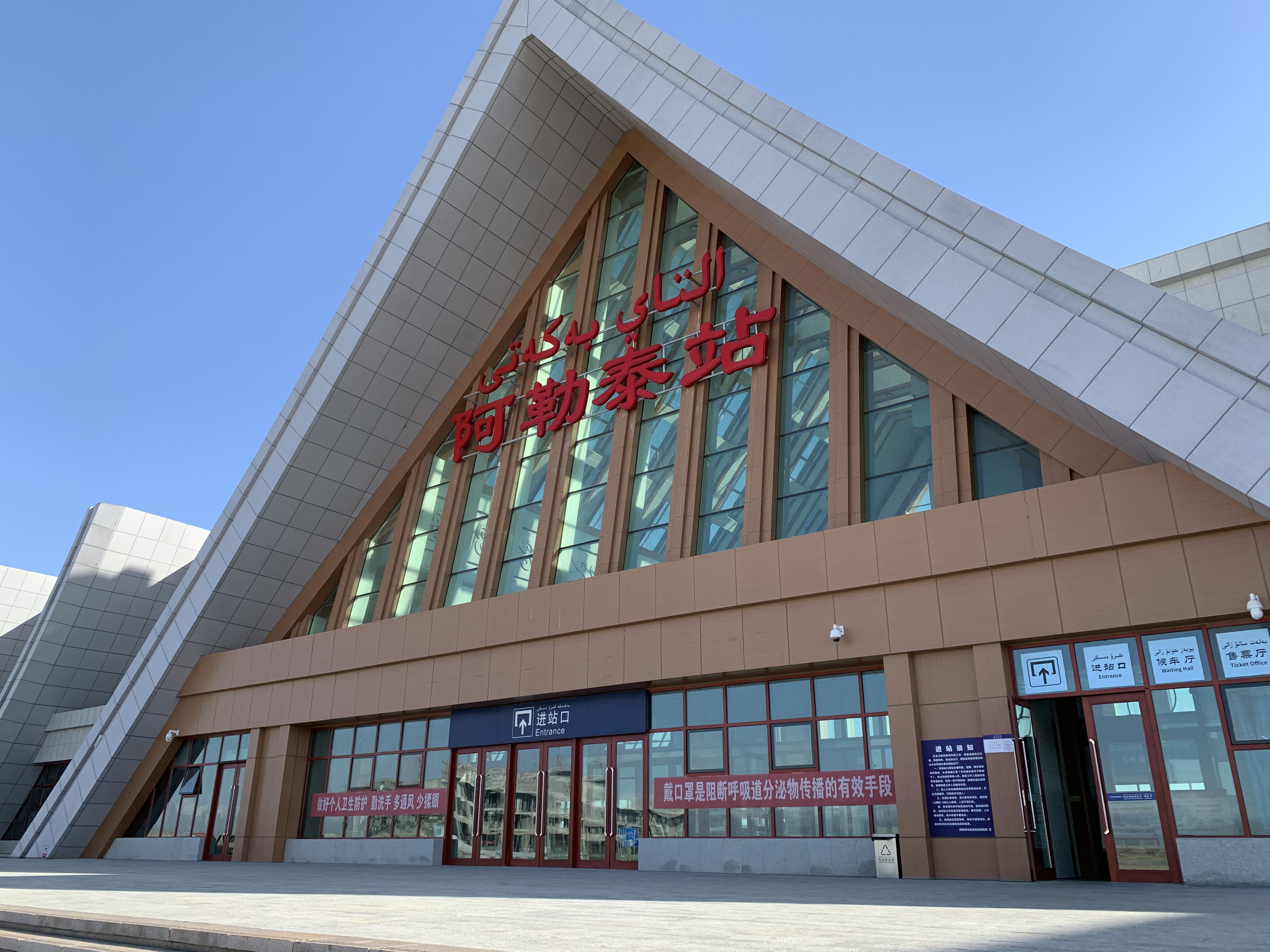
- Station entrance

General information
- Other names: Aletai railway station
- Location: Altay City, Altay Prefecture, Ili Kazakh Autonomous Prefecture, Xinjiang; China
- Coordinates: 47°43′03″N 88°05′14″E
- Operator: China Railway Ürümqi Group
- Lines: Kuytun–Beitun railway; Altay–Fuyun–Zhundong railway
- Platforms: 3
- Tracks: 5

History
- Opened: 10 June 2017

Services
Preceding station	China Railway	Following station
Balibagai towards Kuytun	Kuytun–Beitun railway	Terminus
Terminus	Altay–Fuyun–Zhundong railway	Kamusite towards Zhundong
Location

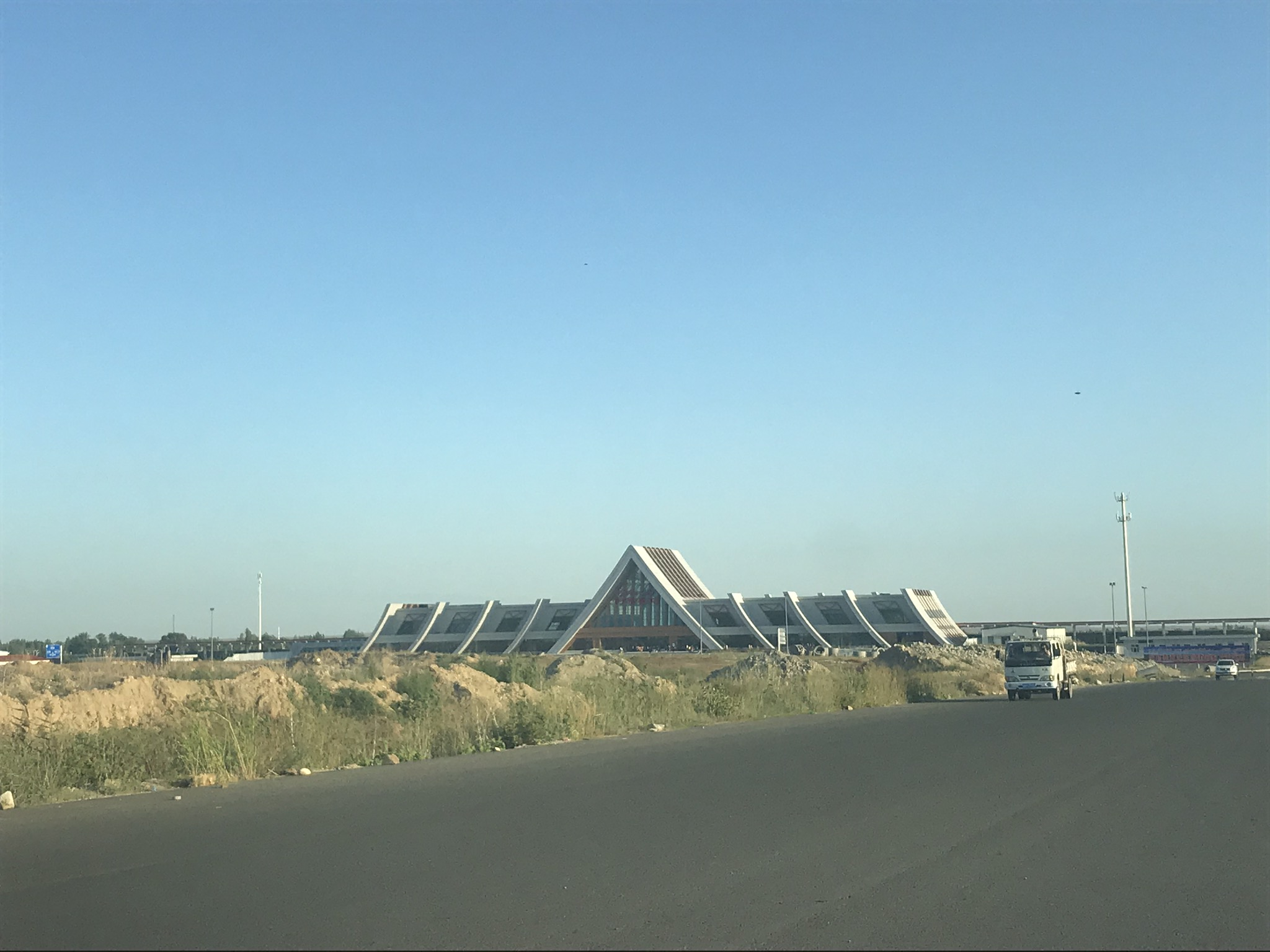
The station from a distance

Altay railway station (Chinese: 阿勒泰站; pinyin: Ālètài Zhàn), also known as Aletai railway station, is a railway station in Altay City, Altay Prefecture, Ili Kazakh Autonomous Prefecture, Xinjiang, China. It was opened as an extension of the Kuytun–Beitun railway on 10 June 2017, ending Altay City's history of no railway services.

== History ==
Construction of Altay railway station started in July 2015, as one of the major infrastructure projects of the Altay Prefecture in the twelfth five-year plan of the PRC. The basic structural construction of the station building was completed in July 2016, and after some furnishing work, the station was opened for operation with the departure of the K9772/9773 train to Aksu City on 10 June 2017. Altay station started providing services to Ürümqi and other places in Xinjiang via the Kuytun–Beitun railway. Services to Fuyun began on 6 December 2020 upon the completion of the Altay–Fuyun section of the Altay–Fuyun–Zhundong railway.

== Significance ==
Altay City is rich in mineral resources, has unique tourism resources, and borders Kazakhstan, Russia and Mongolia. Therefore, Altay railway station is an important transportation hub for the northern passage of the Silk Road Economic Belt. The opening of the railway station shortened the distance between the Altay Prefecture and other places in Xinjiang and is expected to bring more domestic and overseas tourists to visit the attractions in Altay.

== Timetable ==
The station is served by five passenger trains per day. Most services terminate at Fuyun or Ürümqi, but there is one long-haul service, K4016, to Zhengzhou via Lanzhou–Xinjiang railway's Ürümqi and Lanzhou. There were formerly services to Aksu and Kashgar when the station was first opened.

Train route designation	Destination	Departure time (UTC+8)
Y965/Y968	Fuyun	09:15
K9735/K9738	Fuyun	10:10
K4016	Zhengzhou	11:00
K9736/K9737	Ürümqi	21:00
Y966/Y967	Ürümqi	23:02

== See also ==
- Aletai Xuedu Airport
