= 131st Regiment (XPCC) =

The 131st Regiment of Xinjiang Production and Construction Corps (新疆生产建设兵团第131团), also known as the 131th Regiment of the XPCC (兵团131团), together with its reclamation area, commonly known as the 131st Regiment Farm (兵团131团场), is an economic and paramilitary formed unit that is part of the 7th Division (兵团第七师). The Regiment is headquartered at Junggar Road (准噶尔路) in Kuytun City, Xinjiang Uygur Autonomous Region. It is composed of 21 agriculture construction companies. As of 2010 census, its population was 24,154.

The 131th Regiment is located in the territories of Kuytun and Wusu cities. It is bordered by Kuytun River to the west, and to the south by the southwestern edge of Jungger Basin on the northern side of Tianshan. The regiment has plain farming areas and mountain pastures. It has an area of 779.846 square kilometers, of which 644.5767 square kilometers are in Kuytun and 129.2687 square kilometers in Wusu.

== History ==
Based on Henan Zhibian Brigade (河南支边大队) with about a thousand people and some cadres and soldiers transferred from the 7th Division of the XPCC, Quytun Farm (奎屯农场) was incorporated in July 1956. The Quytun Farm was organized into the 131th Regiment, a separate paramilitary organization with serial number by Xinjiang Military District (新疆军区) in 1969.
