= Ürümqi–Dzungaria railway =

Railway line in Xinjiang Uyghur Autonomous Region, China

The Ürümqi-Dzungaria railway or Wuzhun railway (Chinese: 乌准铁路) is a single-track railway line in Xinjiang, China, between Ürümqi, the regional capital of Xinjiang, and the coal fields of the eastern Junggar Basin (Dzungaria). The railway is 264 km (164 mi) in length and runs east from Ürümqi to Wucaiwan (Chinese: 五彩湾, in Jimsar County) to Jiangjunmiao (Chinese: 将军庙), in the northern part of Qitai County. The line opened in 2009 and was built primarily to carry coal.

At its northern end, the line meets the Altay–Fuyun–Zhundong railway.

== Passenger services ==
On 12 July 2019, a passenger service was introduced between Ürümqi railway station, Weijiaquan, and Zhundong.

== See also ==
- List of railways in China
