= Kuytun =

Kuytun 奎屯市 (Chinese) كۈيتۇن شەھىرى (Uyghur) كۇيتىڭ قالاسى (Kazakh)
- County-level city
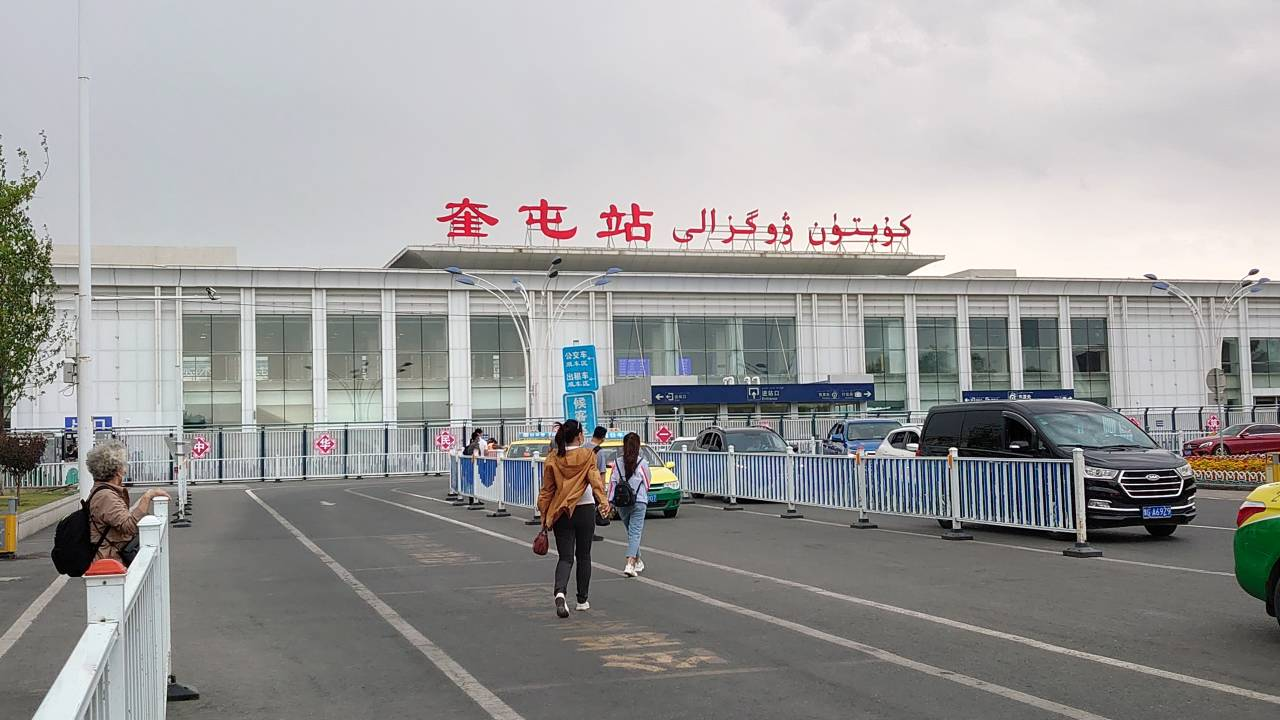
- Kuytun railway station

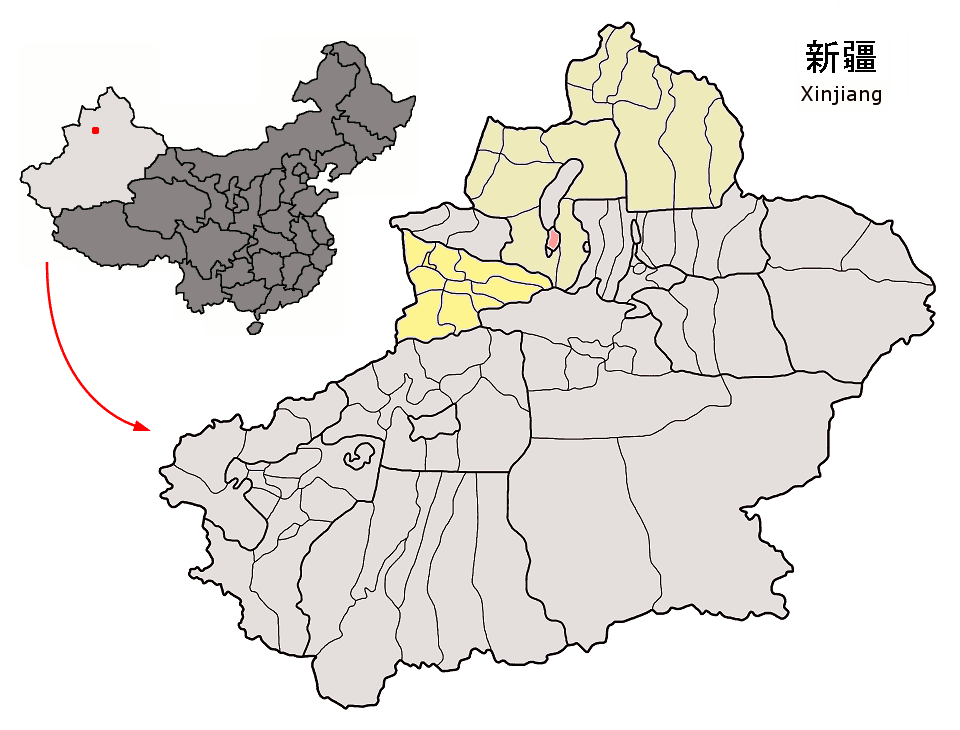
- Location of Kuytun City (red) within Ili Prefecture (yellow) and Xinjiang

- Location in Xinjiang Kuytun (Xinjiang) Kuytun (China)
- Coordinates (Kuytun municipal government): 44°25′35″N 84°54′12″E
- Country: China
- Autonomous region: Xinjiang
- Autonomous prefecture: Ili
- Municipal seat: Tuanjie Road Subdistrict

Area
  - Total: 784.8 km^{2} (303.0 sq mi)

Population (2020)
  - Total: 229,122
  - Density: 291.9/km^{2} (756.1/sq mi)

Demographics
  - Ethnic groups: 94.6% Han Chinese; <5.4% other
- Time zone: UTC+8 (China Standard Time (Note: Locals in Xinjiang frequently observe UTC+6 (Xinjiang Time), 2 hours behind Beijing.))
- Website: www.xjkuitun.gov.cn

Kuytun

Chinese name
- Chinese: 奎屯市
Transcriptions
Standard Mandarin
- Hanyu Pinyin: Kuítún shì

Uyghur name
- Uyghur: كۈيتۇن شەھىرى
Transcriptions
- Latin Yëziqi: Küytun shehiri

Kazakh name
- Kazakh: كۇيتىڭ قالاسى; Қойтүн қаласы

Kuytun (Uyghur: كۈيتۇن) or Kuitun (Chinese: 奎屯) is a county-level city with about 285,000 residents (2000 census) in Ili Kazakh Autonomous Prefecture, Xinjiang, China. Kuitun is located between Wusu and Shihezi on the railway from Ürümqi to Kazakhstan, close to a desert.

Kuytun has historically been associated with the 7th Xinjiang Agriculture Construction Division (兵团第七师), which ran the city until 1975 but still administers its Tianbei New Area.

Local industries include food processing and textile industries, as well as Kuitun Power Plant.

== Name ==
The name Kuytun is from the Mongolian word "хүйтэн" (xüjten), which literally means "cold". The Chinese name Kuiteng (奎騰) first appeared in the official historical book History of Yuan, and referred to the Kuytun River. According to legend, during Genghis Khan's campaign of westward expansion, some of his troops were stationed in the area in wintertime and commented on the cold weather by repeatedly shouting "kuytun!" The area has since been named Kuytun.

== History ==
At the latest in the 3rd century BC (Qin dynasty), the Saka people appeared in the place of present Kuytun area. This was followed by the Great Yuezhi people and then the Usans.

Kuytun was part of Protectorate of the Western Regions (59 BC) in the Han period. During the period of the Jin, Sixteen Kingdoms and Northern and Southern dynasties, it was part of Yueban, then that was followed by the Northern Wei, Rouran and then the First Turkic Khaganate. It was the territory of Tiele tribes in Western Turk in the Sui period and of Kunling Protectorate (崑陵都護府) in the Tang period. It was part of Toquz Oghuz and it was followed by Liao State in the Five Dynasties and Ten Kingdoms period. The place was within the territory of Mongol Qurzh (曲儿只) in the period of Genghis Khan (1206 - 1227), and as part of the Chagatai Khanate between 1306 - 1330. As the pastureland of Oirats, it was under the administration of Kur Qara Usu (庫爾喀喇烏蘇) of Dzungars in the Qing period. When Xinjiang Province was found in 1884, the army camps (军台) and fortress (营塘) in the province were changed into military posts (驿站), Kuytun Post (奎屯驿) was one of that in those days.

The territory was Kuytun Divion (Kuitunzhuang, 奎屯庄), one of nine divisions in Wusu County (乌苏县) in 1913. In 1945, Wusu County was divided into four minggans (administrative Division below the county, 千户长), Kuytun was one of that. The minggan of Kuytun had five centenarii (百户长) of Kuytun (奎屯), Bayingou (巴音沟), Jiujianlou (九间楼), Huanggong (皇宫) and Bashisihu (八十四户) under its administration. The security police station (保安派出所) was found in Kuytun in 1948.

In August 1950, the administrative division of minggan in Wusu County was transformed into a district, and a centenarii into a township. Kuytun was the 1st township of the 2nd district in Wusu County, and it had five unincorporated villages of Huanggou (黄沟), Tashikuitun (塔什奎屯), Kalasu (喀拉苏), Diankuitun (店奎屯) and Kaiganqi (开干其) under its administration.

In the further adjustment of administrative divisions in March 1954, Kuytun became the 1st township of the 1st district of Wusu County. In early 1957, The three townships of Kuytun (奎屯乡), Bashisihu (八十四户乡) and Jiujianlou (九间楼乡) were amalgamated into Xinfu Township (幸福乡). In March 1957, the 7th Division of XPCC (兵团农七师) moved its headquarters to Kuytun from Paotai (炮台).

In July 1958, Kuytun was incorporated to Karamay from Wushi County. On March 25, 1975, the XPCC was withdrawn, the 7th Division with agriculture and animal husbandry farms, and its owned industrial enterprises were devolved to the local administration. On August 29, 1975, the county-level city of Kuytun was approved to establish from Karamay by the State Council, and it was under administration of Ili Autonomous Prefecture. On September 10 of the same year, Kuitun City was officially established and the seat of Ili Autonomous Prefecture was moved to Kuytun from Yining. Based on agriculture and animal husbandry farms, and industrial enterprises owned by the 7th Division of XPCC, Kuytun Bureau of Farms and Land Reclamation (伊犁州奎屯农垦局) was incorporated in July 1978. Kuytun City and the Kuytun Bureau of Farms and Land Reclamation were implemented a team with two brands. The seat of Ili Autonomous Prefecture was moved back to Yining from Kuytun in October 1979.

The XPCC was approved to restore in December 1981. Based on the Kuytun Bureau of Farms and Land Reclamation which was revoked, the 7th Division of XPCC (兵团农七师) was restored in April 1982. The 7th Division of XPCC and local government of Kuytun City are independent of each other, the 7th Division of XPCC is under unified command of XPCC meanwhile Kuytun City is under the administration of Ili Autonomous Prefecture.

== Geography ==
The city of Kuytun is located in the middle northwest of Xinjiang Uygur Autonomous Region, with a north latitude of 44 degrees 19 minutes - 44 degrees 49 minutes and an east longitude of 84 degrees 47 minutes - 85 degrees 18 minutes. It is bordered by Shawan County to the east, by Dushanzi District to the south, by Wusu City to the west and by Karamay District to the north. The maximum length north–south is about 46 kilometers, the maximum is about 33 kilometers between east and west and the total area is 1,171.42 square kilometers.

Kuytun City lies in the northern side of Tianshan, the southwest edge of the Junggar Basin and the Kuytun River valley. Its terrain of the city is tilted from southwest to northeast at an altitude of 450–530 meters. It is the Tianshan fold belt with multi-Gobi gravel in the south, the edge of the platform of Junggar Basin in the north. and there are more water furrows in the west of downtown. The water sources are the Kuytun River and Quangou Reservoir (泉沟水库). The region is in a moderate temperate continental arid climate, hot in summer and cold in winter, rainless. The four seasons are more distinct, the average annual temperature is 7.4 °C and the average annual rainfall of 182 mm.

== Population and ethnic groups ==
As of 2015, the population of Kuytun city was 289,397, accounting for 6.16% of Ili Autonomous Prefecture's population. The population of minorities in the city was 15,768, accounting for 5.45% of Kuytun, and a Han population of 273,629, accounting for 94.55%. The main minorities are Hui, Kazak, Mongols and Uyghur in the city. The Hui population was 6,364, accounting for 2.2%, Kazakhs of 5,222, accounting for 1.8%, Mongols of 1,059, Uyghurs of 1,018 and others of 2,105.

== Administrative divisions ==
Kuytun is divided into five subdistircts and a township.

Name	Simplified Chinese	Hanyu Pinyin	Uyghur (UEY)	Uyghur Latin (ULY)	Administrative division code
Subdistricts
Tuanjie Road Subdistrict	团结路街道	Tuánjiélù Jiēdào	ئىتتىپاق يولى كوچا باشقارمىسى	Ittipaq yoli kocha bashqarmisi	654003001
Ürümqi East Road Subdistrict	乌东路街道	Wūdōnglù Jiēdào			654003002
Beijing Road Subdistrict	北京路街道	Běijīnglù Jiēdào			654003003
Ürümqi West Road Subdistrict	乌鲁木齐西路街道	Wūlǔmùqíxīlù Jiēdào			654003004
Railway Station Subdistrict	火车站街道	Huǒchēzhàn Jiēdào	پويىز ئىستانسىسى كوچا باشقارمىسى	poyiz Istansisi kocha bashqarmisi	654003005
Beijing West Road Subdistrict	北京西路街道	Běijīngxīlù Jiēdào			654003006
Townships
Keygenchi Township	开干齐乡	Kāigànqí Xiāng	كەيگەنچى يېزىسى	keygenchi yëzisi	654003201

- 131th Regiment of the XPCC (兵团一三一团)
- Tianbei New Area (天北新区)

== Transport ==
Kuytun is the largest material transit, distribution and transportation hub in the Northern Xinjiang area, the G30 and G3014 National Expressways, G312 and G217 National Highways meet here. It is a railway junction for the Northern Xinjiang, Second Ürümqi-Jinghe and Kuytun-Beitun Railways.
