= Hutubi County =

Hutubi County 呼图壁县 (Chinese) قۇتۇبى ناھىيىسى (Uyghur) Kutubi
- County
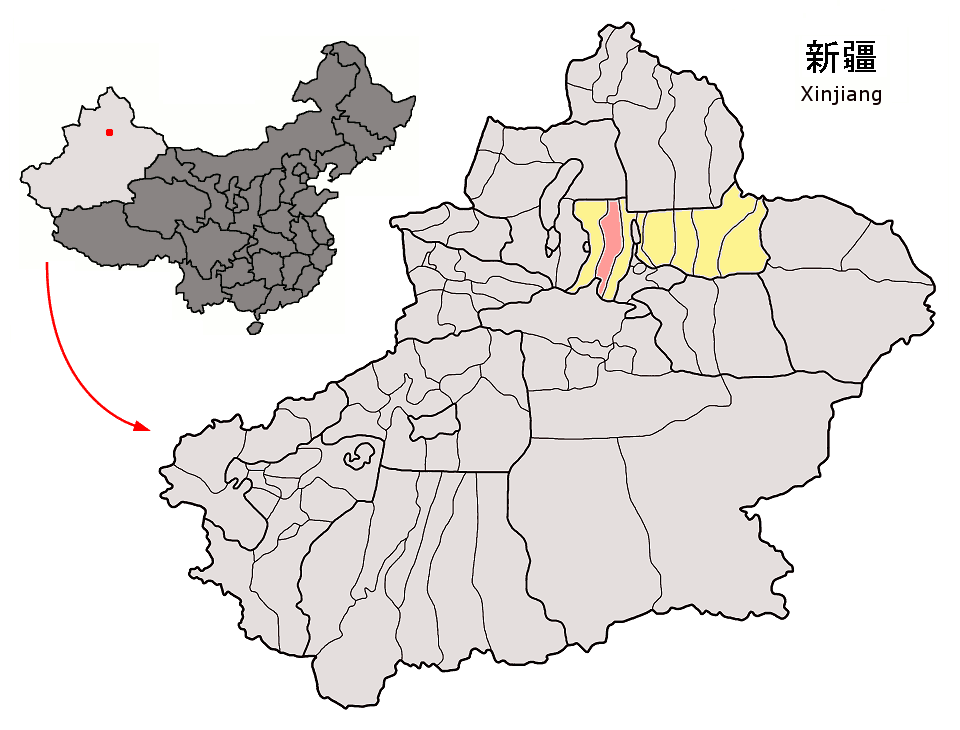
- Location of Hutubi County (pink) in Changji Prefecture (yellow) and Xinjiang (light grey)

- Location within Dzungaria Location within Xinjiang Location within China
- Coordinates: 44°8.627′N 86°56.91284′E
- Country: China
- Autonomous region: Xinjiang
- Autonomous prefecture: Changji
- County seat: Hutubi Town

Area
  - Total: 9,517.53 km^{2} (3,674.74 sq mi)

Population (2020)
  - Total: 192,638
  - Density: 20.2403/km^{2} (52.4222/sq mi)
- Time zone: UTC+8 (China Standard (Note: Locals in Xinjiang frequently observe UTC+6 (Xinjiang Time), 2 hours behind Beijing.))
- Website: www.htb.gov.cn

Hutubi County

Chinese name
- Simplified Chinese: 呼图壁县
- Traditional Chinese: 呼圖壁縣
Transcriptions
Standard Mandarin
- Hanyu Pinyin: Hūtúbì Xiàn
- Wade–Giles: Hu-t'u-pi Hsien
other Mandarin
- Xiao'erjing: خُ‌تُ‌بِ ثِیًا

Alternative Chinese name
- Simplified Chinese: 景化县
- Traditional Chinese: 景化縣
Transcriptions
Standard Mandarin
- Hanyu Pinyin: Jǐnghuà Xiàn

Uyghur name
- Uyghur: قۇتۇبى ناھىيىسى
Transcriptions
- Latin Yëziqi: Qutubi nahiyisi
- Yengi Yeziⱪ: Ⱪutubi naⱨiyisi
- SASM/GNC: Kutubi Nahiyisi
- Siril Yëziqi: Қутубиқ наһийиси

Hutubi County as the official romanized name, also transliterated from Uyghur as Kutubi County, is a county in the Xinjiang Uyghur Autonomous Region and is under the administration of the Changji Hui Autonomous Prefecture. It contains an area of 9,476 km^{2}. According to the 2002 census, it has a population of 210,000.

Hutubi is 61.7 km (38.3 mi) by road north-west of Urumchi, the capital of Xinjiang.

== Subdivisions ==
Hutubi County is made up of 6 towns and 1 ethnic township.

Name	Simplified Chinese	Hanyu Pinyin	Uyghur (UEY)	Uyghur Latin (ULY)	Administrative division code	Notes
Towns
Hutubi Town (Kutubi Town)	呼图壁镇	Hūtúbì Zhèn	قۇتۇبى بازىرى	qutubi baziri	652323100	
Dafeng Town	大丰镇	Dàfēng Zhèn	دافېڭ بازىرى	dafëng baziri	652323101	
Que'ergou Town	雀尔沟镇	Què'ěrgōu Zhèn	چۇرگۇل بازىرى	churgul baziri	652323102	
Ershilidian Town	二十里店镇	Èrshílǐdiàn Zhèn	ئەرشىلىدەن بازىرى	Ershiliden baziri	652323103	
Yuanhucun Town	园户村镇	Yuánhùcūn Zhèn	يۈەنخۇسۇن بازىرى	yüenxusun baziri	652323104	
Wugongtai Town	五工台镇	Wǔgōngtái Zhèn	ۋۇگۇڭتەي بازىرى	wugungtey baziri	652323105	
Ethnic Township
Shitizi Kazakh Ethnic Township	石梯子哈萨克民族乡	Shítīzǐ Hāsàkè Mínzúxiāng	تاشپەلەمپەي قازاق يېزىسى	tashpelempey qazaq yëzisi	652323201	(Kazakh) شىتيزى قازاق اۋىلى

== Climate ==
Climate data for Hutubi, elevation 575 m (1,886 ft), (1991–2020 normals, extremes 1981–2010)
Month	Jan	Feb	Mar	Apr	May	Jun	Jul	Aug	Sep	Oct	Nov	Dec	Year
Record high °C (°F)	10.1 (50.2)	4.9 (40.8)	24.0 (75.2)	35.4 (95.7)	37.5 (99.5)	40.2 (104.4)	40.7 (105.3)	40.2 (104.4)	37.7 (99.9)	32.0 (89.6)	18.6 (65.5)	9.0 (48.2)	40.7 (105.3)
Mean daily maximum °C (°F)	−10.5 (13.1)	−5.9 (21.4)	5.9 (42.6)	20.1 (68.2)	26.5 (79.7)	31.3 (88.3)	32.6 (90.7)	31.3 (88.3)	25.5 (77.9)	16.0 (60.8)	3.5 (38.3)	−7.4 (18.7)	14.1 (57.3)
Daily mean °C (°F)	−16.3 (2.7)	−11.4 (11.5)	0.6 (33.1)	13.0 (55.4)	19.5 (67.1)	24.7 (76.5)	25.9 (78.6)	24.1 (75.4)	18.0 (64.4)	9.1 (48.4)	−1.3 (29.7)	−12.2 (10.0)	7.8 (46.1)
Mean daily minimum °C (°F)	−21.3 (−6.3)	−16.6 (2.1)	−4.2 (24.4)	6.6 (43.9)	12.9 (55.2)	18.1 (64.6)	19.6 (67.3)	17.6 (63.7)	11.3 (52.3)	3.5 (38.3)	−5.4 (22.3)	−16.4 (2.5)	2.1 (35.9)
Record low °C (°F)	−35.2 (−31.4)	−35.8 (−32.4)	−31.7 (−25.1)	−9.2 (15.4)	−1.7 (28.9)	7.0 (44.6)	10.0 (50.0)	5.0 (41.0)	−2.8 (27.0)	−9.1 (15.6)	−30.9 (−23.6)	−36.7 (−34.1)	−36.7 (−34.1)
Average precipitation mm (inches)	7.6 (0.30)	8.4 (0.33)	11.9 (0.47)	23.3 (0.92)	25.4 (1.00)	19.5 (0.77)	23.1 (0.91)	19.3 (0.76)	12.5 (0.49)	14.1 (0.56)	15.7 (0.62)	12.7 (0.50)	193.5 (7.63)
Average precipitation days (≥ 0.1 mm)	7.0	5.4	4.5	5.8	7.1	6.7	6.7	6.1	3.9	4.8	5.9	7.1	71
Average snowy days	13.8	11.9	5.4	1.6	0	0	0	0	0	1.1	6.9	14.2	54.9
Average relative humidity (%)	82	81	72	48	41	40	45	46	47	59	77	84	60
Mean monthly sunshine hours	134.5	153.7	227.9	272.8	315.7	314.3	320.9	312.9	280.1	239.6	150.8	110.7	2,833.9
Percentage possible sunshine	46	51	61	67	69	68	69	74	76	72	53	40	62
Source: China Meteorological Administration

== Transport ==
Hutubi is served by China National Highway 312, the Northern Xinjiang and the Second Ürümqi–Jinghe Railways.

== Petroglyphs ==
Petroglyphs were recorded in Qutubi County at Kangjiashimenzi (Chinese: 康家石门子; pinyin: Kāngjiāshíménzi) and are interpreted as representing male fertility worship. This is because in the two depictions of copulation, the males have faces on their chests, suggesting that the petroglyph's creators believed that males were the source of children. The alleged superiority of the petroglyph's male subjects was the basis for the researcher's conclusion that they were created after 1500 BCE, when it is believed that matriarchal societies were replaced by patriarchies.
