= Karamay–Tacheng railway =

Railway line in China

The Karamay–Tacheng railway (Chinese: 克塔铁路; pinyin: Kè-Tǎ tiělù) is a branch railway in China's Xinjiang Uighur Autonomous Region. The 270 km long line starts at Baikouquan Station (百口泉站) on the Kuytun–Beitun railway in Karamay City, and runs to the northwest, passing through the northeastern part of Toli County and Emin County, and terminating in Tacheng City, near the border with Kazakhstan. The line opened on 30 May 2019. According to Chinanews, 3 daily train services will be available, and a train trip to Ürümqi will take 9–10 hours at as little as 90 RMB.

== See also ==
- List of railways in China
