= Changji =

Changji: 昌吉市 (Chinese); سانجى شەھىرى (Uyghur); چاندجي قالاسى (Kazakh); Changki
- County-level city
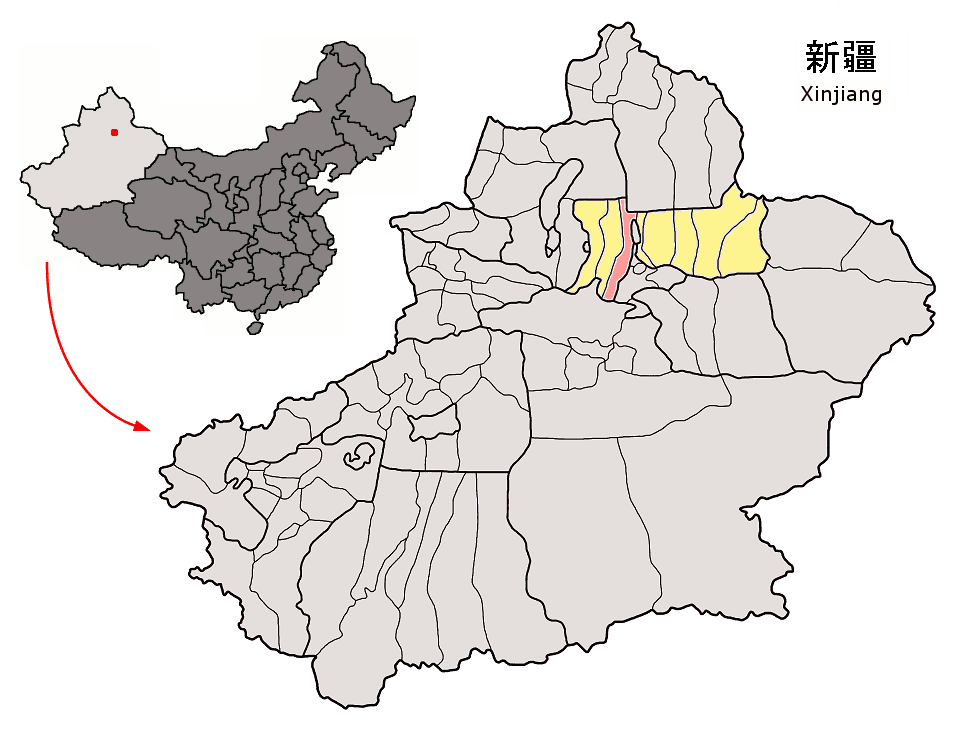
- Location of Changji City (pink) in Changji Prefecture (yellow) and Xinjiang

- Location of the city centre in Xinjiang Changji (China)
- Coordinates (Changji municipal government): 44°00′52″N 87°16′03″E
- Country: China
- Autonomous region: Xinjiang
- Autonomous prefecture: Changji
- Municipal seat: Yan'an North Road Subdistrict

Area
  - Total: 7,981 km^{2} (3,081 sq mi)

Population (2020)
  - Total: 607,441
  - Density: 76.11/km^{2} (197.1/sq mi)
- Time zone: UTC+8 (China Standard (Note: Locals in Xinjiang frequently observe UTC+6 (Xinjiang Time), 2 hours behind Beijing.))
- Website: www.cjs.gov.cn

Changji

Chinese name
- Chinese: 昌吉
Transcriptions
Standard Mandarin
- Hanyu Pinyin: Chāngjí
other Mandarin
- Xiao'erjing: چَانْ‌ݣِ

Uyghur name
- Uyghur: سانجى
Transcriptions
- Latin Yëziqi: Sanji
- Yengi Yeziⱪ: Sanji
- SASM/GNC: Sanji
- Siril Yëziqi: Санҗи

Kazakh name
- Kazakh: چاندجي قالاسى; Чанджи қаласы

Changji (Chinese: 昌吉) is a county-level city situated about 40 km (25 mi) west of the regional capital, Ürümqi in Northern Xinjiang, China. It is the seat of Changji Hui Autonomous Prefecture. At the northeast corner of the modern city are the walls and other archaeological remains of the Tang dynasty city, usually referred to as Ancient Changji.

A Federation of Industry and Commerce is at Changji. In the area around Changji crop growing, animal husbandry and oil crop growing are important parts of the economy. Changji is the home of Changji University.

== Climate ==
Climate data for Changji, elevation 516 m (1,693 ft), (1991–2020 normals, extremes 1981–2010)
Month	Jan	Feb	Mar	Apr	May	Jun	Jul	Aug	Sep	Oct	Nov	Dec	Year
Record high °C (°F)	7.7 (45.9)	7.1 (44.8)	24.1 (75.4)	35.4 (95.7)	37.9 (100.2)	39.8 (103.6)	43.5 (110.3)	41.1 (106.0)	38.9 (102.0)	32.4 (90.3)	21.7 (71.1)	11.1 (52.0)	43.5 (110.3)
Mean daily maximum °C (°F)	−10.2 (13.6)	−5.6 (21.9)	6.3 (43.3)	20.4 (68.7)	26.6 (79.9)	31.4 (88.5)	32.9 (91.2)	31.7 (89.1)	25.8 (78.4)	16.4 (61.5)	3.8 (38.8)	−7.1 (19.2)	14.4 (57.8)
Daily mean °C (°F)	−15.1 (4.8)	−10.6 (12.9)	0.9 (33.6)	13.1 (55.6)	19.3 (66.7)	24.3 (75.7)	25.7 (78.3)	24.0 (75.2)	17.8 (64.0)	9.1 (48.4)	−1.0 (30.2)	−11.3 (11.7)	8.0 (46.4)
Mean daily minimum °C (°F)	−19.1 (−2.4)	−14.9 (5.2)	−3.8 (25.2)	6.7 (44.1)	12.5 (54.5)	17.6 (63.7)	19.2 (66.6)	17.2 (63.0)	11.0 (51.8)	3.5 (38.3)	−4.7 (23.5)	−14.8 (5.4)	2.5 (36.6)
Record low °C (°F)	−38.5 (−37.3)	−34.3 (−29.7)	−29.5 (−21.1)	−7.6 (18.3)	−1.3 (29.7)	6.5 (43.7)	11.0 (51.8)	7.2 (45.0)	−1.0 (30.2)	−7.4 (18.7)	−30.2 (−22.4)	−36.5 (−33.7)	−38.5 (−37.3)
Average precipitation mm (inches)	7.8 (0.31)	8.5 (0.33)	11.4 (0.45)	22.0 (0.87)	25.8 (1.02)	19.3 (0.76)	22.9 (0.90)	21.2 (0.83)	12.6 (0.50)	14.6 (0.57)	14.8 (0.58)	13.1 (0.52)	194 (7.64)
Average precipitation days (≥ 0.1 mm)	8.4	6.5	4.4	5.9	6.5	6.8	7.4	6.2	4.0	4.9	5.9	9.3	76.2
Average snowy days	15.7	12.8	5.6	1.5	0	0	0	0	0	1	7.2	15.2	59
Average relative humidity (%)	81	79	70	48	44	44	49	49	51	62	77	82	61
Mean monthly sunshine hours	114.9	143.0	221.4	267.0	309.0	309.2	313.4	302.6	276.1	239.3	144.4	94.8	2,735.1
Percentage possible sunshine	39	47	59	65	67	67	68	71	75	72	51	35	60
Source: China Meteorological Administration

== Subdivisions ==
Changji is made up of 6 subdistricts, 8 towns, 1 township, and 1 ethnic township.

Name	Simplified Chinese	Hanyu Pinyin	Uyghur (UEY)	Uyghur Latin (ULY)	Administrative division code	Notes
Subdistricts
Ningbian Road Subdistrict	宁边路街道	Níngbiānlù Jiēdào	نىڭبىيەن يولى كوچا باشقارمىسى	ningbiyen yoli kocha bashqarmisi	652301001	
Yan'an North Road Subdistrict	延安北路街道	Yán'ānběilù Jiēdào	يەنئەن شىمالىي يولى كوچا باشقارمىسى	yen'en shimaliy yoli kocha bashqarmisi	652301002	
Beijing South Road Subdistrict	北京南路街道	Běijīngnánlù Jiēdào	جەنۇبىي بېيجىڭ يولى كوچا باشقارمىسى	jenubiy bëyjing yoli kocha bashqarmisi	652301003	
Jianguo Road Subdistrict	建国路街道	Jiànguólù Jiēdào	دۆلەت قۇرۇش يولى كوچا باشقارمىسى	dölet qurush yoli kocha bashqarmisi	652301004	
Zhongshan Road Subdistrict	中山路街道	Zhōngshānlù Jiēdào	جۇڭشەن يولى كوچا باشقارمىسى	jungshen yoli kocha bashqarmisi	652301005	
Lüzhou Road Subdistrict (Bostan Road Subdistrict)	绿洲路街道	Lǜzhōulù Jiēdào	بوستان يولى كوچا باشقارمىسى	bostan yoli kocha bashqarmisi	652301006	
Towns
Liuhuanggou Town	硫磺沟镇	Liúhuánggōu Zhèn	ليۇخۇاڭگۇ بازىرى	lyuxuanggu baziri	652301100	
Sangong Town	三工镇	Sāngōng Zhèn	سەنگۇڭ بازىرى	sengung baziri	652301101	
Yushugou Town	榆树沟镇	Yúshùgōu Zhèn	يۈشۇگۇ بازىرى	yüshugu baziri	652301102	
Erliugong Town	二六工镇	Èrliùgōng Zhèn	ئەرليۇگۇڭ بازىرى	Erlyugung baziri	652301103	
Daxiqu Town	大西渠镇	Dàxīqú Zhèn	داشىچۈ بازىرى	dashichü baziri	652301104	
Liugong Town	六工镇	Liùgōng Zhèn	ليۇگۇڭ بازىرى	lyugung baziri	652301105	
Binhu Town	滨湖镇	Bīnhú Zhèn	بىڭخۇ بازىرى	bingxu baziri	652301106	
Dianba Town	佃坝镇	Diànbà Zhèn	ديەنبا بازىرى	dyenba baziri	652301107	
Township
Miaoergou Township	庙尔沟乡	Miào'ěrgōu Xiāng	مىئەرگۇ يېزىسى	mi'ergu yëzisi	652301203	
Ethnic Township
Axili Kazakh Ethnic Township	阿什里哈萨克民族乡	Āshílǐ Hāsàkè Mínzúxiāng	ئاشىلى قازاق يېزىسى	Ashili qazaq yëzisi	652301202	(Kazakh) اشىلى قازاق ۇلتتىق اۋىلى

== Transport ==
Changji is served by China National Highway 312, the Northern Xinjiang and the Second Ürümqi-Jinghe Railways.
