= Altay–Fuyun–Zhundong railway =

Railway line in china

Overview
- Status: Operational
- Termini: Altay; Zhundong

Service
- Type: Heavy rail

History
- Opened: 30 December 2019 (Fuyun to Zhundong North); 6 December 2020 (Altay to Fuyun)

Technical
- Line length: 419 km (260 mi)
- Track gauge: 1,435 mm (4 ft 8 1/2 in) standard gauge
- Electrification: 25 kV 50 Hz AC overhead catenary
- Operating speed: 120 km/h (75 mph)

The Altay–Fuyun–Zhundong railway is a single-track passenger and freight railway in China.

At Zhundong, the line meets the Ürümqi–Dzungaria railway. At Altay, it meets the Kuytun–Beitun railway.

== History ==
Construction of the railway began in August 2016. The section from Fuyun to Zhundong North opened on 30 December 2019. The remaining 148 kilometres (92 mi) section from Altay to Fuyun opened on 6 December 2020.
