= Wusu =

Wusu 乌苏市 (Chinese) شىخۇ شەھىرى (Uyghur) شيحۋ قالاسى (Kazakh) Usu
- County-level city
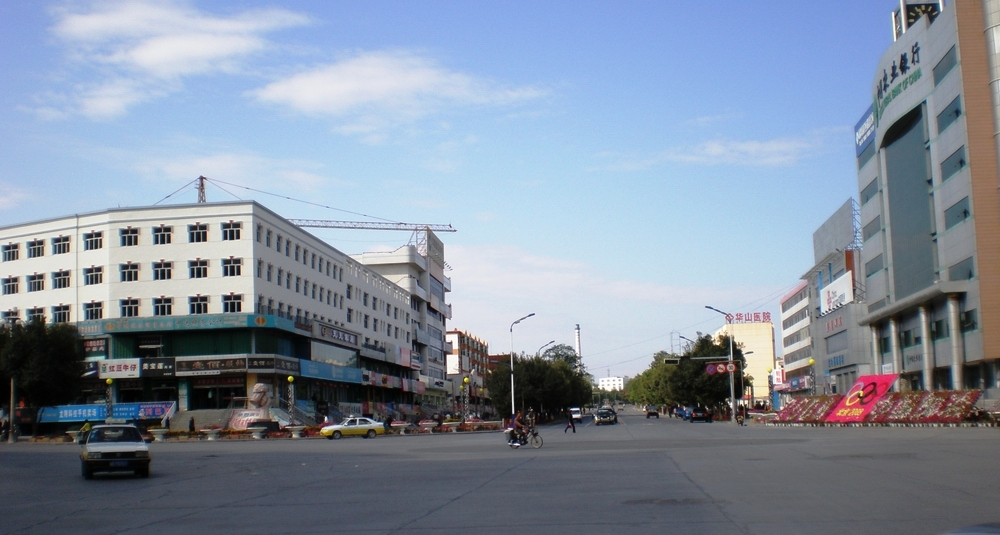
- Downtown Wusu

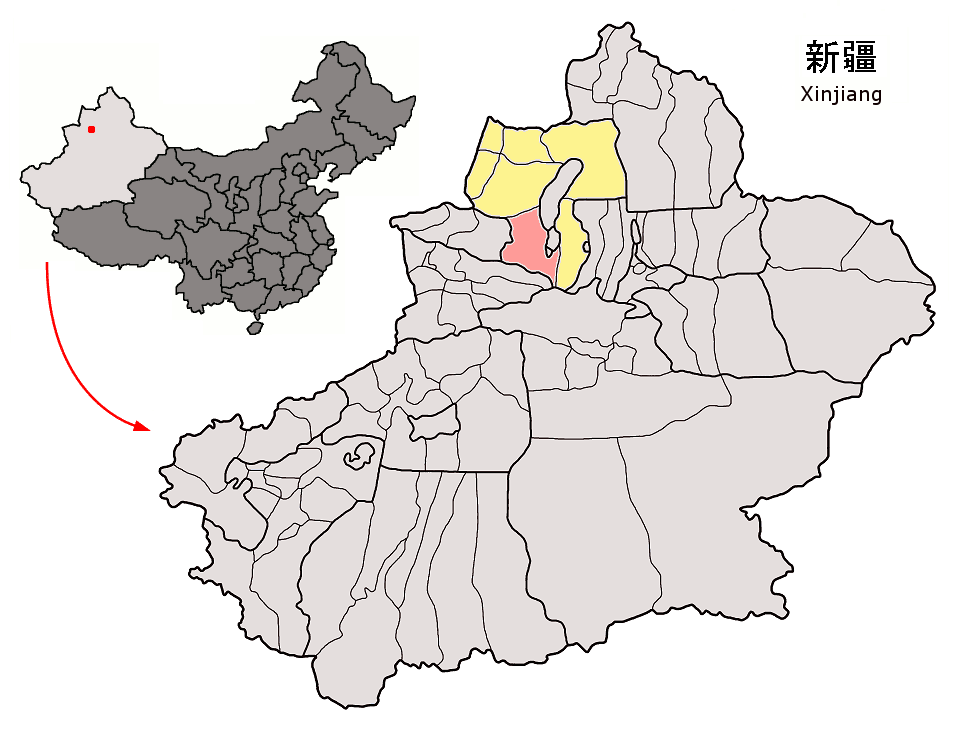
- Location of Wusu County (red) within Tacheng Prefecture (yellow) and Xinjiang

- Location in Xinjiang Wusu (Xinjiang) Wusu (China)
- Coordinates: 44°25′08″N 84°42′50″E
- Country: China
- Autonomous region: Xinjiang
- Prefecture: Tacheng
- Municipal seat: Xinshiqu Subdistrict

Area
  - Total: 14,394.12 km^{2} (5,557.60 sq mi)

Population (2020)
  - Total: 262,906
  - Density: 18.2648/km^{2} (47.3057/sq mi)
- Time zone: UTC+8 (China Standard (Note: Locals in Xinjiang frequently observe UTC+6 (Xinjiang Time), 2 hours behind Beijing.))
- Website: www.xjws.gov.cn

Wusu

Chinese name
- Simplified Chinese: 乌苏市
- Traditional Chinese: 烏蘇市
Transcriptions
Standard Mandarin
- Hanyu Pinyin: Wūsū shì

Mongolian name
- Mongolian Cyrillic: Ус хот
- Mongolian script: ᠤᠰᠤ ᠬᠣᠲᠠ

Uyghur name
- Uyghur: شىخۇ شەھىرى
Transcriptions
- Latin Yëziqi: Shixu shehiri

Kazakh name
- Kazakh: شيحۋ قالاسى; Şihu qalasy Шиху қаласы

Wusu, (Note: Chinese: 乌苏; pinyin: Wūsū) officially Usu, (Note: The official romanized name, transliterated from Mongolian: ᠤᠰᠤ) is a county-level city with more than 100,000 residents in Xinjiang, China. It is a part of Tacheng Prefecture of Ili Kazakh Autonomous Prefecture. Oil production is a major part of the economy while the county is an oasis in the Dzungarian Basin. Wusu lies between the major cities of Bole and Shihezi in Northern Xinjiang and west of Ürümqi, capital of Xinjiang and Kuitun, south of Karamay.

== Transport ==
Wusu is served by China National Highway 312, the Northern Xinjiang and the Second Ürümqi-Jinghe Railways.

== Administrative divisions ==
Wusu is divided into 5 subdistricts, 10 towns, 5 townships, and 2 ethnic townships.

Name	Simplified Chinese	Hanyu Pinyin	Uyghur (UEY)	Uyghur Latin (ULY)	Kazakh (Arabic script)	Kazakh (Cyrillic script)	Notes	Administrative division code
Subdistricts
Nanyuan Subdistrict	南苑街道	Nányuàn Jiēdào	جەنۇبى باغچا كوچا باشقارمىسى	jenubi baghcha kocha bashqarmisi	وڭتۇستىك باقشا ءمالى باسقارماسى	Оңтүстік Бақша мәлі басқармасы		654202001
Hongqiao Subdistrict	虹桥街道	Hóngqiáo Jiēdào	قىزىل كۆۋرۈك كوچا باشقارمىسى	qizil köwrük kocha bashqarmisi	قىزىل كوپىر ءمالى باسقارماسى	Қызыл Көпір мәлі басқармасы		654202002
Xinshiqu Subdistrict	新市区街道	Xīnshìqū Jiēdào	يېڭىشەھەر رايونى كوچا باشقارمىسى	yëngisheher rayoni kocha bashqarmisi	جاڭا قالا ايماعى ءمالى باسقارماسى	Жаңа Қала аумағы мәлі басқармасы		654202003
Xicheng Subdistrict	西城街道	Xīchéng Jiēdào	غەربىي شەھەر كوچا باشقارمىسى	gherbiy sheher kocha bashqarmisi	باتىس قالا ءمالى باسقارماسى	Батыс Қала мәлі басқармасы		654202006
Kuihe Subdistrict	奎河街道	Kuíhé Jiēdào	كۈيتۇن دەرياسى كوچا باشقارمىسى	küytun deryasi kocha bashqarmisi	كۇيتۇن وزەنى ءمالى باسقارماسى	Қойтүн өзені мәлі басқармасы		654202007
Towns
Baiyanggou Town	白杨沟镇	Báiyánggōu Zhèn	بەيياڭگۇ بازىرى (ئاق تېرەك سەي)	beyyanggu baziri	اق تەرەك ساي قالاشىعى	Ақ Терек Сай қалашығы		654202100
Hatubuh Town	哈图布呼镇	Hātúbùhū Zhèn	خاتۇبۇخ بازىرى	xatubux baziri	حاتۋبۇحى قالاشىعى	Хатубухы қалашығы		654202101
Huanggong Town	皇宫镇	Huánggōng Zhèn	خۇاڭگۇڭ بازىرى	xuanggung baziri	حۇاڭگۇڭ قالاشىعى	Хұаңгуң қалашығы		654202102
Chepaizi Town	车排子镇	Chēpǎizǐ Zhèn	چېپەيزە بازىرى	chëpeyze baziri	شەپەيزى قالاشىعى	Шепейзі қалашығы		654202103
Ganhezi Town	甘河子镇	Gānhézǐ Zhèn	گەنخوزا بازىرى	genxoza baziri	گانحىزى قالاشىعى	Гәнхізі қалашығы		654202104
Baiquan Town	百泉镇	Bǎiquán Zhèn	يۈزبۇلاق (بەيچۇەن) بازىرى	yüzbulaq (beychuen) baziri	جۇزبۇلاق قالاشىعى	Жүзбұлақ қалашығы		654202105
Qigixor Town	四棵树镇	Sìkēshù Zhèn	چىگىشور بازىرى	chigishor baziri	شىگىشور قالاشىعى	Шігішөр қалашығы		654202106
Gurtu Town	古尔图镇	Gǔ'ěrtú Zhèn	گۇرتۇ بازىرى	gurtu baziri	گۇرتى (تالدى) قالاشىعى	Гүрті (Талды) қалашығы		654202107
Xihu Town	西湖镇	Xīhú Zhèn	شىخۇ بازىرى	shixu baziri	شيحۋ قالاشىعى	Шиху қалашығы		654202108
Xidagou Town	西大沟镇	Xīdàgōu Zhèn	شىداگۇ بازىرى	shidagu baziri	شيداگۋ قالاشىعى	Шидагу қалашығы		654202109
Townships
Bashisihu Township	八十四户乡	Bāshísìhù Xiāng	باشىسىخۇ يېزىسى	bashisixu yëzisi	باسحۋ اۋىلى	Басху ауылы		654202200
Jiahezi Township	夹河子乡	Jiāhézǐ Xiāng	جاخوزا يېزىسى	jaxoza yëzisi	جياحىزى اۋىلى	Жяхызы ауылы		654202201
Jiujianlou Township	九间楼乡	Jiǔjiānlóu Xiāng	جۇجەنلۇ يېزىسى	jujenlu yëzisi	جيۋجاندىر اۋىلى	Жюжандыр ауылы		654202202
Shiqiao Township	石桥乡	Shíqiáo Xiāng	شىچاۋ يېزىسى	shichaw yëzisi	شىچياۋ اۋىلى	Шычяу ауылы		654202203
Toutai Township	头台乡	Tóutái Xiāng	توتەي يېزىسى	totey yëzisi	دۋتاي اۋىلى	Дутай ауылы		654202204
Ethnic townships
Jirgilti Golin Mongol Ethnic Township	吉尔格勒特郭愣蒙古民族乡	Jí'ěrgélètèguōlèng Ménggǔ Mínzúxiāng	چىرگىلتى گولىن موڭغۇل يېزىسى	chirgilti golin mongghul yëzisi	جىرعىلتىگوليىن موڭعۇل ۇلتتىق اۋىلى	Жырғылты голын Моңғұл Ұлттық ауылы	(Mongolian) ᠵᠢᠷᠭᠢᠶᠠᠯᠲᠤ ᠭᠣᠣᠯ ᠤᠨ ᠮᠣᠩᠭᠣᠯ ᠦᠨᠳᠦᠰᠦᠲᠡᠨ ᠦ ᠰᠢᠶᠠᠩ; Жаргиолд Голын монгол үндэстэний шиян	654202205
Tablihat Mongol Ethnic Township	塔布勒合特蒙古民族乡	Tǎbùlèhétè Ménggǔ Mínzúxiāng	تابىلخات موڭغۇل يېزىسى	tabilxat mongghul yëzisi	تابىلعات موڭعۇل ۇلتتىق اۋىلى	Табылғат Моңғұл Ұлттық ауылы	(Mongolian) ᠲᠠᠪᠢᠯᠬᠠᠲᠤ ᠮᠣᠩᠭᠣᠯ ᠦᠨᠳᠦᠰᠦᠲᠡᠨ ᠦ ᠰᠢᠶᠠᠩ; Тавилхат монгол үндэстэний шиян	654202206

Others

- Ganjia Lake Ranch (甘家湖牧场) (گەنجاخۇ چارۋىچىلىق مەيدانى) (گانجياحۋ مال شارۋاشىلىعى الاڭىنداعى)
- Bayingou Ranch (巴音沟牧场) (بايانغول چارۋىچىلىق مەيدانى) (بايانعۋ مال شارۋاشىلىعى الاڭىنداعى)
- Saileketi Ranch (赛力克提牧场) (سەلكىت چارۋىچىلىق مەيدانى) (سالىكتى مال شارۋاشىلىعى الاڭىنداعى)
- Wusu Prison (乌苏监狱) (شىخۇ تۈرمىسى) (شيحۋ تۇرمەسى)
- Ganjia Lake Forest Area (甘家湖林场) (گەنجاخۇ ئورمانچىلىق مەيدانى) (گانجياحۋ ورمان مايدانى)
- XPCC 123rd Regiment (兵团一二三团) (123-تۇەن مەيدانى) (123-تۋان الاڭىنداعى)
- XPCC 124th Regiment (兵团一二四团) (124-تۇەن مەيدانى) (124-تۋان الاڭىنداعى)
- XPCC 125th Regiment (兵团一二五团) (125-تۇەن مەيدانى) (125-تۋان الاڭىنداعى)
- XPCC 126th Regiment (兵团一二六团) (126-تۇەن مەيدانى) (126-تۋان الاڭىنداعى)
- XPCC 127th Regiment (兵团一二七团) (127-تۇەن مەيدانى) (127-تۋان الاڭىنداعى)
- XPCC 128th Regiment (兵团一二八团) (128-تۇەن مەيدانى) (128-تۋان الاڭىنداعى)
- XPCC 130th Regiment (兵团一三〇团) (130-تۇەن مەيدانى) (130-تۋان الاڭىنداعى)

== Climate ==
Climate data for Usu, elevation 479 m (1,572 ft), (1991–2020 normals, extremes 1991–present)
Month	Jan	Feb	Mar	Apr	May	Jun	Jul	Aug	Sep	Oct	Nov	Dec	Year
Record high °C (°F)	4.2 (39.6)	7.4 (45.3)	26.6 (79.9)	36.2 (97.2)	37.9 (100.2)	39.5 (103.1)	41.1 (106.0)	41.0 (105.8)	39.1 (102.4)	30.7 (87.3)	19.6 (67.3)	6.9 (44.4)	41.1 (106.0)
Mean daily maximum °C (°F)	−10.7 (12.7)	−5.7 (21.7)	6.3 (43.3)	20.0 (68.0)	26.6 (79.9)	31.6 (88.9)	33.0 (91.4)	31.4 (88.5)	25.2 (77.4)	15.8 (60.4)	3.6 (38.5)	−7.1 (19.2)	14.2 (57.5)
Daily mean °C (°F)	−14.8 (5.4)	−9.9 (14.2)	1.6 (34.9)	13.5 (56.3)	20.0 (68.0)	25.2 (77.4)	26.6 (79.9)	24.8 (76.6)	18.6 (65.5)	9.6 (49.3)	−0.4 (31.3)	−10.6 (12.9)	8.7 (47.6)
Mean daily minimum °C (°F)	−18.3 (−0.9)	−13.6 (7.5)	−2.5 (27.5)	7.9 (46.2)	13.9 (57.0)	19.3 (66.7)	20.8 (69.4)	18.8 (65.8)	12.7 (54.9)	4.7 (40.5)	−3.6 (25.5)	−13.6 (7.5)	3.9 (39.0)
Record low °C (°F)	−31.1 (−24.0)	−29.3 (−20.7)	−21.6 (−6.9)	−8.1 (17.4)	1.8 (35.2)	7.3 (45.1)	10.7 (51.3)	6.2 (43.2)	0.2 (32.4)	−7.1 (19.2)	−19.2 (−2.6)	−30.5 (−22.9)	−31.1 (−24.0)
Average precipitation mm (inches)	7.7 (0.30)	8.2 (0.32)	10.3 (0.41)	25.5 (1.00)	29.9 (1.18)	18.7 (0.74)	20.3 (0.80)	17.7 (0.70)	13.5 (0.53)	15.7 (0.62)	12.4 (0.49)	10.5 (0.41)	190.4 (7.5)
Average precipitation days (≥ 0.1 mm)	10.5	7.8	5.2	6.3	7.0	7.5	8.1	6.8	4.3	4.2	6.4	11.9	86
Average snowy days	18.1	13.7	6.6	1.0	0	0	0	0	0	0.6	7.2	18.7	65.9
Average relative humidity (%)	80	78	69	47	40	40	43	44	46	59	74	81	58
Mean monthly sunshine hours	96.0	120.4	179.5	249.0	300.2	294.5	309.5	299.8	260.4	212.2	110.9	78.5	2,510.9
Percentage possible sunshine	33	40	48	61	65	64	67	70	71	64	39	29	54
Source: China Meteorological Administration
