= 131st Cavalry Regiment =

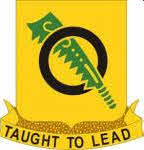
- 131st Cavalry Regiment's Distinctive Unit Insignia
- Disbanded: 1959-2008 (as 193rd Tank Battalion); 2008-2016 (as 131st Cavalry Regiment)
- Allegiance: United States
- Branch: United States Army
- Nickname: Southern Leaders
- Motto: Taught to Lead

The 131st Cavalry Regiment was a regiment of the Alabama National Guard. It was authorized the special designation "Southern Leaders" and its motto was "Taught to Lead".

== History ==
The 131st Armor Regiment was activated in 1959 and was granted the coat of arms of its component unit, the 193rd Tank Battalion, the following year. The regiment was redesignated the 131st Cavalry Regiment in 2008.

In 2015 the 1st Squadron of the 131st Cavalry deployed to Romania where it participated in the "Red Dragon" exercise with the 528th Light Reconnaissance Battalion of the Romanian Land Forces as part of the State Partnership Program.

On September 11, 2016, the regiment was deactivated and its only component unit - the 1st Squadron - was redesignated the 1st Battalion of the 173rd Infantry Regiment. The 131st Cavalry Regiment's heraldry, special designation, and motto were subsequently reassigned to the newly created 173rd Infantry Regiment. The battalion was aligned with the 256th Infantry Brigade Combat Team in December.
