= Emin County =

Emin County 额敏县 (Chinese) دۆربىلجىن ناھىيىسى (Uyghur) ءدوربىلجىن اۋدانى (Kazakh) Dörbiljin
- County
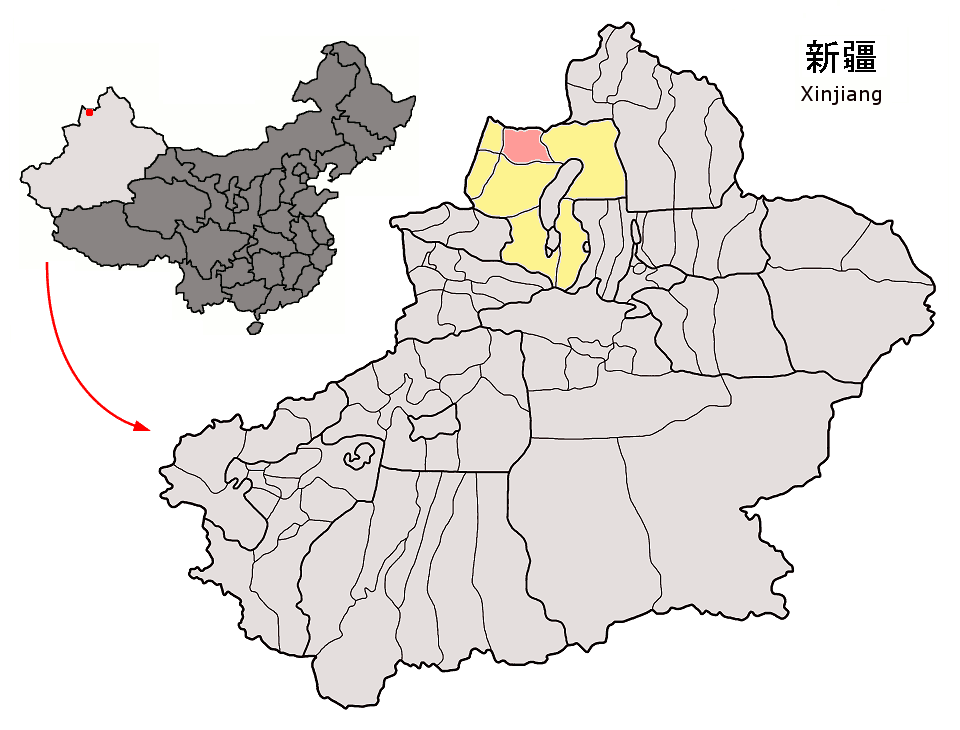
- Location of Emin County (red) within Tacheng Prefecture (yellow) and Xinjiang

- Location of the seat in Xinjiang Emin (Xinjiang) Emin (China)
- Country: China
- Autonomous region: Xinjiang
- Prefecture: Tacheng
- County seat: Dörbiljin (Emin) Town

Area
  - Total: 9,157.81 km^{2} (3,535.85 sq mi)

Population (2020)
  - Total: 188,642
  - Density: 20.5990/km^{2} (53.3512/sq mi)
- Time zone: UTC+8 (China Standard (Note: Locals in Xinjiang frequently observe UTC+6 (Xinjiang Time), 2 hours behind Beijing.))
- Website: www.xjem.gov.cn

Emin County

Chinese name
- Simplified Chinese: 额敏县
- Traditional Chinese: 額敏縣
Transcriptions
Standard Mandarin
- Hanyu Pinyin: Émǐn xiàn
Yue: Cantonese
- Jyutping: ngaak^{6}man^{5} jyun^{2}

Alternative Chinese name
- Simplified Chinese: 杜尔布勒津县
- Traditional Chinese: 杜爾布勒津縣
Transcriptions
Standard Mandarin
- Hanyu Pinyin: Dù'ěrbùlēijīn Xiàn

Mongolian name
- Mongolian Cyrillic: Дөрвөлжин шянь
- Mongolian script: ᠳᠥᠷᠪᠡᠯᠵᠢᠨ ᠰᠢᠶᠠᠨ
Transcriptions
- SASM/GNC: Dörbeljin siyan

Uyghur name
- Uyghur: دۆربىلجىن ناھىيىسى
Transcriptions
- Latin Yëziqi: Dörbiljin Nahiyisi
- Yengi Yeziⱪ: Dɵrbiljin Naⱨiyisi
- SASM/GNC: Dörbiljin Naⱨiyisi
- Siril Yëziqi: Дөрбилҗин Наһийиси

Kazakh name
- Kazakh: ءدوربىلجىن اۋدانى; Дөрбілжін ауданы Dórbiljin aýdany

Emin County (Chinese: 额敏县) also known as Dörbiljin County (Uyghur: دۆربىلجىن ناھىيىسى; Kazakh: ءدوربىلجىن اۋدانى), is a county situated in the north of the Xinjiang Uyghur Autonomous Region and is under the administration of the Tacheng Prefecture, bordering Kazakhstan's districts of Tarbagatay and Zaysan. It has an area of 9,092 km^{2} (3,510 sq mi) with a population of 200,000. The local postal code is 834600.

Geographically, the county is located on the southern slopes of the Tarbagatai Mountains and in the Emin Valley. The main watercourse is the Emin (Emil) River.

== Name ==
The place was originally named Dörbiljin. In 1918, Yang Zengxin, the governor of Xinjiang, petitioned to have a county set up in the Emin Valley. The new county was named after the Emin (Emil) River. Nevertheless, the official Kazakh and Uyghur name of the county is still "Dörbiljin".

== Transportation ==
The Karamay–Tacheng Railway (under construction as of 2017) will serve Emin County.

== Demographics ==
The proportion of nationalities in Emin (Dörbiljin) County
Nationality	Percentage
Han People	51.6%
Kazakhs	36.3%
Uyghurs	3.9%
Hui People	3.7%
Mongols	2.9%
Russian	0.2%
Kyrgyz	0.1%
Manchu people	0.1%
Uzbek people	0.1%
Others	1.3%
Source of the population statistics :

== Administrative divisions ==
Emin County is divided into 6 towns, 3 townships, and 2 ethnic townships.

Name	Simplified Chinese	Hanyu Pinyin	Uyghur (UEY)	Uyghur Latin (ULY)	Kazakh (Arabic script)	Kazakh (Cyrillic script)	Notes	Administrative division code
Towns
Dörbiljin Town (Emin Town)	额敏镇	Émǐn Zhèn	دۆربىلجىن بازىرى	dörbiljin baziri	ءدوربىلجىن قالاشىعى	Дөрбілжін қалашығы		654221100
Üsh Qarasu Town	玉什喀拉苏镇	Yùshíkālāsū Zhèn	ئۈچ قاراسۇ بازىرى	Üch qarasu baziri	ءۇشقاراسۋ قالاشىعى	Үшқарасу қалашығы		654221101
Jël'aghash Town	杰勒阿尕什镇	Jiélè'āgǎshí Zhèn	جېلئاغاش بازىرى	jël'aghash baziri	جەلاعاش قالاشىعى	Желағаш қалашығы		654221102
Shanghu Town	上户镇	Shànghú Zhèn	شاڭخۇ بازىرى	shangxu baziri	شاڭحۋ قالاشىعى	Шaңхy қалашығы		654221103
Maralsu Town	玛热勒苏镇	Mǎrèlèsū Zhèn	مارالسۇ بازىرى	maralsu baziri	مارالسۋ قالاشىعى	Маралсу қалашығы		654221104
Qara'ëmil Town	喀拉也木勒镇	Kālāyěmùlè Zhèn	قارا ئېمىل بازىرى	qara'ëmil baziri	قاراەمىل قالاشىعى	Қараеміл қалашығы		654221105
Township
Jiaoqu Township (City Outskrits Township)	郊区乡	Jiāoqū Xiāng	شەھەر ئەتراپى يېزىسى	sheher Etrapi yëzisi	قالا ماڭى اۋىلى	Қала маңы ауылы		654221200
Küre Township	喇嘛昭乡	Lǎmazhāo Xiāng	كۈرە يېزىسى	küre yëzisi	كۇرە اۋىلى	Күре ауылы		654221207
Gürti Township (Erdaoqiao Township)	二道桥乡	Èrdàoqiáo Xiāng	گۈرتى يېزىسى	gürti yëzisi	كۇرتى اۋىلى (ارداۋچياۋ)	Күрті ауылы (Ардаучиау)		654221207
Ethnic Townships
Emalgulin Mongol Ethnic Township	额玛勒郭楞蒙古民族乡	Émǎlèguōléng Ménggǔ Mínzúxiāng	ئېمالغۇلىن موڭغۇل يېزىسى	Ëmalghulin mongghul yëzisi	ەمالعولىن موڭعۇل ۇلتتىق اۋىلى	Емалғұлин Моңғұл Ұлттық ауылы	(Mongolian) ᠡᠮᠢᠯᠢ ᠭᠣᠣᠯ ᠤᠨ ᠮᠣᠩᠭᠣᠯ ᠦᠨᠳᠦᠰᠦᠲᠡᠨ ᠦ ᠰᠢᠶᠠᠩ; Эмиль Голын монгол үндэстэний шиян	654221202
Hujeriti Mongol Ethnic Township	霍吉尔特蒙古民族乡	Huòjí'ěrtè Ménggǔ Mínzúxiāng	خۇجېرىتى موڭغۇل يېزىسى	xujëriti mongghul yëzisi	قوجىرتى موڭعۇل ۇلتتىق اۋىلى	Құжырты Моңғұл Ұлттық ауылы	(Mongolian) ᠭᠤᠤᠵᠡᠭᠡᠷᠳᠡ ᠮᠣᠩᠭᠣᠯ ᠦᠨᠳᠦᠰᠦᠲᠡᠨ ᠦ ᠰᠢᠶᠠᠩ; Гуузээрд монгол үндэстэний шиян	654221208

Others

- Erzhihe Ranch (Quyghansu) (二支河牧场) (قۇيغانسۇ چارۋىچىلىق مەيدانى) (قۇيعانسۋ مال شارۋاشىلىعى الاڭىنداعى)
- Jarbulaq Farm (加尔布拉克农场) (جاربۇلاق دېھقانچىلىق مەيدانى) (جاربۇلاق اۋىل شارۋاشىلىعى الاڭىنداعى)
- Kuoshibike Pedigree Ranch (阔什比克良种场) (كۆشبىك ئۇرۇق مەيدانى) (كوشبيكە سورتتى تۇقىم الاڭىنداعى)
- Saryemil Ranch (萨尔也木勒牧场) (سار ئېمىل چارۋىچىلىق مەيدانى) (سارىەمىل مال شارۋاشىلىعى الاڭىنداعى)
- Emil Ranch (也木勒牧场) (ئېمىل چارۋىچىلىق مەيدانى) (ەمىل مال شارۋاشىلىعى الاڭىنداعى)
- Tacheng Prefectural Pedigree Sheep Farm (塔城地区种羊场) (تارباغاتاي ۋىلايەتلىك نەسىللىك قوي فېرمىسى) (تارباعاتاي ايماقتىق اسىل تۇقىمدى قوي فەرماسى)
- Uzunbulaq Ranch (吾宗布拉克牧场) (ئۇزۇنبۇلاق چارۋىچىلىق مەيدانى) (ۇزىنبۇلاق مال شارۋاشىلىعى الاڭىنداعى)
- Unity Farm of 9th Division, XPCC (兵团农九师团结农场) (ئىتتىپاق دېھقانچىلىق مەيدانى) (بىرلىك اۋىل شارۋاشىلىعى الاڭىنداعى)
- 165th Regiment of the XPCC (兵团一百六十五团) (165-تۇەن مەيدانى) (165-تۋان الاڭىنداعى)
- 166th Regiment of the XPCC (兵团一百六十六团) (166-تۇەن مەيدانى) (166-تۋان الاڭىنداعى)
- 167th Regiment of the XPCC (兵团一百六十七团) (167-تۇەن مەيدانى) (167-تۋان الاڭىنداعى)
- 168th Regiment of the XPCC (兵团一百六十八团) (168-تۇەن مەيدانى) (168-تۋان الاڭىنداعى)
- 169th Regiment of the XPCC (兵团一百六十九团) (169-تۇەن مەيدانى) (169-تۋان الاڭىنداعى)
- 170th Regiment of the XPCC (兵团一百七十团) (170-تۇەن مەيدانى) (170-تۋان الاڭىنداعى)

== Climate ==
Climate data for Emin, elevation 522 m (1,713 ft), (1991–2020 normals, extremes 1981–2010)
Month	Jan	Feb	Mar	Apr	May	Jun	Jul	Aug	Sep	Oct	Nov	Dec	Year
Record high °C (°F)	6.3 (43.3)	8.3 (46.9)	25.5 (77.9)	33.8 (92.8)	37.5 (99.5)	38.3 (100.9)	41.3 (106.3)	41.1 (106.0)	37.5 (99.5)	32.1 (89.8)	21.2 (70.2)	11.4 (52.5)	41.3 (106.3)
Mean daily maximum °C (°F)	−5.1 (22.8)	−1.5 (29.3)	6.5 (43.7)	18.4 (65.1)	24.4 (75.9)	29.4 (84.9)	31.2 (88.2)	30.3 (86.5)	24.4 (75.9)	16.2 (61.2)	5.3 (41.5)	−3.1 (26.4)	14.7 (58.5)
Daily mean °C (°F)	−11.9 (10.6)	−8.5 (16.7)	0.1 (32.2)	11.0 (51.8)	16.9 (62.4)	21.8 (71.2)	23.5 (74.3)	22.2 (72.0)	16.3 (61.3)	8.4 (47.1)	−0.8 (30.6)	−9.1 (15.6)	7.5 (45.5)
Mean daily minimum °C (°F)	−17.0 (1.4)	−14.1 (6.6)	−5.1 (22.8)	4.9 (40.8)	10.2 (50.4)	14.9 (58.8)	16.6 (61.9)	15.1 (59.2)	9.3 (48.7)	2.5 (36.5)	−5.1 (22.8)	−13.6 (7.5)	1.5 (34.8)
Record low °C (°F)	−37.8 (−36.0)	−33.9 (−29.0)	−29.8 (−21.6)	−11.2 (11.8)	−3.0 (26.6)	2.5 (36.5)	8.3 (46.9)	3.9 (39.0)	−2.6 (27.3)	−14.1 (6.6)	−31.8 (−25.2)	−34.1 (−29.4)	−37.8 (−36.0)
Average precipitation mm (inches)	18.3 (0.72)	15.6 (0.61)	19.6 (0.77)	33.3 (1.31)	34.9 (1.37)	23.1 (0.91)	28.9 (1.14)	20.2 (0.80)	18.9 (0.74)	20.9 (0.82)	33.3 (1.31)	24.0 (0.94)	291 (11.44)
Average precipitation days (≥ 0.1 mm)	8.8	8.5	8.3	8.6	8.5	8.2	8.5	6.2	5.6	7.4	9.9	10.5	99
Average snowy days	10.9	10.7	6.9	1.6	0.1	0	0	0	0	1.9	8.5	12.6	53.2
Average relative humidity (%)	75	73	68	53	47	49	52	49	48	58	72	76	60
Mean monthly sunshine hours	143.4	164.5	223.1	256.0	317.0	325.0	330.5	317.7	267.4	208.4	136.7	119.4	2,809.1
Percentage possible sunshine	50	55	59	62	68	69	70	74	73	63	50	45	62
Source: China Meteorological Administration

== Notable people ==
- Asgat Iskhakov – Chinese Tatar politician (1921–1976)
