= Junggar Basin =

Sedimentary basin in Xinjiang, China

The location of Junggar Basin (in red)

The Junggar Basin (simplified Chinese: 准噶尔盆地; traditional Chinese: 準噶爾盆地), also known as the Dzungarian Basin or Zungarian Basin, is one of the largest sedimentary basins in Northwest China. It is located in Dzungaria in northern Xinjiang, and enclosed by the Tarbagatai Mountains of Kazakhstan in the northwest, the Altai Mountains of Mongolia in the northeast, and the Heavenly Mountains (Tian Shan) in the south.

The geology of Junggar Basin mainly consists of sedimentary rocks underlain by igneous and metamorphic basement rocks. The basement of the basin was largely formed during the development of the Pangea supercontinent during complex tectonic events from Precambrian to late Paleozoic time. The basin developed as a series of foreland basins – in other words, basins developing immediately in front of growing mountain ranges – from Permian time to the Quaternary period. The basin's preserved sedimentary records show that the climate during the Mesozoic era was marked by a transition from humid to arid conditions as monsoonal climatic effects waned.

The Junggar basin is rich in geological resources (e.g. petroleum, coal and ore deposits) due to effects of volcanism and sedimentary deposition. According to Guinness World Records it is a land location remotest from open sea with great-circle distance of 2,648 km (1,645 miles) from the nearest open sea at 46°16′8″N 86°40′2″E.

== Regional tectonic setting ==
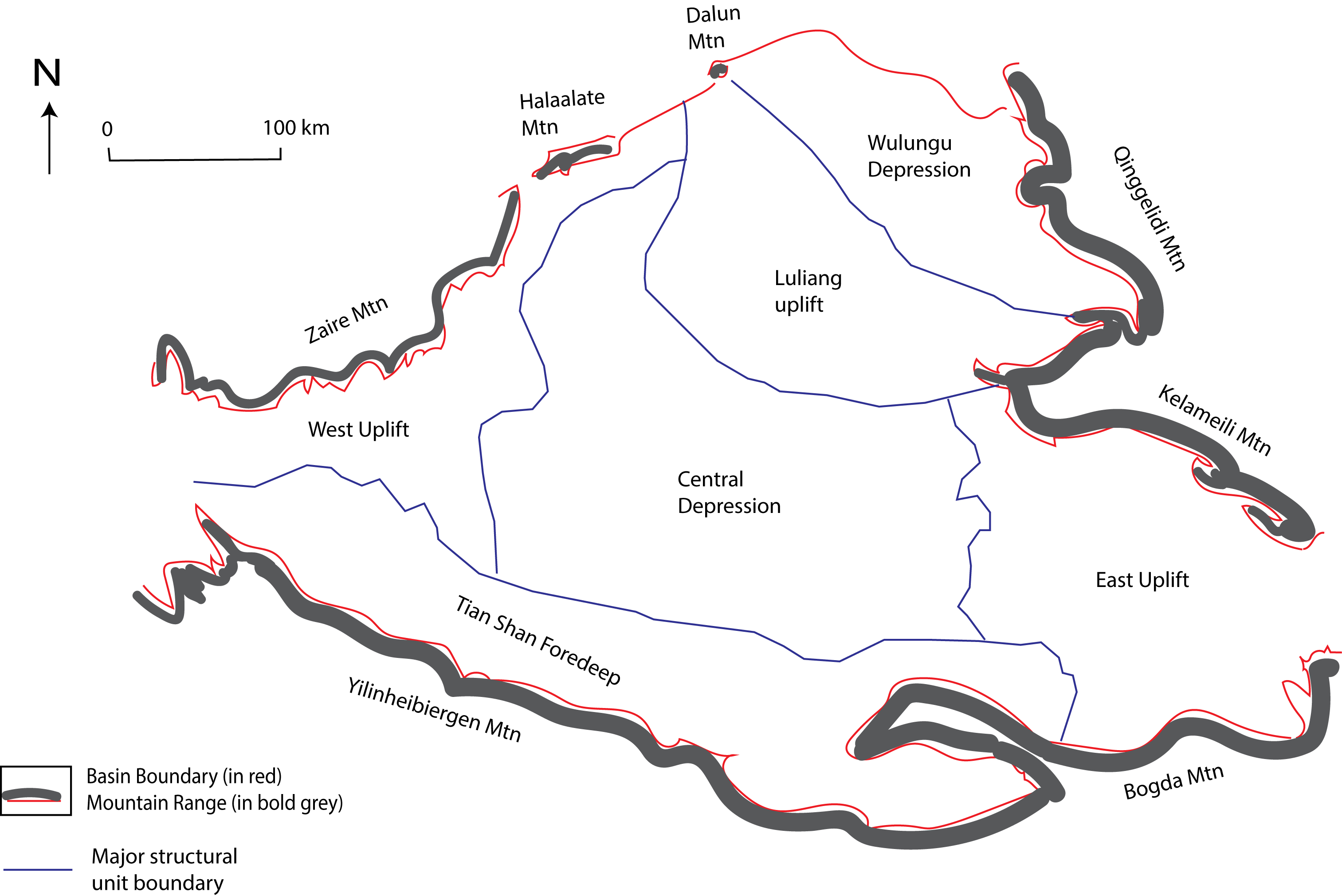
Simplified Geological map shows the main geological setting of Junggar Basin. Modified from Cao et al. (2017)

The major structural components of the Junggar Basin divided into six parts:

1. Wulungu Depression were formed by faulting and flat depression. There was about 2,000 – 4,000 m thick sedimentary layers that deposited from Permian to the present.
2. Luliang uplift (Sangequan uplift) was surrounded by narrow but steeply dipping at the north and wide but gently dipping at the south. There were about 1,100 – 4,000 m thick sedimentary layers and the complete layer from Permian to the present can be found in the southern part. Also, the plunging fold was found in this area.
3. Central Depression was formed by three major lowland plains where are in Manas, Central, and Wucaiwan. There were 5,000 m thick sedimentary layers from Carboniferous to Quaternary.
4. West Uplift consists of Chepaizi-Paotai uplift and Urho-Karamay monocline.
  - Chepaizi-Paotai uplift formed by eastward plunging fold with faulting. The footwall includes Jurassic-Quaternary sedimentary layers while the hanging wall consists of post-Carboniferous sedimentary layers.
  - Urho-Karamay monocline was formed with thrust fault along the west-northwest boundary of the basin. The Indo-Australian plate collision during Neogene resulted in uplift of the northern Junggar basin. This also resulted in re-activation of Permian thrust faults, produced faults on basement rocks and rifting on basin margin to form Karamay-Urho monocline. This area concentrated abundant hydrocarbons on the anticline part.
5. East Uplift (Zhangpenggou-Qitai uplift) was formed by deformations in several times. The formation of NE-trend plunging fold in this area activated the faulting of basement rocks.
6. Tian Shan Foredeep formed during lower-middle Triassic since the Tian Shan has uplifted continuously. During Cretaceous, the basin sank again and thus water depth became shallow due to tectonic deformations. In Paleogene, the size of the lake kept reducing and the eastern basin become a landmass. Also, there was further subsidence of Tian Shan Foredeep because of the formation of Himalayan in Paleogene.

== Geology ==
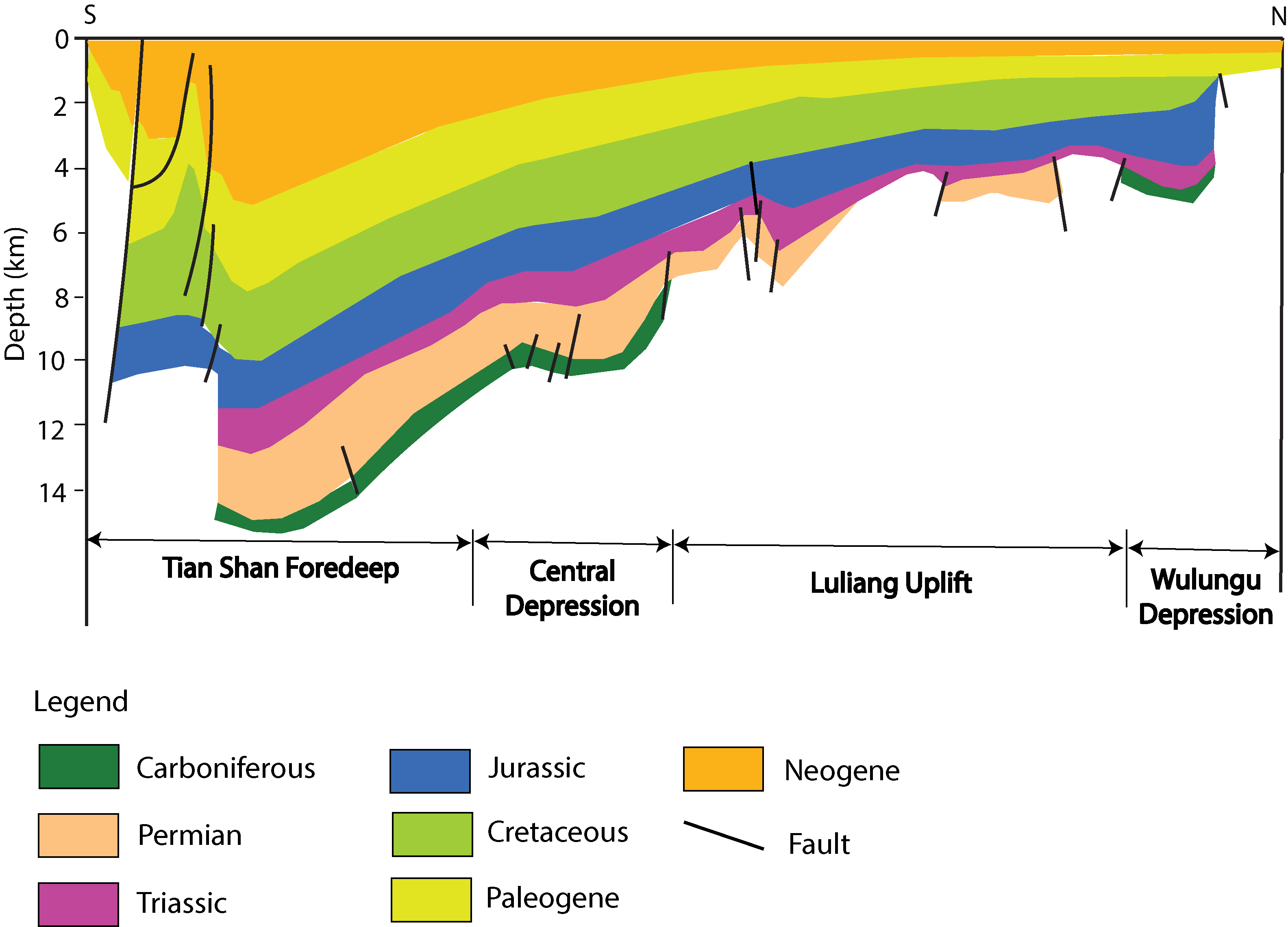
Cross-section of Junggar Basin. This shows the thickness of each sedimentary layers and structures across the basin area. Modified from Bian et al. (2010)

=== Basement rock of Junggar Basin ===
In Precambrian section was made up of felsic-intermediate granite with the inclusion of greenstones and ophiolites, where the Paleozoic section consists of mainly potassium- and sodium-deficient extrusive rocks. The basalts in the basement which indicated trapped late Paleozoic oceanic crust that came from the mantle.

=== Sedimentary stratigraphy ===
The sedimentary facies started to be dominant in Permian. The layers continuously deposited fluvial and lacustrine facies until the present day, mostly containing conglomerate, sandstone, siltstone, and mudstone.

Major stratigraphic units in the Junggar basin from Carboniferous are shown in ascending order in the following table:

Time	Period	Northwest	South	East
Time	Period	Rock unit (Distinct geological features)	Rock unit (Distinct geological features)	Rock unit (Distinct geological features)
Quaternary	Holocene	Terrestrial sediments with regional mud volcanoes and evaporite		
Quaternary	Pleistocene	glacial tills and eolian loess & gravels		
Tertiary	Neogene	Changjihe Group (Dark-brown mudstone, siltstone & sandstone with thin conglomerate & limestone)	Dushanzi Formation (Thickly-bed shale interbedded with sandstone & calcite grains)	
Tertiary	Neogene	Suosuoquan Formation (Mudstone, sandstone)	Taxihe Formation (Shale with ostracods, dolomitic sandstone)	
Tertiary	Neogene	Suosuoquan Formation (Mudstone, sandstone)	Shawan Formation (Orange-red sandy mudstone)	
Tertiary	Paleogene	Ulungurhe Formation (quartzose sandstone & mudstone)	Anjihaihe Formation (Green shale with marls)	
Tertiary	Paleogene	Honglishan Formation (medium-grained sandstone & mudstone)	Ziniquanzi Formation (Orange-red sandy shale)	
Cretaceous	Upper	Ailika Formation (Mudstone at upper unit but conglomerate at lower unit)	Donggou Formation (Sandy shale, siltstone, sandstone & conglomerate, some calcite nodules)	
Cretaceous	Lower	Kalaza megasequence (99-154 Ma) (Sandstone with marls, but mudstone and shale dominated in southern part. Conglomerate with cross-bedding structure at lowest unit. Presence of gypsum and fossil fish.)		
Jurassic	Upper	Kalaza megasequence (99-154 Ma) (Sandstone with marls, but mudstone and shale dominated in southern part. Conglomerate with cross-bedding structure at lowest unit. Presence of gypsum and fossil fish.)		
Jurassic	Upper	Shishugou megasequence (154-169 Ma) (Sandy mudstone to sandstone, with calcite materials and dinosaur fossils.)		
Jurassic	Middle	Shishugou megasequence (154-169 Ma) (Sandy mudstone to sandstone, with calcite materials and dinosaur fossils.)		
Jurassic	Middle	Sangonghe megasequence (169-195 Ma) (Presence of mudcracks in lower unit, coal red beds and dinosaur tracks at the top unit. Petrified woods were preserved.)		
Jurassic	Lower	Sangonghe megasequence (169-195 Ma) (Presence of mudcracks in lower unit, coal red beds and dinosaur tracks at the top unit. Petrified woods were preserved.)		
Jurassic	Lower	Badaowan megasequence (195-206 Ma) (Conglomerates in southern and eastern part. Massive mudstone beds and soft-sediment deformation in northwest. Widespread coals were present. Petrified woods and plant fossils were preserved.)		
Triassic	Upper	Haojiagou Formation (Yellow silty shale with some coal)		Xiaoquangou Group (Yellow conglomerate, sandstone, mudstone & shale)
Triassic	Upper	Huangshanjie Formation (Greyish-green sandstone & mudstone)		Xiaoquangou Group (Yellow conglomerate, sandstone, mudstone & shale)
Triassic	Middle	Kelamayi Formation (Conglomerate, sandstone with graded bedding)		Xiaoquangou Group (Yellow conglomerate, sandstone, mudstone & shale)
Triassic	Lower	Baikouquan Formation (Red conglomerate, sandstone & mudstone)	Shangcangfanggou Group (orange-red conglomerate with red mudstone)	
Permian	Upper	Urho Group (siltstone, sandstone & conglomerate)	Xiacanfanggou Group (Greyish-green mudstone with sandstone, with some purple-red conglomerate and plant fossils)	Pingdiquan Group (orange-red alluvial sandstone & conglomerate, with shale)
Permian	Upper	Urho Group (siltstone, sandstone & conglomerate)	Shangjijicaozi Group (Greyish-green feldspathic sandstone & mudstone, some fossiliferous limestone and black oil-shale)	Pingdiquan Group (orange-red alluvial sandstone & conglomerate, with shale)
Permian	Lower	Xiazijie Group (orange-red clastic sedimentary rocks)	Xiajijicaozi Group (limestone with the presence of stromatolite)	Chidi Group (Grey mudstone, sandstone, conglomerate)
Carboniferous	Upper	Jiamuhe Group (Organe-red conglomerate, and fossil plant-bearing sandstone & volcanic flows)	Bashan Group (pyroclastic turbidite, locally thinly-bedded limestone)	Shiqiantan Group (Conglomerate, sandstone, calcareous shale)
Carboniferous	Lower		Dishuiquan Group (Grey tuff with regional limestone included brachiopod fossils, and pillow lava)	
Precambrian to Devonian		Basement rocks (various plutonic and volcanic rocks, ophiolites, turbidites tuffaceous and metasedimentary rocks)		

== Paleoclimate and environment ==
Throughout Mesozoic, Junggar Basin was mainly in the fluvial and lake depositional environment.

The climate in the late Permian showed the fluctuation between dry- or wet-dominated climate. The pieces of evidence included the presence of both organic beds and red beds. In the early Triassic, reddish sedimentary rocks formed that indicated the dominance of semi-arid climate.

During Late Triassic-Early Jurassic, the Junggar basin was in a warm and wet climate due to the effect of continental monsoonal climate. From middle to late Jurassic, the climate shifted as a seasonal arid climate that initiated from the northeast and then widespread to the whole basin. This is because the Pangea started to break apart that halted the effect from the mega-monsoon system. Therefore, the basin became affected by westerlies. The westerlies contained the lesser moisture that has come from the northwest since the marine areas gradually minimized to the recent Caspian Sea. With the continuous uplift along the Tian Shan, the orographic effect around the basin intensifies the rain-shadow effect. The prominent rain-shadow effect results in a warmer seasonal arid climate in the basin. At the same time, the lakes in the basin had higher salinity and lower sedimentation influx.

== Tectonic evolution ==
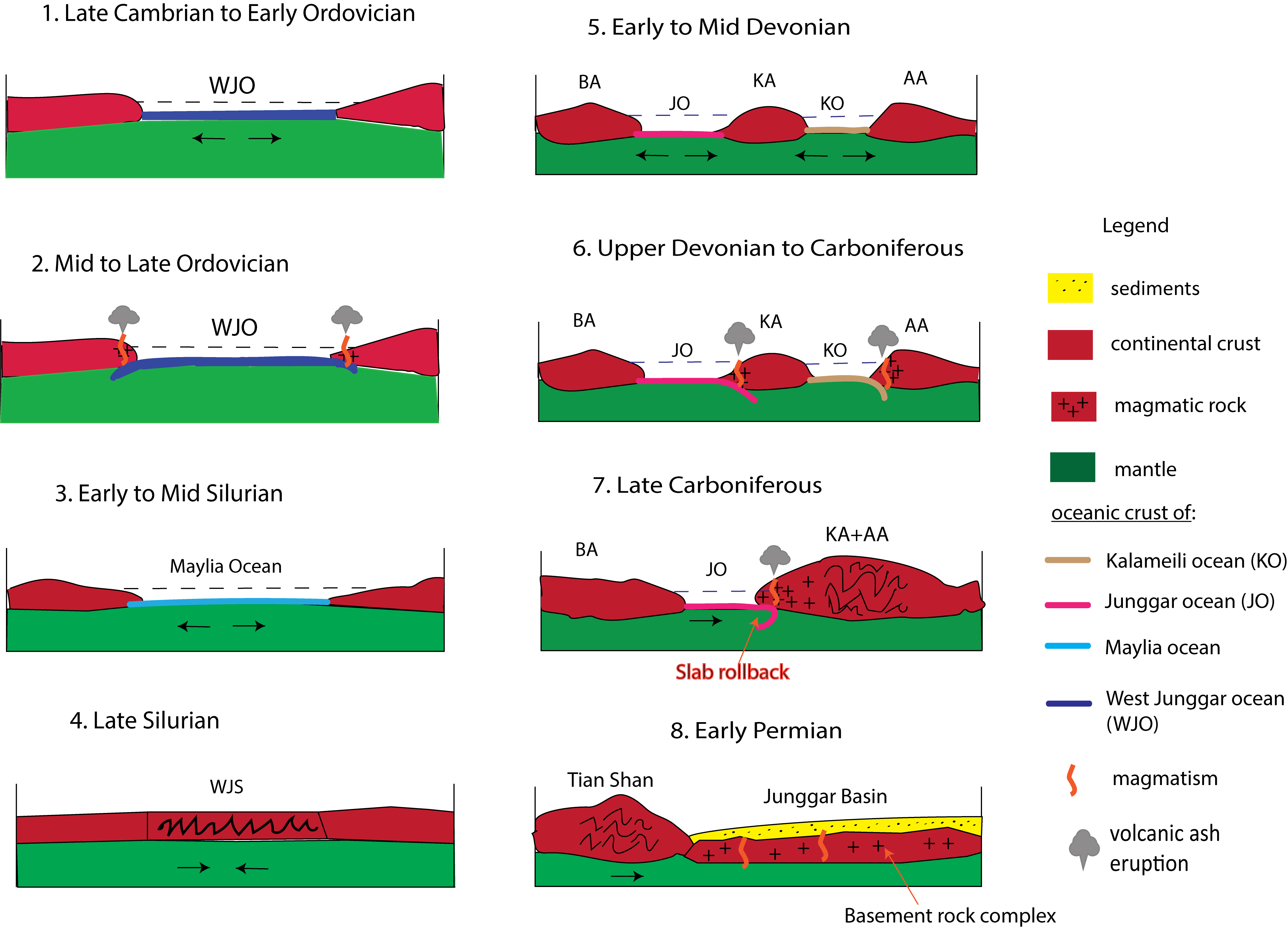
The simplified geological evolutionary diagrams of basement evolution in the Junggar Basin region. 1. Rifting formed West Junggar Ocean (WJO) basin (in deep blue). 2. the termination of intra-plate oceanic magmatism, and subduction events formed the present Tangbale and Hongguleleng ophiolites (they represent the integration for the crust of West Junggar Ocean). 3. Maylia ocean basin (in pale blue) formed by rifting. 4. Continental plates converged and folded up the ocean to form West Junggar residue sea. 5. Rifting occurred again to form Junggar Ocean (JO) (in pink) and Kelamaili Ocean (KO) (in brown), which showed separation from Bogda arc (BA), Kalameili arc (KA) and Altai Arc (AA). 6. JO subducted over KA while KO subducted over AA. 7. Junggar ocean crust subducted over the combined Kelamaili-Altai arc and showed slab rollback. 8. With the influence of Tian Shan collision and anorogenic magmatism from local extensional events, Junggar area subsides to form Junggar basin. Modified from Zhao et al. (2003), Carroll et al. (1990), Buckman et al. (2004), Han et al. (2018).

=== Pre-Permian (before 290 Ma): basement rock evolution ===
Xinjiang paleocraton was pulled apart for a continental rifting episode to form extensional basins in Late Cambrian. The continuous divergence of the continental crust during late Cambrian to Ordovician shaped the West Junggar Ocean. The West Junggar Ocean presented as the present Tangbale and Honguleleng ophiolites from intra-plate volcanism, and then this volcanism shut in mid-upper Ordovician. The Ordovician first ocean basin indicated that eastern Junggar was over passive margin. Another rifting event established the Mayilashan ocean basin and back-arc basin in east Junggar during Silurian. However, the compressional environment restricted the two landforms so that they ended up shut and folded in the late Silurian. This eventually led to the convergence of Tarim, Kazakhstan and Siberian paleo-plates. They were from the original Xinjiang paleocraton that puzzled each other again.

Junggar Ocean and Kulumudi Ocean were produced from the third rifting event during lower-mid Devonian. Eventually, the Junggar ocean and Kulumudi Ocean moved towards the north and undergone the subduction from upper Devonian to Late-Carboniferous. At the same time, several volcanic arcs were developed during subduction. Three plates (Tarim, Kazakhstan, and Siberian) converged together to form a trapped ocean that surrounded volcanic arc and orogens in Mid-Carboniferous. Alkali-rich granites with gold deposits intruded the converged plates. This revealed the partial melting of the oceanic crust. This also marked as the last subduction event following the post-collisional stage in Late-Carboniferous. Besides, Such intrusive rocks demonstrated that this was the last melting episode of oceanic crust. As part of the Eurasian plate started to combine continental crusts for the three plates, to consolidate them as another modern stable continental block.

==== Underplating events ====
The mafic-ultramafic igneous rocks formed due to underplating with crustal stretching during Carboniferous to Permian. The magma underplating during Carboniferous to Permian (330-250 Ma) period heated up the lower crust and thus the crust got hotter. The following cooling crustal episode led to part of the mountain belt sink by thermal subsidence, which ended up forming the Junggar Basin. Another magma underplating event occurred in the Mesozoic era. This was forming heterogenic silica-rich igneous rocks due to the partial melting of numerous oceanic crusts contaminated with mantle wedge.

=== Permian to Present (From 290 Ma): Junggar Basin evolution ===
With the influence of Variscan orogeny, Early Permian marine facies changed into the terrestrial environment during Late Permian. This is because orogenic compression and crustal thickening resulted in higher sedimentation and withdrawn of the sea. At that time, widespread uplift occurred with subsidence formed a graben at first. Then, the area gradually became a mountain-trapped peripheral foreland basin due to high-temperature and relaxing subsidence from the regional extension. Some also suggested this landform caused by the combined effect of shearing and extension or thrusting from crustal shortening. Starting from Permian, Junggar Basin was formed to initiate the foreland basin cycle. There presented extensional shearing and continuous deposition of non-marine foreland basin-fill till Triassic. Since the level of the trapped lake in the basin was rising, finer deposits covered widespread the basin with denudation. This also marked as the end of the foreland basin cycle. From Jurassic to Palaeogene, the Junggar Basin undergone intra-continental depression. There was covered in braided delta with few lakes and increasing subsidence rate towards the south from 20 to 120 m/Ma during Jurassic. The collision of the Lhasa block from the south resulted that the delta formed along the margin of the basin. Also, the deeper lake was at the basin centre during Lower Cretaceous. Afterward, the southward lake depression leading the basin centre shift to the south in the Upper Cretaceous period. In Paleogene, braid-delta developed over the basin where sediments entered from the mountains of the surrounding basin. Starting from Neogene, the thrust fault in the Junggar Basin was reactivated. At the same time, there was rapid uplift of Tian Shan since Himalayan orogeny formed by the collision between Indo-plate and Eurasian Plate. This developed an alluvial-rich delta system around shallow lakes with the clastic sediments influx from uplifted Tian Shan and the northern part of the basin.

The animated schematic geological evolutionary map shows the change of facies and the corresponding locations, from Triassic to Paleogene. This showed the basin evolution through three stages: (1) foreland basin from Permian to Triassic. (2) Intracontinental depression from Jurassic to Palaeogene. (3) Reactivated foreland basin from Neogene to the present. Modified from Bian et al. (2010).

== Geological resources ==
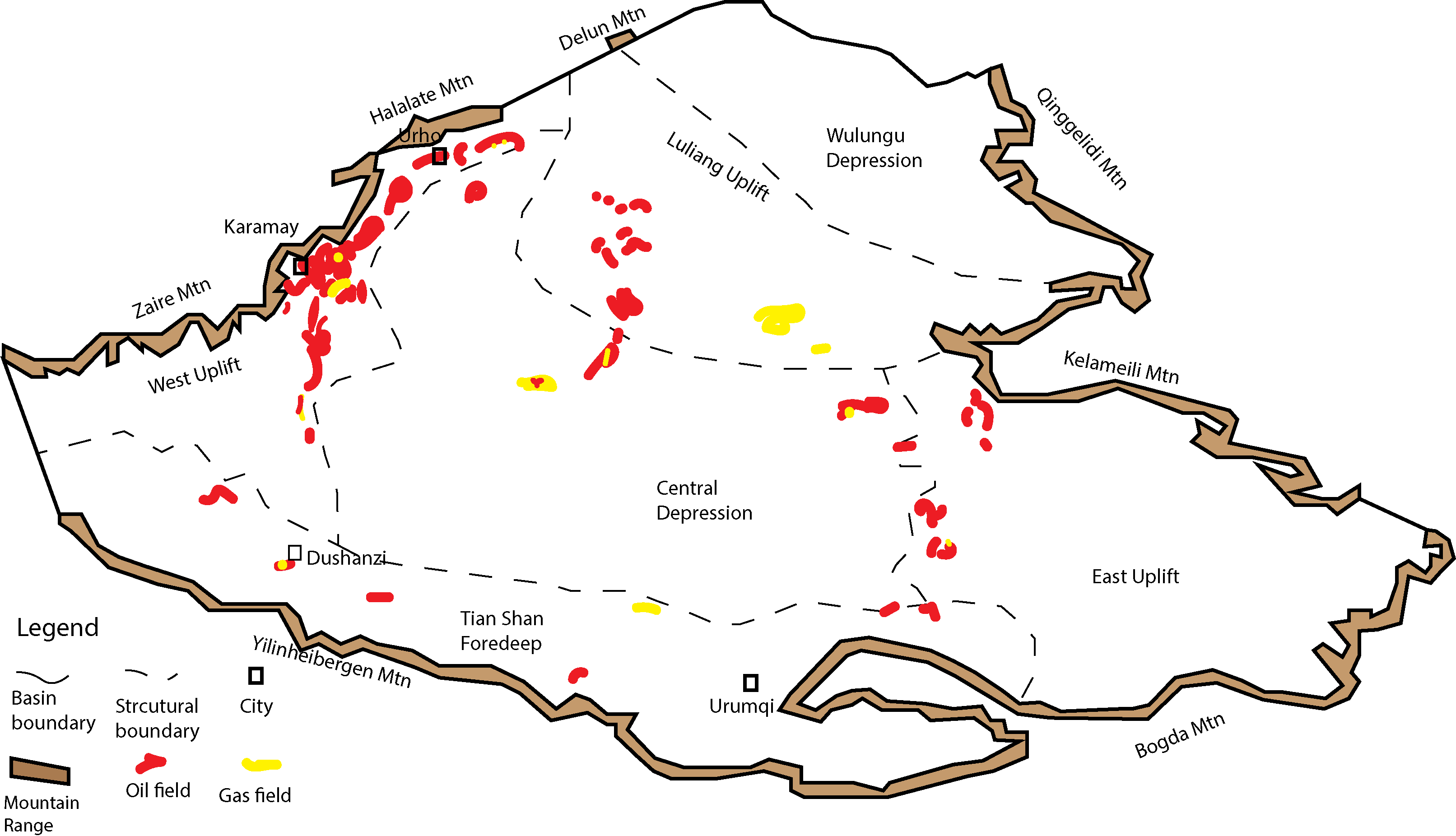
The schematic map shows the distribution of oil and gas fields in the Junggar Basin. Mostly accumulated in West Uplift area. Modified from Zhang et al. (2015).

=== Petroleum system ===
Junggar Basin contains the third-largest petroleum reservoirs in China. About two-thirds of oil can be found in the Karamay-Urho monocline area. There was formed in Carboniferous deep-sea sedimentary rocks and lake sedimentary layers from Permian to Tertiary. For Carboniferous oil and gas deposits in this area, they were moved upward and accumulated in the Permian period and Mesozoic era sandstones. Then, the layers altered as the structural trap locations by tectonic activities in the later stage. Petroleum is dominant in Karamay, Baikouquan, Urho, Dushanzi, and Qigu. The oil and gas fields can be found on Tertiary Dushanzi sandstone. Besides, gas fields are found in the Karamay as well as the inland region of the basin.

Besides, Tian Shan Foredeep in the southern Junggar Basin (including Urumqi) is also available for the petroleum resources. The petroleum there were formed due to rapid subsidence, regional ductile with mobile intrusion, and cross-cutting on anticlines by orogenic activity (probably in Neogene) from the Tian Shan. Part of the oil-bearing sedimentary rocks was deposited in the salty oxygen-deficient lake environment during Permian. The crude oil in this sedimentary rocks formed by remains of algae and humus.

=== Coal ===
Bituminous coal was found in Tian Shan Foredeep. It was deposited in the lake or swamp environment in the Early to Middle Jurassic periods. For example, Badaowan, Sangonghe, and Xishanyao Formation. About 18 gigatonnes of coal can be recovered in Tian Shan Foredeep. Apart from Tian Shan Foredeep, the coal can be found in the base of alluvial fan and nearby the margin of lakes in the eastern and western margin of Junggar Basin.

=== Ore deposits ===
Ore deposits in the Junggar Basin were mainly formed in the Paleozoic era which was related to tectonic development. The followings are the available ore deposits in Junggar Basin:

- Porphyry copper-gold deposits found in the west and northeast of the Junggar Basin.
- Iron deposits found in the eastern part of the basin due to early subduction events during Lower Carboniferous.
- During post-collision extensional events in Permian, gold deposits found on the west side and tin deposits found on the east side.

== See also ==
- Dzungaria
- Tarim Basin
