= Manas Lake =

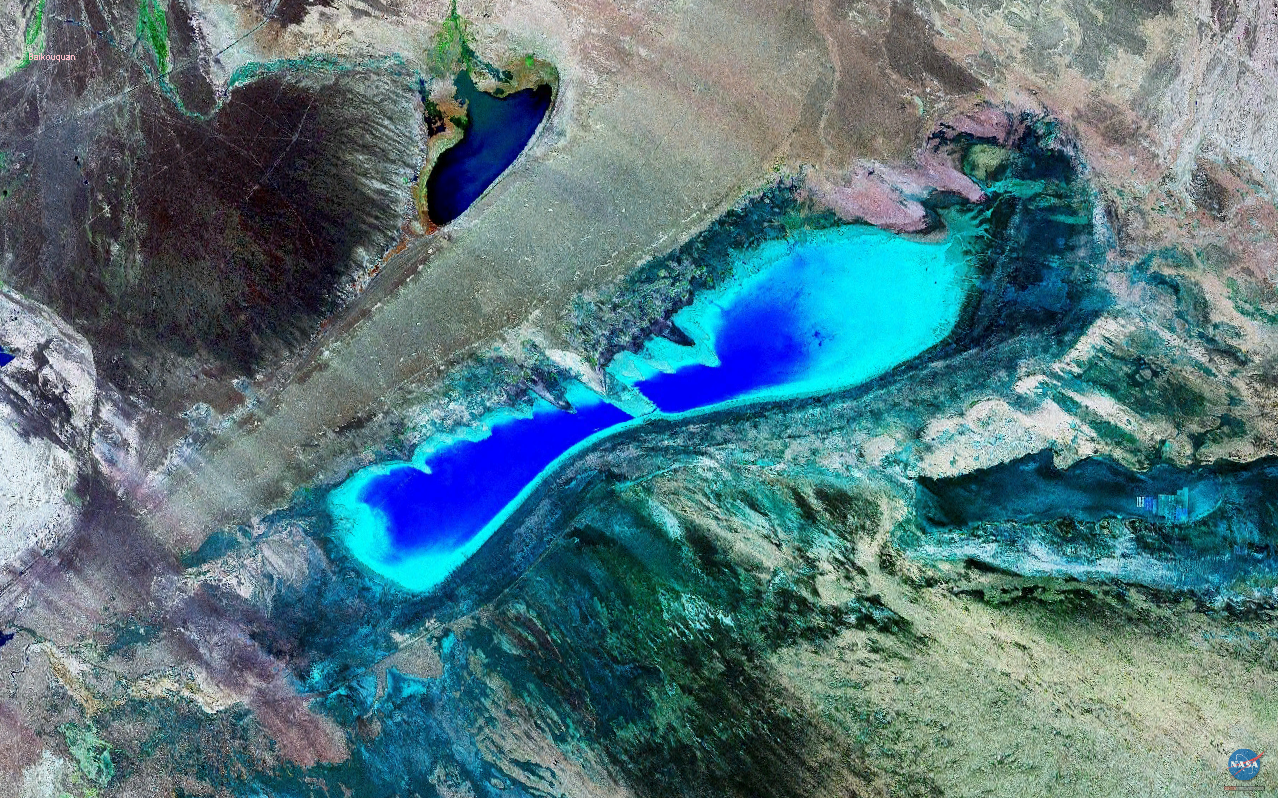
- A LANDSAT image of Lake Manas (center) and Lake Ailik (top)

- Location within Dzungaria
- Location: Hoboksar Mongol Autonomous County, Xinjiang, China
- Coordinates: 45°48′00″N 85°56′00″E
- Type: salt lake
- Primary inflows: Manas River
- Surface area: 550 square kilometres (210 sq mi)

Lake Manas (center) and Lake Ailik (top)

The Manas Lake (simplified Chinese: 玛纳斯湖; traditional Chinese: 瑪納斯湖; pinyin: Mǎnàsī hú) is a salt lake in the Xinjiang Uighur Autonomous Region, China. It is located in the western part of the Dzungarian Basin, within the Gurbantünggüt Desert. Administratively, the lake is in Hoboksar Mongol Autonomous County; the closest urban settlement is Urho District of Karamay City, some 40 kilometres (25 mi) to the northwest of the lake.

The Manas Lake used to be known as the Yihehake Lake (Chinese: 伊赫哈克湖; pinyin: Yīhèhākè hú) in the past.

Notionally, Lake Manas is considered the endpoint of the Manas River, flowing from the Tian Shan mountains. In practice, however, the river bed is usually dry where it reaches the lake (45°41′00″N 85°44′00″E), and little river water reaches the lake.

The Manas Lake area is characterized by an arid climate with hot summers; the average annual precipitation of merely 63.7 millimetres (2.51 in), as compared to the average annual evaporation of 3,110.5 millimetres (122.46 in); which means that without an inflow of water from outside, the lake's water level can drop very quickly. Over the second half of the 20th century and the early years of the 21st century, it went through the cycle of shrinking, drying up, recovering, or existing as an intermittent lake.

== Geological history ==
According to the research by Chinese geologists, the area occupied by today's Manas Lake was in the past part of a much larger lake, the Old Manas Lake, which existed in the northwestern part of the Dzungarian Basin. It is believed that the Old Manas Lake was formed in the Early Pleistocene and existed throughout the Early Quaternary. Due to tectonic movements in the Middle Quaternary, many important rivers that used to flow to the Old Manas Lake started flowing elsewhere. The Irtysh now flows toward the Arctic Ocean, and the Ulungur River ends in the Ulungur Lake; the Maqiao River, south of Lake Manas, does not reach it either.

Study of the old alluvial fans and lacustrine terraces seems to indicate that the Old Manas Lake's level was at about 280 meters above the sea level.

As the Old Manas Lake lost most of its water sources, its water level dropped in the Late Quaternary, and it split into several lakes, including the Manas Lake, the Ailik Lake (which presently is the end point of the Baiyang River), and the Alan Nur.

According to the early 20th century maps, a large lake in the region of today's Manas Lake was the Alan Nur (Chinese: 阿雅尔诺尔; pinyin: Āyǎ'ěr Nuò'ěr, or (Chinese: 艾兰诺尔; pinyin: Àilán Nuò'ěr, located to the west of today's Manas Lake (45°42′00″N 85°23′00″E); that was the lake into which the Manas River flowed. Earlier (in 18th-19th centuries) the Alan Nur would receive, besides the Manas, also the waters of the Hutubi River (呼图壁河) and Santun River (三屯河). These two rivers flow from the Tian Shan into the Dzungarian Basin in Hutubi and Changji Counties; nowadays, they disappear in the desert a long distance away from the Manas Lake, but in the period under consideration they would merge and reach the Alan Nur.

Even though the Manas River flowed into the Alan Nur, the lake now known as the Manas Lake existed as well; it was fed primarily by streams coming from the northern rim of the Zhungarian Basin (i.e., from the Saur Mountains); this is indicated by old alluvial fans still existing at the pertinent locations.

It is believed that due to tectonic movements in the early 20th century, the earth's surface around Alan Nur was rising and around Manas Lake, lowering; besides, the lower course of the Manas River was silting up with the sediment brought by the river. As a result, in 1915 the main stream of the Manas River changed its course, now flowing to the Manas Lake; however, a small branch feeding into the Alan Nur remained. (One can see the bifurcation point of the now-dry river beds at 45°38′45″N 85°27′01″E, with the main channel going to the north-east and entering the Manas Lake around 45°43′20″N 85°39′20″E, while the old channel enters the former Alan Nur at 45°40′00″N 85°24′10″E.)

== Recent history ==
In the 1950s and early 1960s, large scale development of irrigated agriculture started in the upper and middle reaches of the Manas River (the Shihezi/Manas County region, the area where the river leaves the Tian Shan and enters the Zhungarian Basin). The Manas River Irrigation District had been fully in that area by 1962; the system was designed to use up to 1.36 cubic kilometres (0.33 cu mi) of water per year. As a result, little water flowed in the Manas River downstream of the district, and even less reached the Manas Lake, let alone the Alan Nur.

Consequently, the Alan Nur, whose water surface still occupied the area of 238 square kilometres (92 sq mi) in the 1950s, had completely dried up by the 1960s. Now it is a bare plain of saline soil, at the elevation of 261–263 m above the sea level.

The Manas Lake is now reached by the waters of the eponymous river only intermittently, but the lake also receives water from seasonal streams flowing from the Saur Mountains at the northern edge of the Dzungarian Basin; besides, it is fed by groundwater. The Manas Lake's bed is at about 247 m above the level, and its water surface is at 253–255 m above the level.

According to Chinese researchers, the recent history of the Manas Lake and its neighbors can be divided into two stages. From the late 1950s and until 1999 (for the Manas Lake and the Alan Nur) or 2001 (for the Ailik and the Lesser Ailik), the lakes were shrinking or drying up. Since 1999 (for the Manas and the Alan Nur) or 2001 (the two Ailiks), the lakes have entered the stage of at least partial recovery, which (especially for the Ailiks) is related to the arrival of the Irtysh water into the Baiyang River over the Irtysh–Karamay Canal.
