= Hoboksar Mongol Autonomous County =

Hoboksar Mongol Autonomous County Hefeng, Qobuqsar
- Autonomous county

Name transcription(s)
  - Chinese: 和布克赛尔蒙古自治县
  - Uyghur: قوبۇقسار موڭغۇل ئاپتونوم ناھىيىسى
  - Mongolian: ᠬᠣᠪᠣᠭᠰᠠᠶᠢᠷ ᠮᠣᠩᠭᠣᠯ ᠥᠪᠡᠷᠲᠡᠭᠡᠨ ᠵᠠᠰᠠᠬᠤ ᠰᠢᠶᠠᠨ
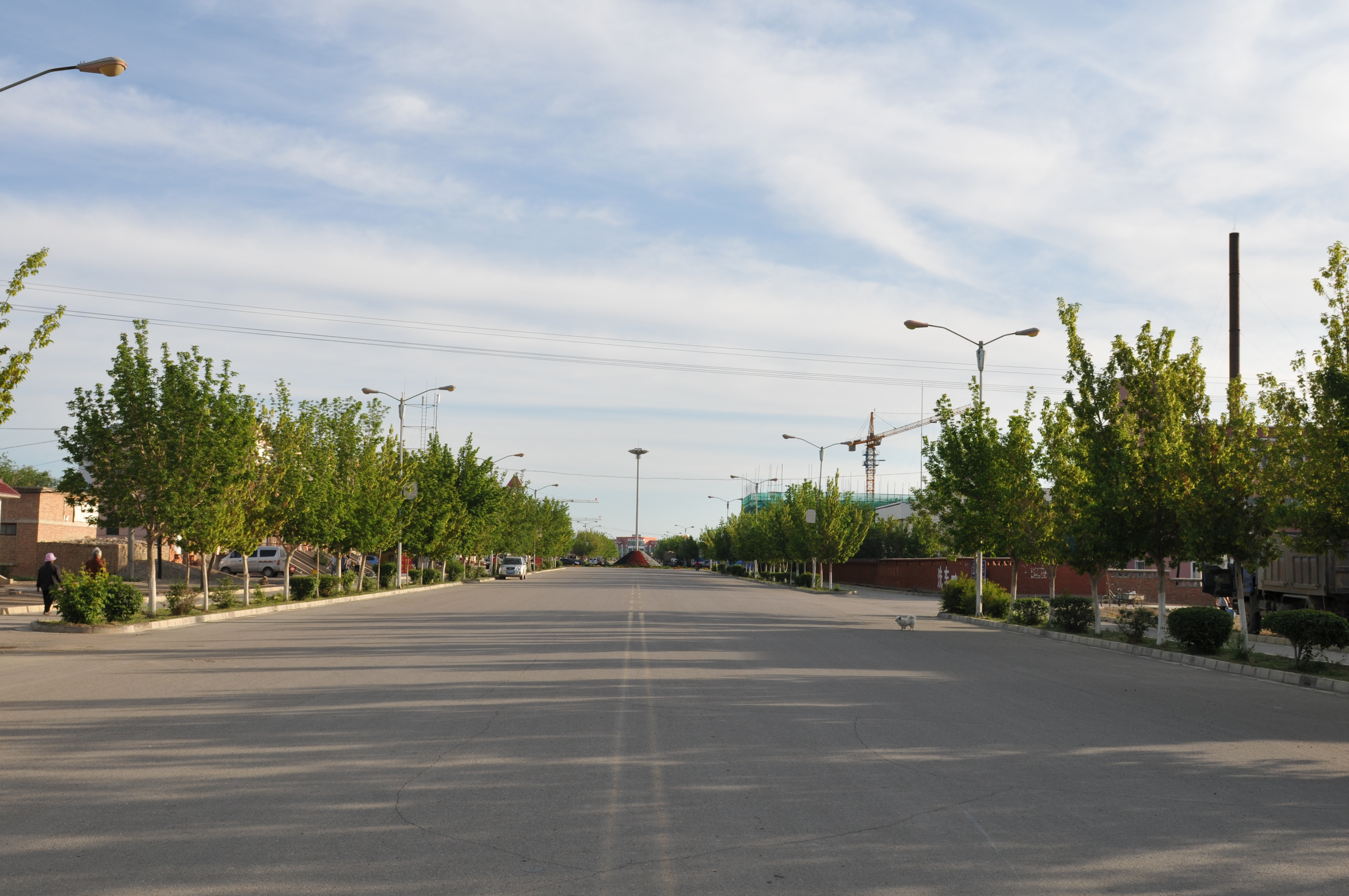

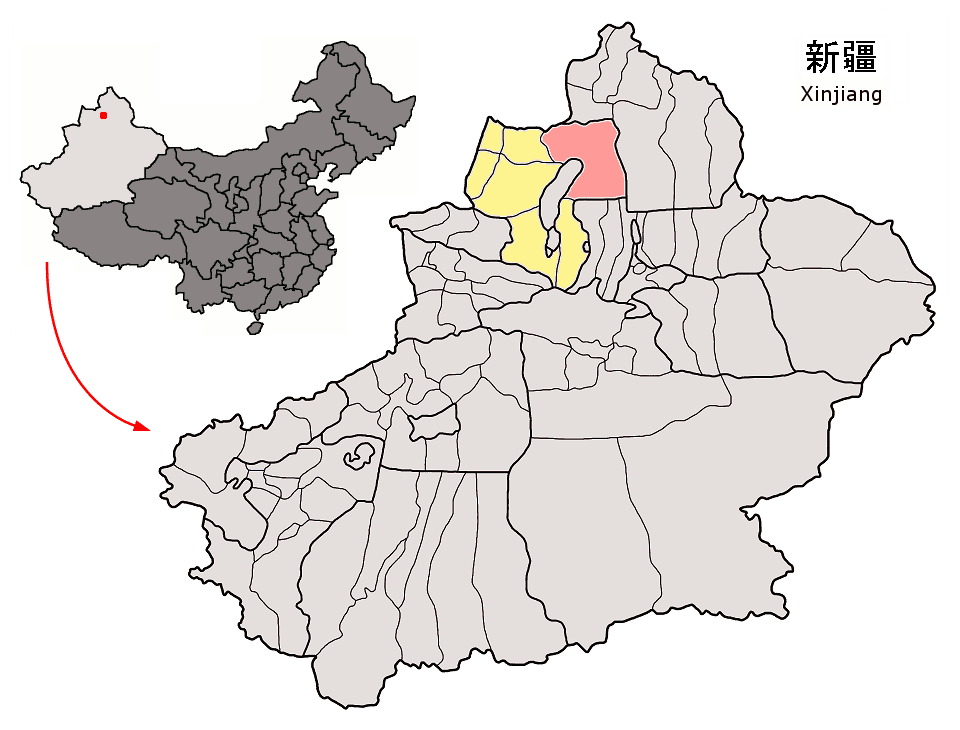

- Location in Xinjiang Hoboksar (Xinjiang) Hoboksar (China)
- Coordinates: 46°47′N 85°43′E
- Country: China
- Autonomous region: Xinjiang
- Prefecture: Tacheng
- Township-level divisions: 2 towns and 5 townships
- County seat: Hoboksar Town

Area
  - Total: 28,784 km^{2} (11,114 sq mi)

Population (2020)
  - Total: 61,785
  - Density: 2.1465/km^{2} (5.5594/sq mi)
- Time zone: UTC+8 (China Standard (Note: Locals in Xinjiang frequently observe UTC+6 (Xinjiang Time), 2 hours behind Beijing.))
- Postal code: 834400
- Area code: 0901
- Website: www.xjhbk.gov.cn

Hoboksar Mongol Autonomous County

Chinese name
- Simplified Chinese: 和布克赛尔蒙古自治县
- Traditional Chinese: 和布克賽爾蒙古自治縣
Transcriptions
Standard Mandarin
- Hanyu Pinyin: Hébùkèsài'ěr Měnggǔ Zìzhìxiàn
- Wade–Giles: He^{4}-pu^{4}-k'e^{4}-sai^{4}-erh^{3} Meng^{3}-ku^{3} Tzu^{4}-chih^{4}-hsien^{4}

Alternative Chinese name
- Simplified Chinese: 和丰县
- Traditional Chinese: 和豐縣
Transcriptions
Standard Mandarin
- Hanyu Pinyin: Héfēng Xiàn

Mongolian name
- Mongolian Cyrillic: Ховогсайр Монгол өөртөө засах шянь
- Mongolian script: ᠬᠣᠪᠣᠭᠰᠠᠶᠢᠷ ᠮᠣᠩᠭᠣᠯ ᠥᠪᠡᠷᠲᠡᠭᠡᠨ ᠵᠠᠰᠠᠬᠤ ᠰᠢᠶᠠᠨ
Transcriptions
- SASM/GNC: Qoboγsayir mongγol öbertegen ǰasaqu siyan

Uyghur name
- Uyghur: قوبۇقسار موڭغۇل ئاپتونوم ناھىيىسى
Transcriptions
- Latin Yëziqi: Qobuqsar Mongghul Aptonom Nahiyisi
- Siril Yëziqi: Қобуқсар Моңғул Аптоном Наһийиси

Kazakh name
- Kazakh: قوبىقسارى موڭعۇل اۆتونوميالىق اۋدانى; Qobyqsary Moñğūl avtonomialy audany Қобықсары Моңғұл автономйалы ауданы

Oirat name
- Oirat: ᡍᡆᡋᡆᡎᠰᠠᡅᠷᡅ ᡏᡆᡊᡎᡆᠯ ᡄᡋᡄᠷᡄᡃᠨ ᠴᠠᠰᠠᡍᡇ ᠱᡅᡕᠠᠨ; Qoboγsairi mongγol ebereen zasaqu šiyan

Hoboksar Mongol Autonomous County (Chinese: 和布克赛尔蒙古自治县; pinyin: Hébùkèsài'ěr Měnggǔ Zìzhìxiàn), sometimes referred to by the historic name Hefeng County (和丰县; Héfēng Xiàn), is an autonomous county for Mongols in the middle-north of Xinjiang Uyghur Autonomous Region, Western China. It is under the administration of Tacheng Prefecture. The county has an area of 28,784 km^{2} (11,114 sq mi) with a population of 62,100 (as of 2010 Census). It has eight towns and townships and seven farms; Hoboksar Town is the county seat.

== Name ==
The name Hoboksar (Ховогсайр) is a portmanteau of "Hobok" (ховог) and "Sar" (сайр) from the Mongolian language. Hobok refers to the Hobok River and means "sika deer"; the river was named after its river basin within huge amount of sika deer in the past. Sar refers to the Salair Mountains and literally means "horseback"; the mountain was named after its shape, which resembles a horseback.

== History ==
At the latest starting from the Qin dynasty, the Saka people appeared in the place of present Hoboksar area. This was followed by the Usans and Xiongnu people.

The place was part of Usan State in the Western Han period. It was merged to the Rear Jushi Kingdom (車師後國) in the Eastern Han and Three Kingdoms periods. It was part of Xianbei during the Jin period, part of Rouran Khaganate, followed by the First Turkic Khaganate, Western Turkic Khaganate in the period of Northern and Southern dynasties. It was under the administration of Kunling Protectorate (崑陵都護府) of the Tang dynasty in 657, ruled by Karluks in 789, Uyghur Khaganate in 808, Kyrgyz Khaganate in 840 and Qara Khitai in 1127, it was merged to the Yuan dynasty in 1218, became the dominion of Ögedei Khan in 1225, then after that, the territory of Beshbalik Province (Beiting) and Almaliq Province in 1280, it was merged to Chagatai Khanate during 1324 – 1328.

It was part of Eastern Chagatai Khanate (Beshbalik Khaganate) in 1370, the herd land of the Oirats tribe in the 5th century. After Batur's succession to Khong Tayiji in 1636, he quickly unified the Oirats tribes in the North Xinjiang, with Hoboksar as the base camp. Batur built a castle five kilometers away southeast of the present county seat of Hoboksar Town between 1639 – 1643.

The place of Hoboksar was under jurisdiction of Tarbaghatay Ministerial Attache (塔爾巴哈臺參贊大臣, under leadship of the General of Ili; "Tarbaghatay", the present Tacheng Prefecture) in 1758. The Torghut Tribe back far away from the south side of Russian Volga River, immigrated to Hoboksar in 1771.

Hoxtolgay Xianzuo (和什托洛蓋縣佐, similar to a division under vice county magistrate; in the present Hoxtolgay Town) under jurisdiction of Shawan County, was formed in 1915 and it was transferred to Tacheng Circuit (塔城道) in 1916. Hoxtolgay Xianzuo was changed to Hoxtolgay Division (和什托洛蓋設治局) and the Hefeng Division (和豐設治局) was formed in 1941. Hefeng County (和豐縣) was organized in 1944 and its county seat is in the present Hoboksar Town. Hefeng County was renamed to Hoboksar Mongol Autonomous County on September 10, 1954.

== Geography ==
Hoboksar County is located south of the Tarbagatai-Saur mountain range and its northern part, where most of the county's population lives, receives some water from streams (such as the Baiyang River) flowing from the snow-capped mountains. The southeastern part of the county is in Gurbantünggüt Desert.

Historically, the large Alan Nur and Manas Lake were located in the desert southwestern part of the county; they received water, at least intermittently, both from the streams flowing across the desert from the north and from the south (via the Manas River). Due to the increasing water diversion for irrigation and other human needs, as well as geological processes, the Alan Nur has fully dried out, and the Manas Lake is in a fairly precarious situation as well.

The Irtysh–Karamay Canal, constructed around the turn of the 21st century, crosses the county's southeastern part; the canal's Fengcheng Reservoir is located on the county's border with Karamay City's Urho District.

A point situated some 30 miles ESE of Hoxtolgay Town is listed as the farthest point from the sea (at 46°16.8′N 86°40.2′E) by the Guinness Book of World Records. It is roughly 2646 kilometres away from the Arctic Ocean and a similar distance from the Bay of Bengal and the Arabian Sea (see Continental Pole of Inaccessibility for other candidates).

The "record-setting" location of the county attracted the attention of advertisers for the Corona beer brand, who staged and documented a trip of a few residents of the village of Bulin (布林), 46°43′13″N 86°7′59″E), in Hoboksar County's Qagankol Township to the sea coast in Hainan Island.

== Administrative divisions ==
Hoboksar administered 2 towns, 6 townships.

Name	Simplified Chinese	Hanyu Pinyin	Mongolian (Traditional)	Mongolian (Cyrillic)	Uyghur (UEY)	Uyghur Latin (ULY)	Kazakh (Arabic script)	Kazakh (Cyrillic script)	Administrative division code
Towns
Hoboksar Town	和布克赛尔镇	Hébùkèsài'ěr Zhèn	ᠬᠣᠪᠣᠭᠰᠠᠶᠢᠷ ᠬᠣᠲᠠ	Хувсайр балгас	قوبۇقسار بازىرى	qobuqsar baziri	قوبىقسارى قالاشىعى	Қобықсары қалашығы	654226100
Hoxtolgay Town	和什托洛盖镇	Héshítuōluògài Zhèn	ᠬᠣᠣᠰᠲᠣᠯᠣᠭᠠᠢ ᠪᠠᠯᠭᠠᠰᠤᠨ	Хостолгой балгас	قوشتولغاي بازىرى	qoshtolghay baziri	قوستولعاي قالاشىعى	Қостолғай қалашығы	654226101
Townships
Xazgat Township	夏孜盖乡	Xiàzīgài Xiāng	ᠱᠠᠭᠠᠵᠠᠭᠠᠢᠲᠤ ᠰᠢᠶᠠᠩ	Шаазгайт шиян	شازغەت يېزىسى	shazghet yëzisi	شازعەت اۋىلى	Шазғет ауылы	654226200
Tebkinusan Township	铁布肯乌散乡	Tiěbùkěnwūsàn Xiāng	ᠲᠡᠪᠬᠡᠨ᠋ᠤᠰᠤᠨ ᠰᠢᠶᠠᠩ	Дэвхөнөөсөн шиян	تېبكىن ئۇسان يېزىسى	tëbkin Usan yëzisi	تەكپىسۋ اۋىلى	Тәкпісу ауылы	654226201
Qagankol Township	查干库勒乡	Chágànkùlè Xiāng	ᠴᠠᠭᠠᠨ ᠭᠣᠤᠯ ᠰᠢᠶᠠᠩ	Цагаан гол шиян	چاغانكۆل يېزىسى	chaghanköl yëzisi	شاعانكول اۋىلى	Шағанкөл ауылы	654226202
Bayan Obo Township	巴音傲瓦乡	Bāyīn'àowǎ Xiāng	ᠪᠠᠶᠠᠨ᠋ᠣ᠋ᠪᠣᠭ᠎ᠠ ᠰᠢᠶᠠᠩ	Баянөваа шиян	بايىن ئاۋۋا يېزىسى	bayin Awwa yëzisi	بايىنوبا اۋىلى	Байыноба ауылы	654226203
Motge Township	莫特格乡	Mòtègé Xiāng	ᠮᠥᠲᠥᠭᠡᠢ ᠰᠢᠶᠠᠩ	Мөтүгэй шиян	مۆتگې يېزىسى	mötgë yëzisi	موتكە اۋىلى	Мөтке ауылы	654226204
Qahat Township	查和特乡	Cháhétè Xiāng	ᠴᠠᠬᠠᠲᠤ ᠰᠢᠶᠠᠩ	Цахад шиян	چاخېت يېزىسى	chaxgët yëzisi	شاعىتى اۋىلى	Шағыты ауылы	654226205

- Bag Urtubulag Ranch (巴嘎乌图布拉格牧场) (ᠪᠠᠭ᠎ᠠ ᠤᠷᠲᠤᠪᠤᠯᠠᠭ ᠮᠠᠯᠵᠢᠯ ᠤᠨ ᠲᠠᠯᠠᠪᠠᠢ) (باغ ئۇتبۇلاق چارۋىچىلىق مەيدانى) (باق ۇتىنبۇلاق مال شارۋاشىلىعى الاڭىنداعى)
- Bus Tungge Ranch (布斯屯格牧场) (Mongolian: ᠪᠦᠰᠡᠲᠦᠩᠭᠡ ᠮᠠᠯᠵᠢᠯ ᠤᠨ ᠲᠠᠯᠠᠪᠠᠢ) (بۈستۈڭگى چارۋىچىلىق مەيدانى) (بۇستۇڭگى مال شارۋاشىلىعى الاڭىنداعى)
- Ih Urtubulag Ranch (伊克乌图布拉格牧场) (Mongolian: ᠶᠡᠬᠡ ᠤᠷᠲᠤᠪᠤᠯᠠᠭ ᠮᠠᠯᠵᠢᠯ ᠤᠨ ᠲᠠᠯᠠᠪᠠᠢ) (ئىك ئۇتبۇلاق چارۋىچىلىق مەيدانى) (ەكى ۇتىنبۇلاق مال شارۋاشىلىعى الاڭىنداعى)
- Narin Hobok Ranch (那仁和布克牧场) (Mongolian: ᠨᠠᠷᠢᠨ ᠬᠣᠪᠣᠭ ᠮᠠᠯᠵᠢᠯ ᠤᠨ ᠲᠠᠯᠠᠪᠠᠢ) (نېرىن قوبىق چارۋىچىلىق مەيدانى) (نارىن قوبۇق مال شارۋاشىلىعى الاڭىنداعى)
- XPCC 184th Regiment (兵团一十八十四团) (Mongolian: 184 ᠳᠤᠭᠠᠷ ᠲᠤᠸᠠᠨ ᠲᠠᠯᠠᠪᠠᠢ) (184-تۇەن مەيدانى) (184-تۋان الاڭىنداعى)

== Climate ==
Climate data for Hoboksar, elevation 1,322 m (4,337 ft), (1991–2020 normals, extremes 1971–2020)
Month	Jan	Feb	Mar	Apr	May	Jun	Jul	Aug	Sep	Oct	Nov	Dec	Year
Record high °C (°F)	6.2 (43.2)	8.8 (47.8)	19.7 (67.5)	28.9 (84.0)	31.3 (88.3)	33.9 (93.0)	37.7 (99.9)	34.7 (94.5)	31.7 (89.1)	26.4 (79.5)	16.1 (61.0)	10.8 (51.4)	37.7 (99.9)
Mean daily maximum °C (°F)	−6.7 (19.9)	−3.4 (25.9)	3.8 (38.8)	13.3 (55.9)	19.4 (66.9)	24.4 (75.9)	25.9 (78.6)	24.6 (76.3)	18.6 (65.5)	10.5 (50.9)	1.1 (34.0)	−5.1 (22.8)	10.5 (50.9)
Daily mean °C (°F)	−12.8 (9.0)	−9.5 (14.9)	−2.3 (27.9)	6.8 (44.2)	12.8 (55.0)	18.1 (64.6)	19.7 (67.5)	18.1 (64.6)	12.1 (53.8)	4.3 (39.7)	−4.3 (24.3)	−10.7 (12.7)	4.4 (39.9)
Mean daily minimum °C (°F)	−16.9 (1.6)	−14.1 (6.6)	−7.1 (19.2)	1.2 (34.2)	6.8 (44.2)	12.2 (54.0)	14.1 (57.4)	12.3 (54.1)	6.5 (43.7)	−0.5 (31.1)	−8.2 (17.2)	−14.6 (5.7)	−0.7 (30.8)
Record low °C (°F)	−30.6 (−23.1)	−28.5 (−19.3)	−24.1 (−11.4)	−20.6 (−5.1)	−6.5 (20.3)	1.4 (34.5)	5.3 (41.5)	−0.7 (30.7)	−7.7 (18.1)	−16.7 (1.9)	−31.1 (−24.0)	−32.0 (−25.6)	−32.0 (−25.6)
Average precipitation mm (inches)	4.4 (0.17)	2.9 (0.11)	6.1 (0.24)	8.4 (0.33)	15.8 (0.62)	24.7 (0.97)	42.1 (1.66)	27.8 (1.09)	11.5 (0.45)	5.5 (0.22)	6.2 (0.24)	4.6 (0.18)	160 (6.28)
Average precipitation days (≥ 0.1 mm)	5.0	4.1	4.6	5.3	7.3	10.0	12.0	9.1	5.2	3.5	5.2	5.4	76.7
Average snowy days	8.1	7.1	7.1	2.5	0.4	0	0	0	0.3	2.8	7.6	9.2	45.1
Average relative humidity (%)	65	63	57	46	42	45	49	47	47	54	64	67	54
Mean monthly sunshine hours	172.6	188.7	245.1	265.5	307.5	290.9	291.5	292.2	267.2	227.7	156.3	144.8	2,850
Percentage possible sunshine	61	63	65	64	65	62	62	68	73	69	57	55	64
Source: China Meteorological AdministrationNOAA

== Demographics ==
The Chinese Mongols that live in Bayingolin and Hoboksar come from varied origins. A majority are Torghuts, who speak the Oirat language. Chahar Mongols who immigrated from Inner Mongolia also live in Hoboksar and Bayingolin, and there are also Uriankhai Mongols, who are considered Mongols in China but Tuvans to some outside observers. A fair number of Daur people and Dongxiang people live in Hoboksar especially and they speak Mongolic languages.

== Culture ==
Hoboksar is traditionally considered the place of origin of the Epic of Jangar. The Jangar Culture and Art Palace (江格尔文化艺术宫) was opened in the county in 2014.

== Transportation ==
China National Highway 217 and the new Kuytun–Beitun Railway both cross Hoboksar county along the same north–south corridor. There is daily passenger service at the Hoxtolgay station.
