= Dzungaria =

Geographical subregion in Northwest China

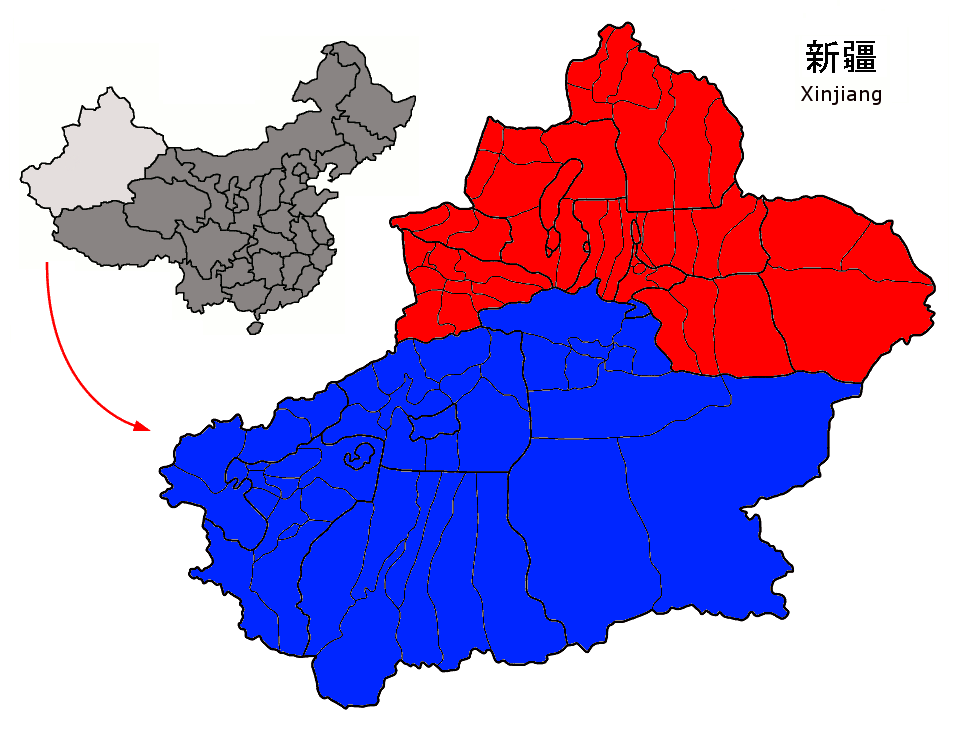
- Dzungaria / Beijiang Tarim Basin / Altishahr / Nanjiang

Chinese name
- Simplified Chinese: 准噶尔
- Traditional Chinese: 準噶爾
Transcriptions
Standard Mandarin
- Hanyu Pinyin: Zhǔngá'ěr
- Wade–Giles: Chun^{3}-ka^{2}'-erh^{3}
- IPA: [ʈʂwə̀nkǎàɚ]

Beijiang
- Chinese: 北疆
- Literal meaning: Northern Xinjiang
Transcriptions
Standard Mandarin
- Hanyu Pinyin: Běijiāng
- Wade–Giles: Pei^{3}-chiang^{1}
- IPA: [pèɪtɕjáŋ]

Mongolian name
- Mongolian Cyrillic: Зүүнгар нутаг
- Mongolian script: ᠵᠡᠭᠦᠨᠭᠠᠷ ᠨᠤᠲᠤᠭ
Transcriptions
- SASM/GNC: Jegünghar nutug

Uyghur name
- Uyghur: جوڭغار
Transcriptions
- Latin Yëziqi: Jongghar
- Yengi Yeziⱪ: Jongƣar
- Siril Yëziqi: Җоңғар

Manchu name
- Manchu script: ᠵᡠᠨ ᡤᠠᡵ
- Möllendorff: Jun gar

Kazakh name
- Kazakh: Жоңғария; Joñğaria جوڭعارىيا

Oirat name
- Oirat: ᠴᡈᡉᠨ ᡎᠠᠷ зүнһар

Dzungaria, (Note: /(d)zʊŋˈɡɛəriə/ (d)zuun-GAIR-ee-ə – from Mongolian зүүн гар züün gar 'left hand') also known as Northern Xinjiang or Beijiang, is a geographical subregion in Northwest China, consisting of the northern half of Xinjiang. Bound by the Altai Mountains to the north and the Tian Shan mountain range to the south, Dzungaria covers approximately 777,000 km^{2} (300,000 sq mi), and borders Kazakhstan to the west and Mongolia to the east. In contexts prior to the mid-18th century Dzungar genocide, the term "Dzungaria" could cover a wider area, coterminous with the Oirat-led Dzungar Khanate.

Although Dzungaria is geographically, historically, and ethnically distinct from the Tarim Basin or Southern Xinjiang (Nanjiang), the Manchu-led Qing dynasty integrated both areas into one province, Xinjiang. Dzungaria is Xinjiang's center of heavy industry, generates most of the region's GDP, and houses its political capital Ürümqi (Oirat for 'beautiful pasture'). As such, Dzungaria continues to attract intraprovincial and interprovincial migration to its cities. In contrast to the Tarim Basin, Dzungaria is relatively well integrated with the rest of China by rail and trade links.

== Background ==
Xinjiang has traditionally been divided into two geographically and ethnically distinct regions: Dzungaria, north of the Tian Shan mountains; and the Tarim Basin, south of the mountains. At the time of the Qing conquest of Xinjiang in 1759, Dzungaria was predominantly inhabited by steppe-dwelling, nomadic Tibetan-Buddhist Dzungars while the Tarim Basin was inhabited by predominantly oasis-dwelling, sedentary, Turkic Muslim farmers, now known as the Uyghurs. The Qing government was well aware of the differences between the inhabitants of the two regions, and initially ruled them as separate administrative units. However, after the Qing army's final pacification of the Tarim Basin in 1760, the Qing government began to describe Dzungaria and the Tarim Basin as one region called "Xinjiang" (lit. 'new frontier').

The Qing government officially unified Dzungaria and the Tarim Basin into one political entity called Xinjiang Province in 1884, despite protests by some officials who believed that the two regions were better off left separated. The geographic concept of Xinjiang was ultimately a construct of the Qing government; by the end of Qing rule in 1912, Xinjiang's native inhabitants had still not developed a distinct regional identity. The foundations for a regional identity were laid by the Qing government's 150-year-long policies of politically isolating Xinjiang from the rest of Central Asia and introducing Han and Hui settlers into the region. These policies pushed forward a cultural identity which sharply contrasted with both the rest of China and the rest of Central Asia.

== History and etymology ==
Before the 21st century, all or part of the region has been ruled or controlled by the Xiongnu Empire, Han dynasty, Xianbei state, Rouran Khaganate, Turkic Khaganate, Tang dynasty, Uyghur Khaganate, Yenisei Kyrgyz Khaganate, Liao dynasty, Kara-Khitan Khanate, Mongol Empire, Yuan dynasty, Chagatai Khanate, Moghulistan, Kara Del, Northern Yuan, Four Oirat, Dzungar Khanate, Qumul Khanate, Qing dynasty, the Republic of China, the Second East Turkestan Republic and since 1950, it has been under the control of the People's Republic of China.

=== Etymology ===
Dzungaria is named after the Dzungar Khanate that existed in Central Asia during the 17th and 18th centuries.

Dzungaria, or Zungharia, derives from the name of the Dzungar people, which comes from the Mongolian term Zűn Gar, or Jüün Gar (depending on the Mongolian dialect used). Zűn (or Jüün) means 'left' and Gar means 'hand'. The name originates from the notion that the Western Mongols (Oirats) were on the left-hand side when the Mongol Empire began its division into East and West Mongols. After this fragmentation, the western Mongolian nation was called Zuun Gar.

=== Pre-modern era ===
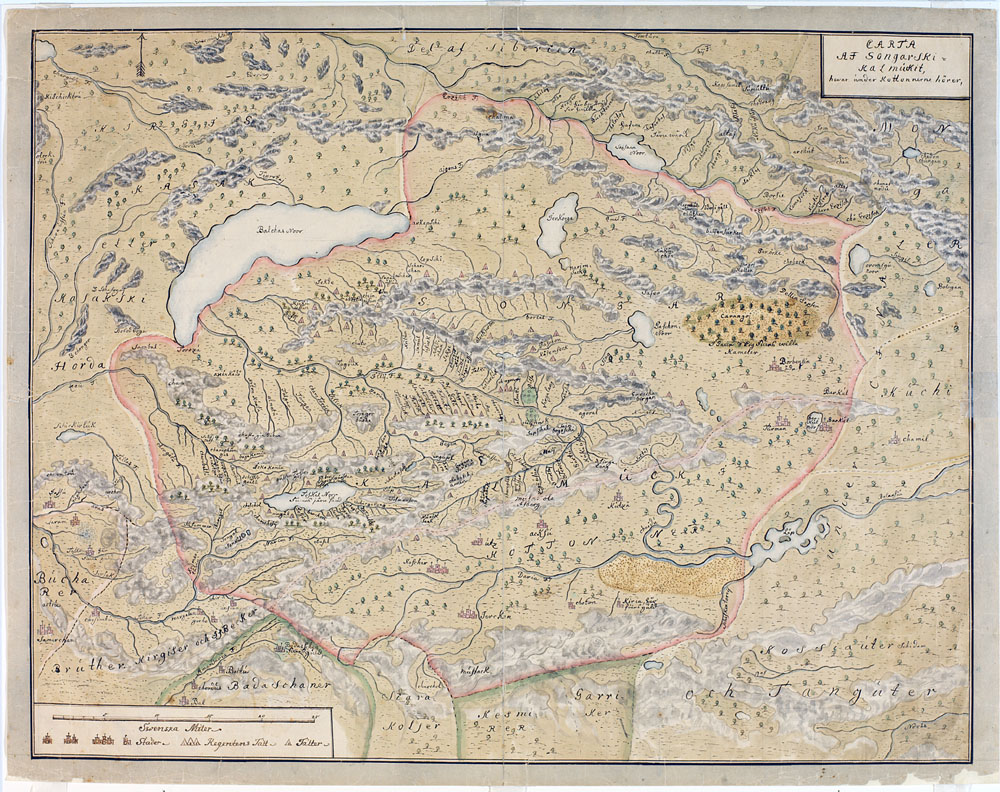
A map of the Dzungar Khanate, by a Johan Gustaf Renat, a Swedish officer held in captivity there in 1716–1733, which include the region known today as Zhetysu

The first people to inhabit the region were Indo-European-speaking peoples such as the Tocharians in prehistory and the Jushi Kingdom in the first millennium BC.

One of the earliest mentions of the Dzungaria region occurs when the Han dynasty dispatched an explorer to investigate lands to the west, using the northernmost Silk Road trackway of about 2,600 kilometres (1,600 mi) in length, which connected the ancient Chinese capital of Xi'an to the west over the Wushao Ling Pass to Wuwei and emerged in Kashgar.

Istämi of the Göktürks received the lands of Dzungaria as an inheritance after the death of his father in the latter half of the sixth century AD.

Dzungar power reached its height in the second half of the 17th century, when Galdan Boshugtu Khan repeatedly intervened in the affairs of the Kazakhs to the west, but it was completely destroyed by the Qing Empire about 1757–1759. It has played an important part in the history of Mongolia and the great migrations of Mongolian stems westward. Its widest limit included Kashgar, Yarkand, Khotan, the whole region of the Tian Shan, and the greater proportion of that part of Central Asia which extends from 35° to 50° N and from 72° to 97° E.

After 1761, its territory fell mostly to the Qing dynasty during the campaign against the Dzungars (Xinjiang and north-western Mongolia) and partly to Russian Turkestan (the earlier Kazakh state provinces of Zhetysu and Irtysh river).

==== Dzungaria and the Silk Road ====
A traveler going west from China must go either north of the Tian Shan mountains through Dzungaria or south of the mountains through the Tarim Basin. Trade usually took the south side and migrations the north. This is most likely because the Tarim leads to the Ferghana Valley and Iran, while Dzungaria leads only to the open steppe. The difficulty with the south side was the high mountains between the Tarim and Ferghana. Furthermore, the Taklamakan is too dry to support much grass, and therefore nomads when they are not robbing caravans. Its inhabitants live mostly in oases formed where rivers run out of the mountains into the desert. These are inhabited by peasants who are unwarlike and merchants who have an interest in keeping trade running smoothly. Dzungaria has a fair amount of grass, few towns to base soldiers in and no significant mountain barriers to the west. Therefore, trade went south and migrations north. Today most trade is north of the mountains (Dzungarian Gate and Khorgas in the Ili valley) to avoid the mountains west of the Tarim and because Russia is currently more developed.

=== Modern era ===
After the Dzungar genocide, the Qing subsequently began to repopulate the area with Han and Hui people from China proper.

The population in the 21st century consists of Kazakhs, Kyrgyz, Mongols, Uyghurs and Han Chinese. Since 1953, northern Xinjiang has attracted skilled workers from all over China—who have mostly been Han Chinese—to work on water conservation and industrial projects, especially the Karamay oil fields. Intraprovincial migration has mostly been directed towards Dzungaria also, with immigrants from the poor Uyghur areas of southern Xinjiang flooding to the provincial capital of Ürümqi to find work.

As a political or geographical term, Dzungaria has practically disappeared from the map; but the range of mountains stretching north-east along the southern frontier of the Zhetysu, as the district to the southeast of Lake Balkhash preserves the name of Dzungarian Alatau. It also gave name to Djungarian hamsters.

== Geography ==
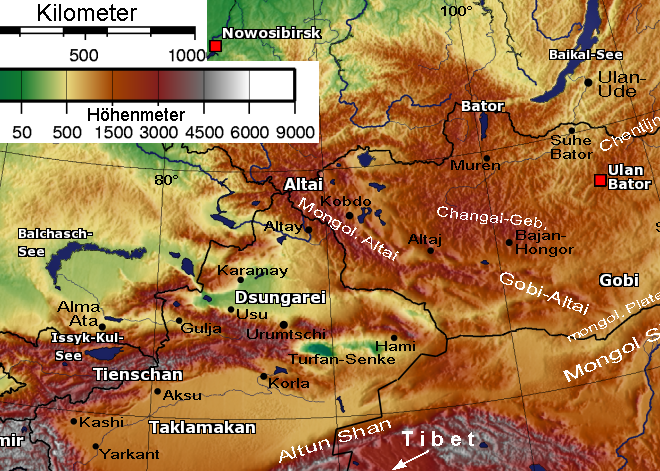
Physical map showing the separation of Dzungaria and the Tarim Basin (Taklamakan) by the Tian Shan Mountains

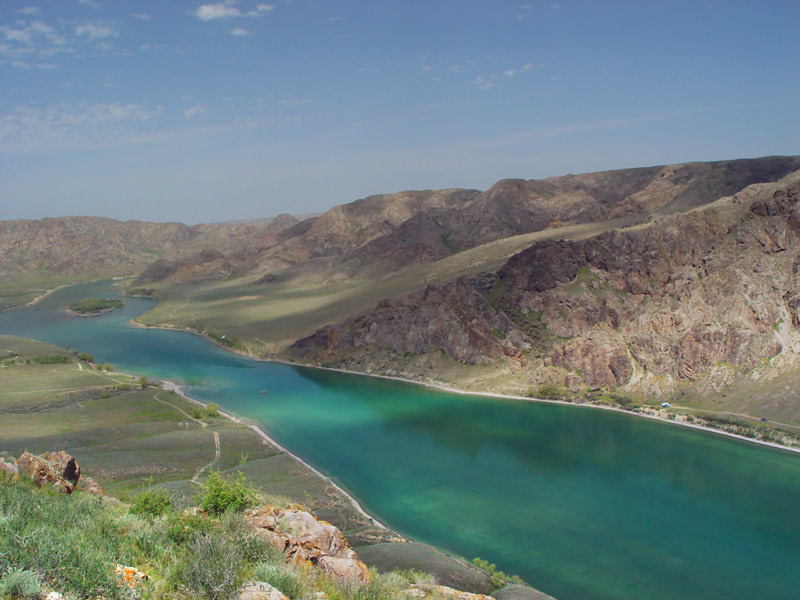
Ili River

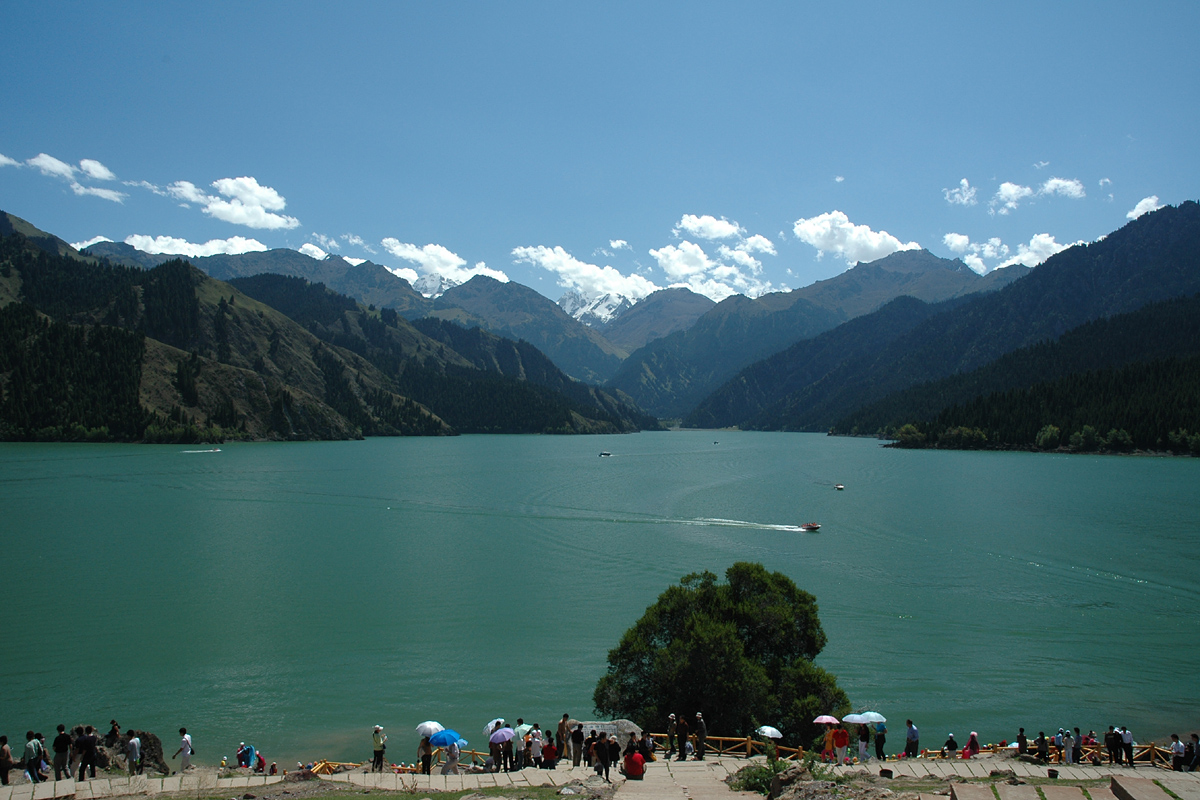
Heaven Lake of Tian Shan

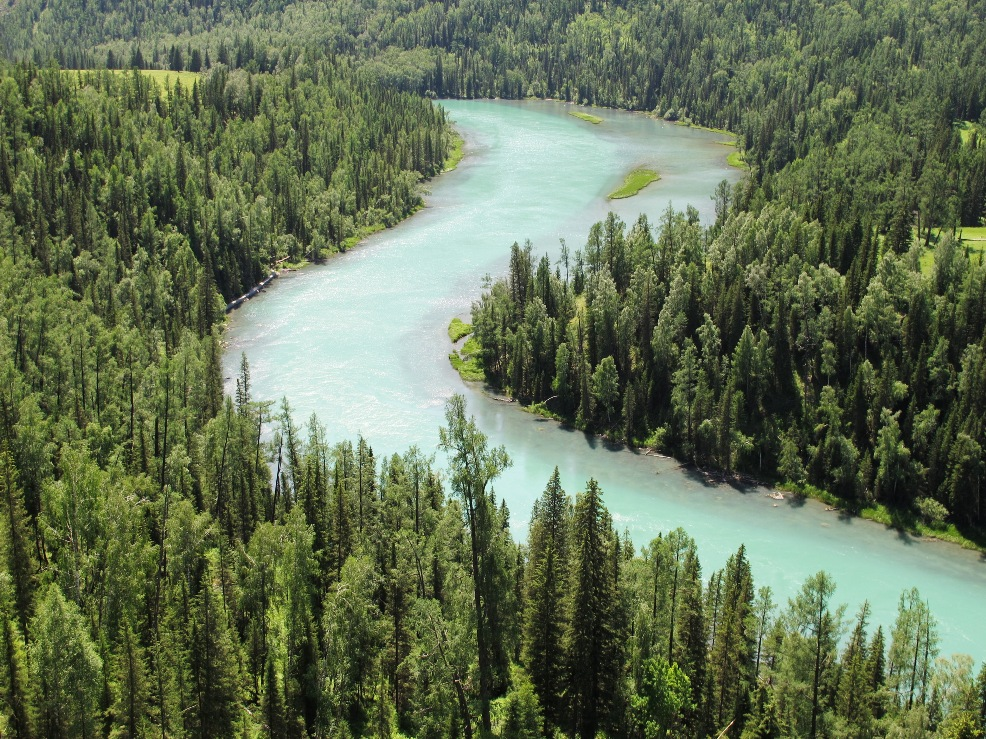
Kanas Lake

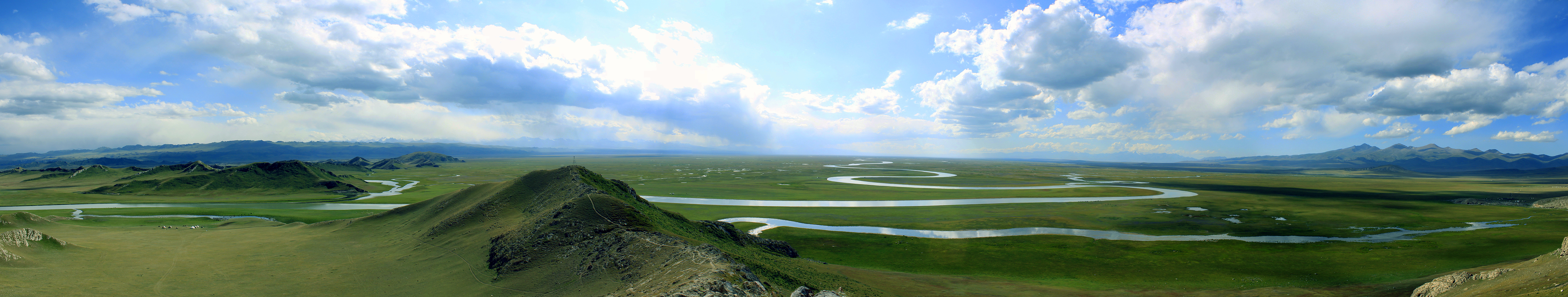
Bayanbulak Grassland

Wheat, barley, oats, and sugar beets are grown, and cattle, sheep, and horses are raised in Dzungaria. The fields are irrigated with melted snow from the permanently white-capped mountains. Dzungaria has deposits of coal, gold, and iron, as well as large oil fields.

=== Dzungarian Basin ===
The core of Dzungaria is the triangular Dzungarian Basin, also known as Junggar Basin (simplified Chinese: 准噶尔盆地; traditional Chinese: 準噶爾盆地; pinyin: Zhǔngá'ěr Péndì), with its central Gurbantünggüt Desert. It is bounded by the Tarbagatai Mountains to the northwest, the Altai Mountains to the northeast, and the Tian Shan mountains to the south. The three corners are relatively open. The northern corner is the valley of the upper Irtysh River. The western corner is the Dzungarian Gate, a historically important gateway between Dzungaria and the Kazakh Steppe; presently, a highway and a railway (opened in 1990) run through it, connecting China with Kazakhstan. The eastern corner of the basin leads to Gansu and the rest of China. In the south, an easy pass leads from Ürümqi to the Turfan Depression. In the southwest, the tall Borohoro Mountains branch of the Tian Shan separates the basin from the upper Ili River.

The basin is similar to the larger Tarim Basin on the southern side of the Tian Shan Range. Only a gap in the mountains to the north allows moist air masses to provide the basin lands with enough moisture to remain semi-desert rather than becoming a true desert like most of the Tarim Basin and allows a thin layer of vegetation to grow. This is enough to sustain populations of wild camels, jerboas, and other wild species.

The Dzungarian Basin is a structural basin with thick sequences of Paleozoic-Pleistocene rocks with large estimated oil reserves. The Gurbantunggut Desert, China's second largest, is in the center of the basin.

The Dzungarian basin does not have a single catchment center. The northernmost section of Dzungaria is part of the basin of the Irtysh River, which ultimately drains into the Arctic Ocean. The rest of the region is split into a number of endorheic basins. In particular, south of the Irtysh, the Ulungur River ends up in the (presently) endorheic Lake Ulungur. The Southwestern part of the Dzungarian basin drains into the Aibi Lake. In the west-central part of the region, streams flow into (or toward) a group of endorheic lakes that include Lake Manas and Lake Ailik. During the region's geological past, a much larger lake (the "Old Manas Lake") was located in the area of today's Manas Lake; it was fed not only by the streams that presently flow toward it but also by the Irtysh and Ulungur, which too were flowing toward the Old Manas Lake at the time.

The cold climate of nearby Siberia influences the climate of the Dzungarian Basin, making the temperature colder—as low as −4 °F (−20 °C)—and providing more precipitation, ranging from 3 to 10 inches (76 to 254 mm), compared to the warmer, drier basins to the south. Runoff from the surrounding mountains into the basin supplies several lakes. The ecologically rich habitats traditionally included meadows, marshlands, and rivers. However, most of the land is now used for agriculture.

It is a largely steppe and semi-desert basin surrounded by high mountains: the Tian Shan (ancient Mount Imeon) in the south and the Altai in the north. Geologically it is an extension of the Paleozoic Kazakhstan Block and was once part of an independent continent before the Altai mountains formed in the late Paleozoic. It does not contain the abundant minerals of Kazakhstan and may have been a pre-existing continental block before the Kazakhstan Block was formed.

Ürümqi, Yining and Karamai are the main cities; other smaller oasis towns dot the piedmont areas.

== Ecology ==
Dzungaria is home to a semi-desert steppe ecoregion known as the Dzungarian Basin semi-desert. The vegetation consists mostly of low scrub of Anabasis brevifolia. Taller shrublands of saxaul bush (Haloxylon ammodendron) and Ephedra przewalskii can be found near the margins of the basin. Streams descending from the Tian Shan and Altai ranges support stands of poplar (Populus diversifolia) together with Nitraria roborovsky, N. sibirica, Neotrinia splendens, tamarisk (Tamarix sibirimosissima), and willow (Salix ledebouriana).

The northeastern portion of the Dzungarian Basin semi-desert lies within Great Gobi National Park, and is home to herds of Onagers (Equus hemionus), goitered gazelles (Gazella subgutturosa) and Wild Bactrian camels (Camelus ferus).

The basin was one of the last habitats of Przewalski's horse (Equus przewalskii), also known as Dzungarian horse, which was once extinct in the wild, though it has since been reintroduced in areas of Mongolia and China.

=== Paleontology ===
Dzungaria and its derivatives are used to name a number of pre-historic animals, hailing from the rocky outcrops located in the Dzungar Basin:

- Dsungaripterus weii (pterosaur)
- Junggarsuchus sloani (crocodylomorph)

A notable find, in February 2006, is the oldest tyrannosaur fossil unearthed by a team of scientists from George Washington University who were conducting a study in the Dzungarian Basin. The species, named Guanlong, lived 160 million years ago, more than 90 million years before the famed Tyrannosaurus rex.

== See also ==
- Shishugou Formation dinosaur traps
- Junggar Basin
- Southern Xinjiang
- Chinese Turkestan
