= Ailik Lake =

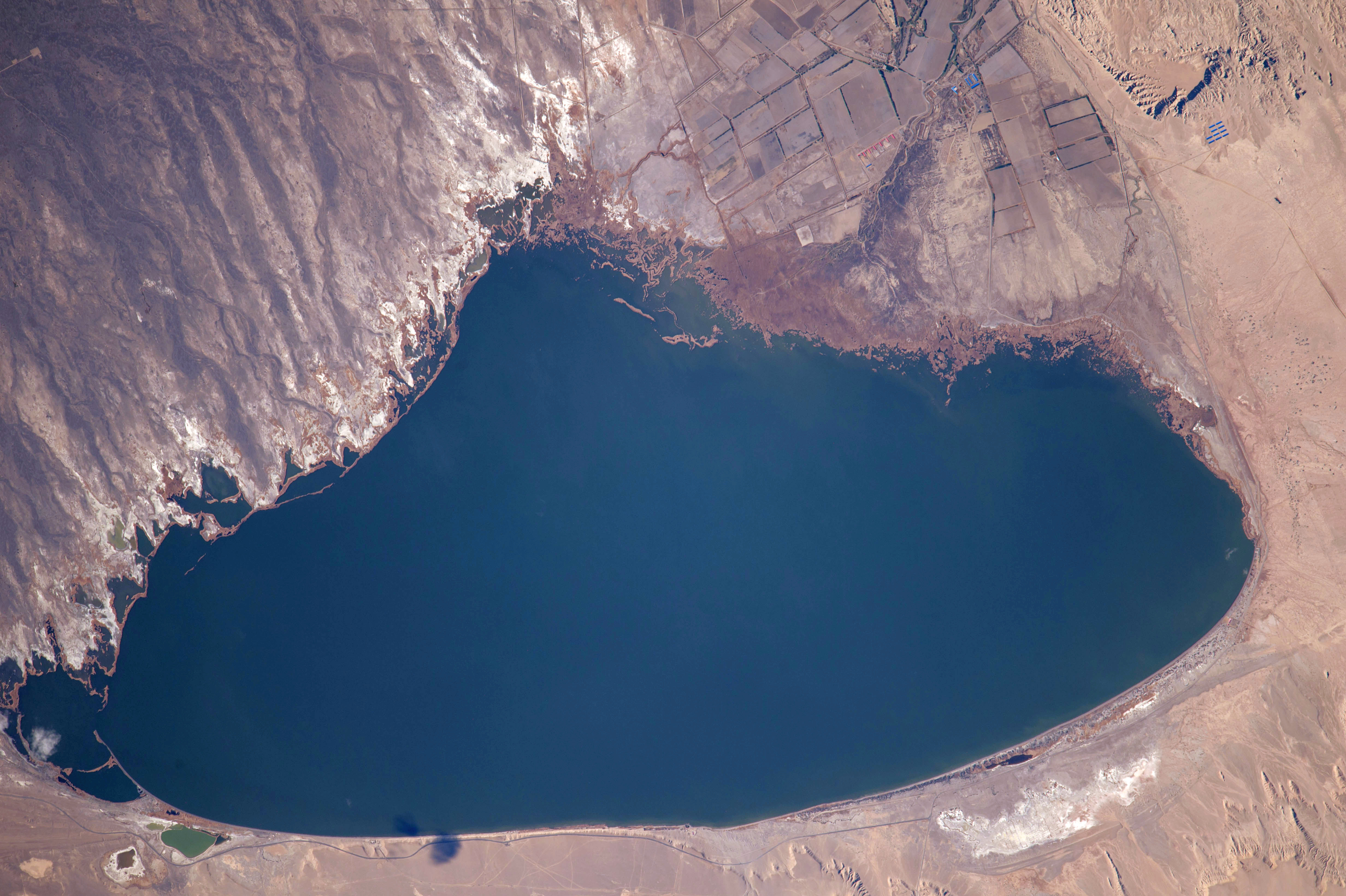
- View of lake taken during ISS Expedition 47

- Location within Dzungaria
- Location: Urho District, Karamay, Xinjiang
- Coordinates: 45°55′00″N 85°47′00″E
- Type: Lake
- Primary inflows: Baiyang River
- Basin countries: China

The Ailik or Aylik Lake (Chinese: 艾里克湖; pinyin: Àilǐkè hú; also transcribed as the [Large] Alike Lake) is a lake in Xinjiang Uighur Autonomous Region, China. It is located in the northwestern part of the Dzungarian Basin, on the edge of the Gurbantünggüt Desert. Administratively, the lake is situated within the Urho District of Karamay City, some 20 km south-east of the district's main urban area.

The Ailik Lake is fed by the Baiyang River, flowing from the Saur Mountains on the Dzungarian Basin's northern rim; the river forms a small delta as it enters the lake (45°58′00″N 85°47′00″E). As of 1999, the lake's water surface elevation was 273 metres (896 ft) to 276 metres (906 ft) above the sea level.

Due to the construction of the Baiyang River Reservoir and the Huangyangquan Reservoir, and the concomitant diversion of the Baiyang River waters for irrigation, aquaculture, and other economic needs, the Ailik Lake started shrinking in the 1980s; by the mid 1980s, it was just 15 km^{2} in size and hardly 1 meter deep; by the 1990s, it had virtually dried up.

The lake was brought back to life by the Irtysh–Karamay Canal. As the canal crosses the Baiyang River at 46°7′45″N 85°25′35″E, a provision has been made for letting about 1/3 of the water flow from the canal into the Baiyang River, (46°7′45″N 85°25′40″E); this improves the water supply situation in Urho District, and allows the river to reach the Ailik Lake again. According to a report published in 2003, since the opening of the canal on August 1, 2000, the Ailik lake, which had been almost dry, has been able to recover as a deep lake with plenty of fish; now it occupies 50 km^{2} and is up to 7 m deep.

An important geological feature is the Ailik Lake area is the Kewu Fault, which runs in the northeast to southwest direction, from the Ailik Lake to the Lesser Ailik Lake (小艾里克湖, a.k.a. the Small Alike Lake, 45°45′35″N 85°34′13″E) and the dry Alan Nur lake (Chinese: 阿雅尔诺尔; pinyin: Āyǎ'ěr Nuò'ěr, or Chinese: 艾兰诺尔; pinyin: Àilán Nuò'ěr; 45°42′00″N 85°23′00″E), which until 1915 was the end point of the Manas River.

Although there is no surface water flow out of the Ailik Lake, some water from this lake is believed to seasonally seep through ground fractures of the Kewu Fault into the Lesser Ailik Lake. Potentially, water can seep through the same fault even farther to the southwest, to the dry Alan Nur lake.
