= Hoxtolgay =

Town in Hoboksar, Xinjiang, China

Hoxtolgay 和什托洛盖镇 قوشتولغاي بازىرى
- Township
- Location in Xinjiang Hoxtolgay (China)
- Coordinates: 46°34′N 85°58′E
- Country: China
- Province: Xinjiang
- Prefecture: Tacheng Prefecture
- County: Hoboksar Mongol Autonomous County

Area
  - Total: 6,684 km^{2} (2,581 sq mi)

Population
  - Total: 22,000

Hoxtolgay or Heshituoluogai (Oirat: χoʃ tolɣæ 'twin peaks', Chinese: 和什托洛盖镇 Héshítuōluògài Zhèn, Uyghur: Хоштолгай) is a town in Hoboksar Mongol Autonomous County, Xinjiang Uygur Autonomous Region, PR China. It is located at 46°34′N 85°58′E, about 200 miles north of Ürümqi in the Dzungaria Basin. Hoxtolgay is an oasis town with an area of 6684 km² and a population of 22,000.

According to the local government, the town's population consists of 8,426 urban residents (i.e., domiciled in the town proper), 4,914 rural residents (i.e., in the rural areas under the town's administration), 4,950 members of the military, and 3,650 floating population (i.e., temporary residents, officially domiciled elsewhere).

Situated in Gurbantünggüt Desert, 30 miles WNW of a point listed as the farthest point from the sea (at 46°16.8′N 86°40.2′E) by the Guinness Book of World Records, Hoxtolgay may qualify as the town most remote from any (sea) coastline, roughly 2646 kilometres from the Arctic Ocean and a similar distance from the Bay of Bengal and the Arabian Sea. (See Continental Pole of Inaccessibility for other candidates).

The area is rich in mineral resources. Besides oil and coal, salt, limestone, quartz sand, and bentonite are also found here. Proven coal reserves are estimated at 30 billion metric tons.

== Transportation ==
Hoxtolgay is served by China National Highway 217 and by Hoxtolgay Station on the Kuytun–Beitun Railway. The Ürümqi West - Beitun City passenger train stops here daily.
