= Nebria saurica =

Scientific classification
- Domain: Eukaryota
- Kingdom: Animalia
- Phylum: Arthropoda
- Class: Insecta
- Order: Coleoptera
- Suborder: Adephaga
- Family: Carabidae
- Subfamily: Nebriinae
- Tribe: Nebriini
- Genus: Nebria
- Species: N. saurica

Binomial name
- Nebria saurica Shilenkov, 1976

Species of beetle

Nebria saurica is a species of ground beetle in the Nebriinae subfamily that is endemic to Kazakhstan. The species can be found in Tarbagatai and Saur Mountains, from which the name have been taken.
