= Streptomyces beijiangensis =

Scientific classification
- Domain: Bacteria
- Kingdom: Bacillati
- Phylum: Actinomycetota
- Class: Actinomycetes
- Order: Streptomycetales
- Family: Streptomycetaceae
- Genus: Streptomyces
- Species: S. beijiangensis

Binomial name
- Streptomyces beijiangensis Li et al. 2002

Type strain
- AS 4.1718, BCRC 16309, CCRC 16309, CCTCC 99005, CIP 107862, DSM 41794, JCM 11882, KCTC 9970, NBRC 100044, YIM6

Species of bacterium

Streptomyces beijiangensis is a psychrotolerant bacterium species from the genus of Streptomyces which has been isolated from soil from Beijiang from the Xinjiang Uyghur Autonomous Region in China.

== See also ==
- List of Streptomyces species
