= Midong, Ürümqi =

Midong: 米东区 (Chinese); مىچۈەن-كۆكتاغ رايونى (Uyghur)
- District
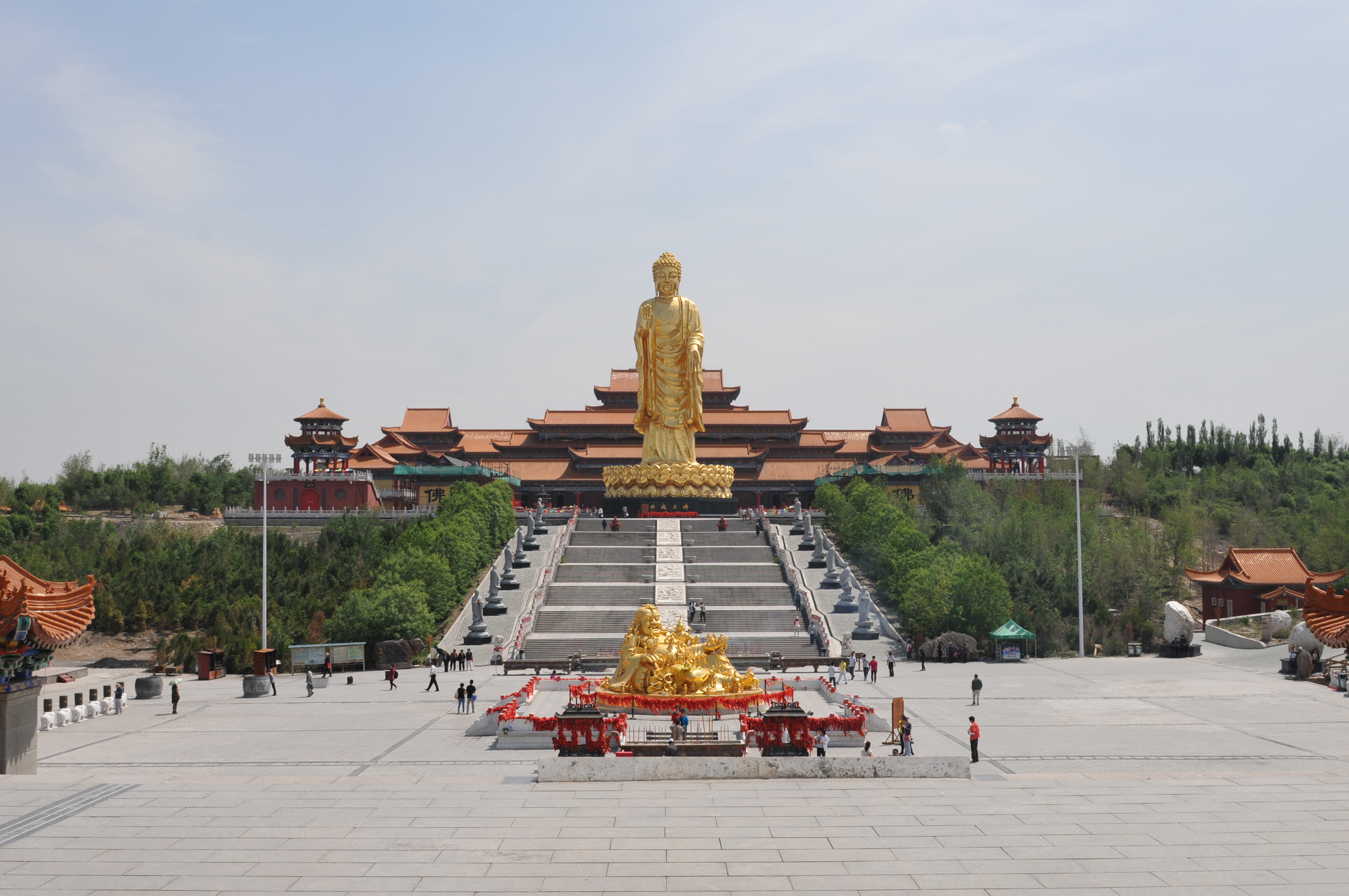
- Buddhist temple in Midong

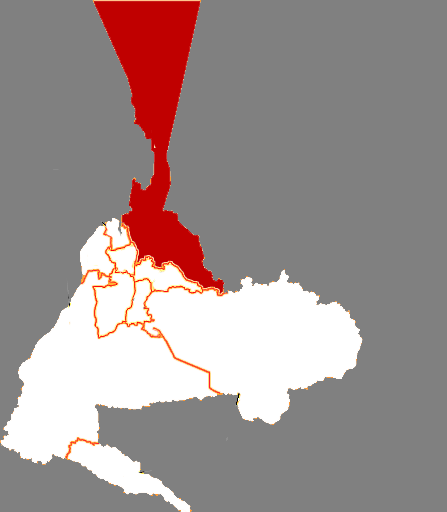
- Midong in Ürümqi

- Location of the seat in Xinjiang Midong (Xinjiang) Midong (China)
- Coordinates: 43°48′N 87°35′E
- Country: China
- Province: Xinjiang
- Prefecture-level city: Ürümqi
- District seat: Gumudi East Road Subdistrict

Area
  - Total: 3,397 km^{2} (1,312 sq mi)

Population (2020)
  - Total: 512,870
  - Density: 151.0/km^{2} (391.0/sq mi)
- Time zone: UTC+8 (China Standard (Note: Locals in Xinjiang frequently observe UTC+6 (Xinjiang Time), 2 hours behind Beijing.))
- Website: www.xjmd.gov.cn

Midong, Ürümqi

Chinese name
- Simplified Chinese: 米东区
- Traditional Chinese: 米東區
Transcriptions
Standard Mandarin
- Hanyu Pinyin: Mǐdōng Qū

Uyghur name
- Uyghur: مىچۈەن-كۆكتاغ رايونى
Transcriptions
- Latin Yëziqi: Michüen-Köktagh Rayoni
- Yengi Yeziⱪ: Miqüen-Kɵktaƣ Rayoni
- Siril Yëziqi: Мичүән-Көктағ Райони

Midong District (Chinese: 米东区; pinyin: Mǐdōng Qū; Uyghur: مىچۈەن-كۆكتاغ رايونى, romanized: Michüen-Köktagh Rayoni, Miqüen-Kɵktaƣ Rayoni, Мичүән-Көктағ Райони) is one of 7 urban districts of the prefecture-level city of Ürümqi, the capital of Xinjiang Uygur Autonomous Region, Northwest China. Its land area is 3,408 km^{2} (1,316 sq mi); it has a population of 296,000.

== History ==
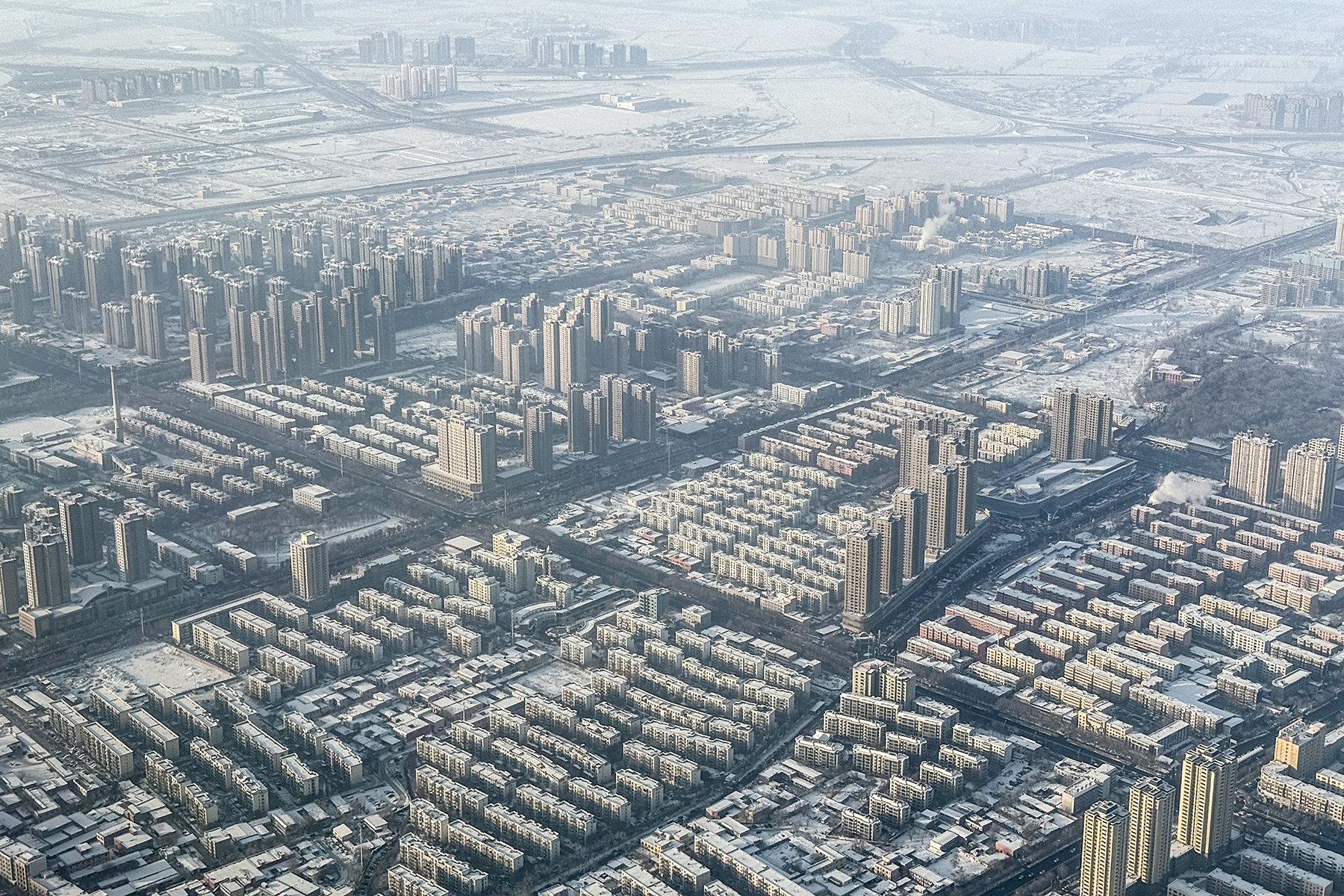
Aerial view of Midong District, Urumqi

Midong District was formed in 2007 by merging the former "Dongshan District" (Chinese: 东山区; pinyin: Dōngshān Qū; Uyghur: دۇڭسەن رايونى, romanized: Dungsen Rayoni, Dungsən Rayoni, Дуңсән Раүони) of Ürümqi (244 km^{2} or 94 sq mi, population of 100,000, as per the 2002 Census) with the "Miquan City" (Chinese: 米泉市; pinyin: Mǐquán Shì; Uyghur: مىچۈەن شەھىرى, romanized: Michüen shehiri; formerly part of Changji Hui Autonomous Prefecture).

== Geography ==
Midong District includes northern and eastern suburbs of Ürümqi, as well as a large slice of the Gurbantünggüt Desert north of the city which is administratively included into Ürümqi.

The natural water sources in the Ürümqi area mostly consist of streams that flow from the snow-capped Tian Shan mountains south of the city. Since Midong District is located northmost and therefore downstream, of the main urban area, the water supply problems there are particularly acute. To enable the area's economic development, the Irtysh–Ürümqi Canal was brought to Midong during the first decade of the 20th century. Its main terminal is the so-called "Reservoir 500", constructed at the border of Midong District and Fukang County-level City (44°12′00″N 87°49′00″E).

== Administrative divisions ==
Midong District contains 7 subdistricts, 5 towns, 1 township and 1 ethnic township:

| Name | Simplified Chinese | Hanyu Pinyin | Uyghur (UEY) | Uyghur Latin (ULY) | Administrative division code |
|---|---|---|---|---|---|
Subdistricts
| Petrochemical Subdistrict | 石化街道 | Shíhuà Jiēdào | نېفىت خىمىيە سانائىتى كوچا باشقارمىسى | Nëfit ximiye sana'iti kocha bashqarmisi | 650109001 |
| Dibang Subdistrict | 地磅街道 | Dìbàng Jiēdào | دىباڭ كوچا باشقارمىسى | Dibang kocha bashqarmisi | 650109002 |
| Qiaziwan Subdistrict | 卡子湾街道 | Qiǎzǐwān Jiēdào | چازىۋەن كوچا باشقارمىسى | Chaziwen kocha bashqarmisi | 650109003 |
| Gumudi East Road Subdistrict | 古牧地东路街道 | Gǔmùdìdōnglù Jiēdào | گۇمۇدى شەرقىي يولى كوچا باشقارمىسى | Gumudi sherqiy yoli kocha bashqarmisi | 650109004 |
| Gumudi West Road Subdistrict | 古牧地西路街道 | Gǔmùdìxīlù Jiēdào | گۇمۇدى غەربىي يولى كوچا باشقارمىسى | Gumudi gherbiy yoli kocha bashqarmisi | 650109005 |
| South Road Subdistrict | 南路街道 | Nánlù Jiēdào | جەنۇبىي مىچۈەن-كۆكتاغ يولى كوچا باشقارمىسى | Jenubiy michüen-köktagh yoli kocha bashqarmisi | 650109006 |
| Yongxiang Street Subdistrict | 永祥街街道 | Yǒngxiángjiē Jiēdào | يۇڭشياڭ كوچىسى كوچا باشقارمىسى | Yungshyang kochisi kocha bashqarmisi | 650109007 |
| Shengda East Road Subdistrict | 永祥街街道 | Yǒngxiángjiē Jiēdào | شېڭدا شەرقىي يولى كوچا باشقارمىسى | Shëngda sherqiy yoli kocha bashqarmisi | 650109008 |
Towns
| Gumudi Town | 古牧地镇 | Gǔmùdì Zhèn | گۇمۇدى بازىرى | Gumudi baziri | 650109100 |
| Tiechanggou Town | 铁厂沟镇 | Tiěchǎnggōu Zhèn | تيېچاڭگۇ بازىرى | Tyëchanggu baziri | 650109101 |
| Changshanzi Town | 长山子镇 | Chángshānzǐ Zhèn | چاڭشەنزى بازىرى | Changshenzi baziri | 650109102 |
| Yangmaogong Town | 羊毛工镇 | Yángmáogōng Zhèn | ياڭماۋگۇڭ بازىرى | Yangmawgung baziri | 650109103 |
| Sandaoba Town | 三道坝镇 | Sāndàobà Zhèn | سەنداۋبا بازىرى | Sendawba baziri | 650109104 |
Township
| Lucaogou Township | 芦草沟乡 | Lúcǎogōu Xiāng | لۇساۋگۇ يېزىسى | Lusawgu yëzisi | 650109201 |
Ethnic township
| Baiyanghe Kazakh Ethnic Township | 柏杨河哈萨克族乡 | Bǎiyánghé Hāsàkèzú Xiāng | بەيياڭخې قازاق يېزىسى | Beyyangxë qazaq yëzisi | 650109200 |

== Climate ==
Climate data for Midong District, elevation 600 m (2,000 ft), (1991–2020 normals, extremes 1981–present)
| Month | Jan | Feb | Mar | Apr | May | Jun | Jul | Aug | Sep | Oct | Nov | Dec | Year |
|---|---|---|---|---|---|---|---|---|---|---|---|---|---|
| Record high °C (°F) | 10.3 (50.5) | 6.9 (44.4) | 24.8 (76.6) | 34.4 (93.9) | 37.9 (100.2) | 40.9 (105.6) | 43.7 (110.7) | 42.9 (109.2) | 39.0 (102.2) | 31.7 (89.1) | 19.5 (67.1) | 14.8 (58.6) | 43.7 (110.7) |
| Mean daily maximum °C (°F) | −9.9 (14.2) | −5.5 (22.1) | 6.3 (43.3) | 20.0 (68.0) | 26.3 (79.3) | 31.2 (88.2) | 32.9 (91.2) | 31.8 (89.2) | 25.9 (78.6) | 16.2 (61.2) | 3.6 (38.5) | −6.9 (19.6) | 14.3 (57.8) |
| Daily mean °C (°F) | −13.7 (7.3) | −9.4 (15.1) | 1.6 (34.9) | 13.4 (56.1) | 19.5 (67.1) | 24.7 (76.5) | 26.5 (79.7) | 24.9 (76.8) | 18.9 (66.0) | 10.0 (50.0) | −0.4 (31.3) | −10.3 (13.5) | 8.8 (47.9) |
| Mean daily minimum °C (°F) | −16.5 (2.3) | −12.4 (9.7) | −2.1 (28.2) | 8.1 (46.6) | 13.8 (56.8) | 19.3 (66.7) | 21.3 (70.3) | 19.6 (67.3) | 13.6 (56.5) | 5.7 (42.3) | −3.2 (26.2) | −12.9 (8.8) | 4.5 (40.1) |
| Record low °C (°F) | −28.4 (−19.1) | −27.9 (−18.2) | −23.4 (−10.1) | −7.2 (19.0) | 0.0 (32.0) | 7.5 (45.5) | 11.6 (52.9) | 7.5 (45.5) | 1.0 (33.8) | −8.0 (17.6) | −26.7 (−16.1) | −29.7 (−21.5) | −29.7 (−21.5) |
| Average precipitation mm (inches) | 8.8 (0.35) | 10.2 (0.40) | 15.2 (0.60) | 29.9 (1.18) | 33.9 (1.33) | 20.7 (0.81) | 30.1 (1.19) | 26.2 (1.03) | 16.6 (0.65) | 21.1 (0.83) | 18.3 (0.72) | 15.3 (0.60) | 246.3 (9.69) |
| Average precipitation days (≥ 0.1 mm) | 8.4 | 7.0 | 4.5 | 6.2 | 6.3 | 6.8 | 7.1 | 5.9 | 4.1 | 4.7 | 6.1 | 9.0 | 76.1 |
| Average snowy days | 18.7 | 14.1 | 5.9 | 1.7 | 0 | 0 | 0 | 0 | 0 | 1.1 | 7.9 | 17.4 | 66.8 |
| Average relative humidity (%) | 81 | 79 | 69 | 45 | 40 | 40 | 42 | 41 | 43 | 56 | 75 | 82 | 58 |
| Mean monthly sunshine hours | 64.2 | 104.5 | 208.4 | 269.4 | 309.8 | 309.4 | 311.0 | 310.2 | 278.7 | 231.6 | 112.9 | 50.7 | 2,560.8 |
| Percentage possible sunshine | 22 | 35 | 55 | 66 | 67 | 67 | 67 | 73 | 76 | 70 | 40 | 19 | 55 |
Source: China Meteorological Administration all-time August high
