= Streptomyces desertarenae =

Scientific classification
- Domain: Bacteria
- Kingdom: Bacillati
- Phylum: Actinomycetota
- Class: Actinomycetia
- Order: Streptomycetales
- Family: Streptomycetaceae
- Genus: Streptomyces
- Species: S. desertarenae

Binomial name
- Streptomyces desertarenae Li et al. 2019

Type strain
- SYSU D8023

Species of bacterium

Streptomyces desertarenae is a Gram-positive and aerobic bacterium species from the genus of Streptomyces which has been isolated from sand from the Gurbantünggüt Desert in China.

== See also ==
- List of Streptomyces species
