= Brachypareion =

Brachypareion Temporal range: Pennsylvanian

Scientific classification
- Kingdom: Animalia
- Phylum: Chordata
- Class: Actinopterygii
- Order: †Palaeonisciformes (?)
- Family: †Gonatodidae
- Genus: †Brachypareion; Kazantseva-Selezneva 1980
- Species: †B. insperatum

Binomial name
- †Brachypareion insperatum Kazantseva-Selezneva, 1980

Extinct genus of fishes

Brachypareion is an extinct genus of prehistoric marine ray-finned fish that lived during the Pennsylvanian epoch. It contains a single species, B. insperatum, known from the Akansaiskaya Formation in the Saur Mountains of Kazakhstan. It is placed in the paraphyletic group Palaeonisciformes, within the potentially paraphyletic family Gonatodidae.

== See also ==
- Prehistoric fish
- List of prehistoric bony fish
