= Baiyang River =

River in Xinjiang region of China

The Baiyang River (Chinese: 白杨河; pinyin: Báiyáng hé; lit. 'White Poplar River'), also known under a Mongolian name transcribed in Chinese as Namuguolei (Chinese: 纳木郭勒河; pinyin: Nàmùguōlēi hé), is a river in Xinjiang Uighur Autonomous Region of China. It flows through the region's Tacheng Prefecture and the Urho District of Karamay City. The river's total length is estimated at 170 kilometres (110 mi), and the average annual flow at 109 million cubic metres (88,000 acre⋅ft). The river's basin occupies 16,400 square kilometres (6,300 sq mi),

The Baiyang River starts in a massif near the junction of the Tarbagatai and Saur mountain ranges, near Xinjiang's border with Kazakhstan. It flows in a general southeastern direction, toward the endorheic Dzungarian Basin. Along much of its length it forms the border between Hoboksar Mongol Autonomous County in the east and Emin and Toli Counties in the west. It crosses Urho District of Karamay City, and then re-enters Hoboksar County.

The Baiyang River is dammed at 46°08′35″N 85°22′35″E； the dam creates the Baiyang River Reservoir (白杨河水库) with an area of 5.8 square kilometres (2.2 sq mi).

The Irtysh–Karamay Canal crosses the Baiyang River on an aqueduct at 46°7′45″N 85°25′35″E, upstream of Urho District's main urban area. A provision has been made for letting about 1/3 of the water flow from the canal into the Baiyang River, (46°7′45″N 85°25′40″E), thus improving the water supply situation in Urho District and a revitalizing the riverside wetlands. The Baiyang River canyon in the western part of Urho District is considered a scenic site.

The river enters the Gurbantünggüt Desert and ends in the endorheic Ailik Lake. The river forms a small delta as it enters the lake (45°58′00″N 85°47′00″E). As of 1999, the lake's water surface elevation was 273 to 276 metres (896 to 906 ft) above sea level.

Due to the construction of the Baiyang River Reservoir and the Huangyangquan Reservoir (see below) and the concomitant diversion of the Baiyang River waters, the Ailik Lake started shrinking in the 1980s; by the mid 1980s, it was just 15 square kilometres (5.8 sq mi) in size and hardly 1 metre (3 ft) deep; by the 1990s, it had virtually dried up. Since the opening of the Irtysh–Karamay Canal in August 2000, the Ailik lake, which had been almost dry, has been able to recover as a deep lake with plenty of fish; now it occupies 50 square kilometres (19 sq mi) and is up to 7 metres (23 ft) deep.

While there is no further surface water flow out of the Ailik Lake, some water from this lake is believed to seasonally seep through ground fractures of the Kewu Fault into the nearby Small Ailik Lake (小艾里克湖, 45°45′35″N 85°34′13″E), whose water surface is (as of 1999) at about 270 metres (890 ft) above sea level. Potentially, water can seep through the same fault even farther to the southwest, to the dry Alan Nur lake (the former terminus of the Manas River).

== A distributary canal ==
For over 20 kilometres (12 mi) downstream from the Baiyang River Reservoir to the Ailik Lake, the natural river bed of the Baiyang River is paralleled by an artificial, concrete-lined canal, which leaves the reservoir at 46°8′18″N 85°22′20″E, crosses the Irtysh–Karamay Canal at 46°07′10″N 85°25′00″E, passes through the Huangyangquan Reservoir (黄羊泉水库, dam at 46°03′53″N 85°34′49″E), and ends in what appears to be an aquaculture facility at 46°02′00″N 85°36′00″E.

== Other uses ==
Numerous watercourses in Central Asia (including Kazakhstan and Xinjiang) carry names meaning "Poplar River" in Chinese or in a Turkic language. This includes the Baiyang River of Toksun County, which flows from the main Tian Shan range toward Lake Aydingkol, as well as several Terekty Rivers in Kazakhstan or Kazakh-speaking sections of Xinjiang.
