= Ulungur River =

River in China and Mongolia

Chinese name
- Simplified Chinese: 乌伦古河
Transcriptions
Standard Mandarin
- Hanyu Pinyin: Wūlúngǔ hé

Mongolian name
- Mongolian Cyrillic: Өрөнгө гол
Transcriptions
- SASM/GNC: Öröngö Gol

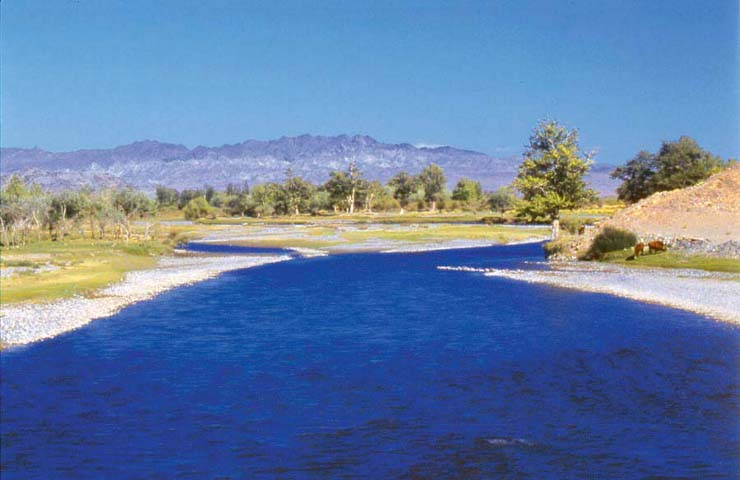
The Bulgan River

The Ulungur River / Urungu River or Urungu (Mongolian: Өрөнгө гол, romanized: Öröngö Gol, Chinese: 乌伦古河; pinyin: Wūlúngǔ hé), in its upper reaches in Mongolia known as the Bulgan River (Mongolian: Булган гол), is a river of China and Mongolia. It rises in the Altai Mountains in western Mongolia, flows south into China's Xinjiang (Altay Prefecture), where it turns north-west to empty into the Ulungur Lake. It is about 700 km long.

The Irtysh–Karamay Canal crosses the Ulungur River at 46°36′15″N 87°56′52″E, on an aqueduct.

== Geological history ==
In the early Quaternary, the Ulungur (as well as the upper Irtysh) flowed into the Dzungarian Basin, terminating in a large lake (the "Old Manas Lake") in the region of today's Lake Manas. Later tectonic movements redirected the Ulungur onto its current course.

== Wildlife ==
The Sino-Mongolian beaver, Castor fiber birulai, is found only in the basin of the Ulungur River. The population is considered endangered. The Bulgan Beaver Nature Reserve (Chinese: 布尔根河河狸自然保护区; 46°12′00″N 90°45′00″E) has been established on the Bulgan River (a tributary of the Ulungur River) in Qinggil (Qinghe) County in 1980 to protect the creatures.

== Links ==
- The river Bulgan Gol
