= Fengcheng Reservoir =

Reservoir in Xinjiang, China

Coordinates: 46°13′00″N 85°38′00″E

The Fengcheng Reservoir (Chinese: 风城水库; pinyin: Fēngchéng shuǐkù) is a reservoir on the Irtysh–Karamay Canal in China's Xinjiang Uighur Autonomous Region. It is about 15 km north of the main urban area of Urho District of Karamay City; administratively, the location is near the border of Urho District and Hoboksar Mongol Autonomous County.

Located in the "tail" part of the Irtysh-Karamay Canal, the main function of the reservoir is to control the water flow along the canal. Its volume can vary from the minimum of 8 million m^{3} to the maximum of 100 million m^{3}; at the highest water level, the reservoir area is 6.2 km^{2}. The lowest water level is 445 m above the sea level.

The reservoir sits in a natural depression, surrounded by dams in most directions. It was constructed in 1998–2000.
