= Sauyr Zhotasy =

Mountain in the Tien Shan on the Kazakh-Chinese border

- Location within Dzungaria Location within Kazakhstan

Highest point
- Elevation: 3,840 m (12,600 ft)
- Prominence: 3,252 m (10,669 ft); Ranked 68th
- Listing: Ultra
- Coordinates: 47°02′57″N 85°34′00″E

Geography
- Location: China–Kazakhstan border
- Parent range: Saur, Tien Shan

Climbing
- First ascent: Unclimbed

Sauyr Zhotasy (Kazakh: Сауыр жотасы, Sauyr jotasy), also known as Muz Tau (Chinese: 木斯岛山; pinyin: Mùsīdǎo Shān), is a 3,840 m mountain on the border between Kazakhstan and China. It is the tallest mountain in both the Saur Range and Saur-Tarbagatai mountain system (part of the Tien Shan), and the most topographically prominent unclimbed mountain in the world.

Despite its low elevation, it is well separated from higher ranges in its area (the Saur-Tarbagatai System being separated from the Altai Mountains by the Irtysh River valley, and from the Dzungarian Alatau, by the Dzungarian Gate); it is therefore ranked highly by topographic prominence.

There have been two documented ascents to sub-summits of Sauyr Zhotasy, occurring in 2017 and 2018 by Ed Hannam and his team, but no official ascents to the main summit have been recorded.

It lies 100 kilometres (60 mi) southeast of Zaysan Lake.

== See also ==
- List of ultras of Central Asia
