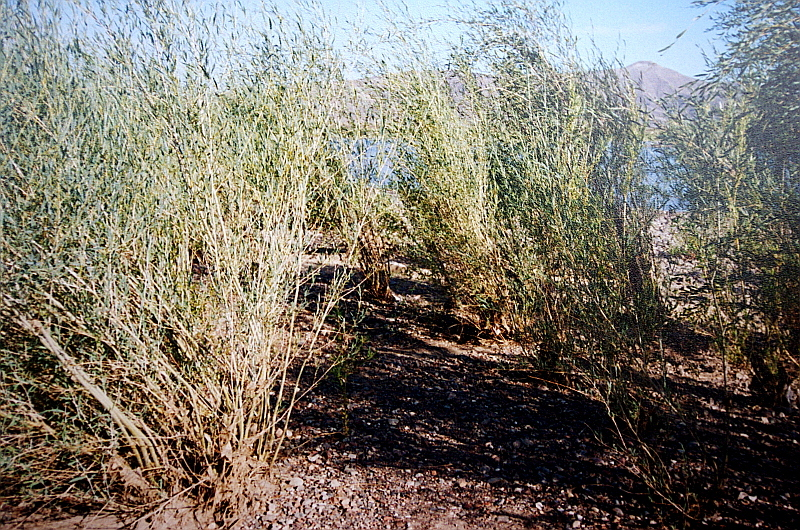

Scientific classification
- Kingdom: Plantae
- Clade: Tracheophytes
- Clade: Angiosperms
- Clade: Eudicots
- Clade: Rosids
- Order: Malpighiales
- Family: Salicaceae
- Genus: Salix
- Species: S. ledebouriana

Binomial name
- Salix ledebouriana Trautv.

Synonyms
- Salix pallida Ledeb.

= Salix ledebouriana =

Species of willow

Salix ledebouriana is a species of willow. It is found from the southern West Siberian Plain, across Kazakhstan to Mongolia.

It grows as a shrub in the temperate grasslands, savannas, and shrublands biome.
