= Bulgan Gol-Ikh Ongog National Park =

National park in Khovd, Mongolia

- Mongolian: Булган Гол
- IUCN category II (national park)
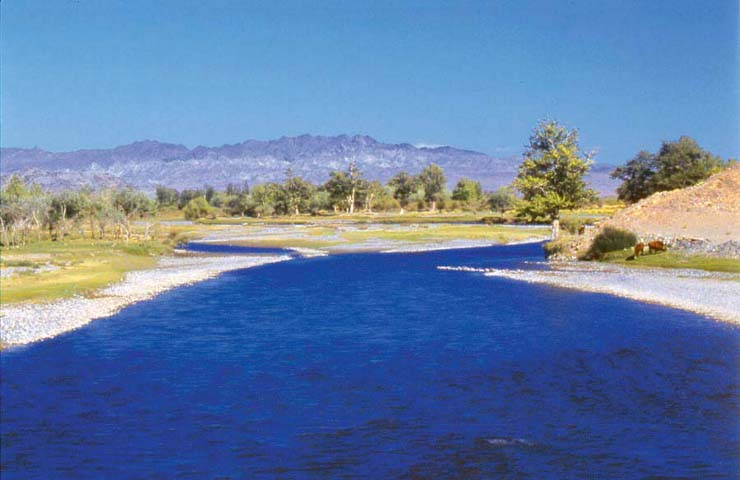
- Bulgan River

- Location within Mongolia
- Location: Khovd, Mongolia
- Coordinates: 46.1°N 91.16°E
- Area: 2,461 square kilometres (950 sq mi)
- Established: 2011; 15 years ago
- Governing body: Ministry of Environment and Green Development of Mongolia

Bulgan Gol-Ikh Ongog National Park (Mongolian: Булган Гол) is a national park in Khovd Province, Mongolia which is centered on the Bulgan River, which divides into many meandering streams, lakes, and wetlands as if flow through the valley in the park. The area is an important stopover for migratory birds. Species in the park include the vulnerable eastern imperial eagle, and the lesser kestrel.

== Topography ==
The Bulgan River originates in the Altai Mountains of western Mongolia, and flows westward into Ulungur Lake in China. The Bulgan River Valley is relatively broad and flat, permitting the meandering river to divide in many places to produce islands and riparian wetlands.

== Climate and ecoregion ==
The climate of the area is cold semi-arid climate (Köppen climate classification (BSk)). This climate is characteristic of steppe climates intermediary between desert humid climates, and typically have precipitation is above evapotranspiration. At least one month averages below 0 °C (32 °F).

== Flora and fauna ==
Vegetation in the Bulgan River Valley is desert steppe. The wetlands along the banks support reed beds and shrubs. The area is important for migratory birds, and is used by notable species that include the vulnerable swan goose (Anser cygnoides), the vulnerable eastern imperial eagle (Aquila heliaca) and the lesser kestrel (Falco naumanni). The site also supports the Eurasian beaver (Castor fiber).

== See also ==
- List of national parks of Mongolia
