= Manas County =

Manas County 玛纳斯县 (Chinese) ماناس ناھىيىسى (Uyghur) Manass
- County
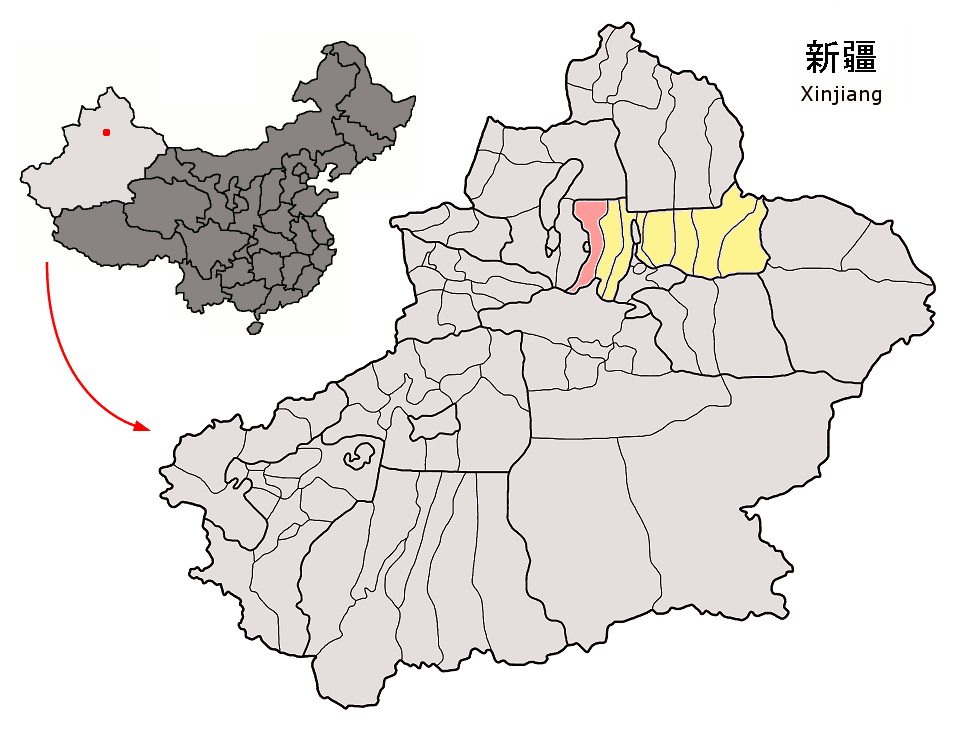
- Location of Manas County (pink) in Changji Prefecture (yellow) and Xinjiang (grey)

- Location in Xinjiang Manas (China)
- Coordinates: 44°18′N 86°13′E
- Country: China
- Autonomous region: Xinjiang
- Prefecture: Changji
- County seat: Manas Town

Area
  - Total: 9,171 km^{2} (3,541 sq mi)

Population (2020)
  - Total: 192,098
  - Density: 20.95/km^{2} (54.25/sq mi)
- Time zone: UTC+8 (China Standard (Note: Locals in Xinjiang frequently observe UTC+6 (Xinjiang Time), 2 hours behind Beijing.))
- Website: www.mns.gov.cn

Manas County

Chinese name
- Simplified Chinese: 玛纳斯县
- Traditional Chinese: 瑪納斯縣
Transcriptions
Standard Mandarin
- Hanyu Pinyin: Mǎnàsī Xiàn
- Wade–Giles: Ma-na-szŭ Hsien
other Mandarin
- Xiao'erjing: مَانَاسِ ثِیًا

Alternative Chinese name
- Simplified Chinese: 绥来县
- Traditional Chinese: 綏來縣
Transcriptions
Standard Mandarin
- Hanyu Pinyin: Suīlái Xiàn

Uyghur name
- Uyghur: ماناس ناھىيىسى
Transcriptions
- Latin Yëziqi: Manas nahiyisi
- Yengi Yeziⱪ: Manas naⱨiyisi
- SASM/GNC: Manas Nahiyisi
- Siril Yëziqi: Манас наһийиси

Manas County is a county in the Xinjiang Uyghur Autonomous Region under the administration of the Changji Hui Autonomous Prefecture. It covers an area of 9,174 square kilometres (3,542 sq mi) and as of the 2002 census it had a population of 170,000.

The county seat is the old town of Manas, located on the Manas River just east of Shihezi.

Manass has been called: "the biggest city (after Urumchi) in the biggest oasis on the biggest river of the North Road, and the chief centre of the T'ung-kan (Т′уң-кан, Dungan) population."

== Subdivisions ==
Manas County is made up of 7 towns, 1 township, and 3 ethnic townships.

Name	Simplified Chinese	Hanyu Pinyin	Uyghur (UEY)	Uyghur Latin (ULY)	Administrative division code	Notes
Towns
Manas Town	玛纳斯镇	Mǎnàsī Zhèn	ماناس بازىرى	manas baziri	652324100	
Letuyi Town	乐土驿镇	Lètǔyì Zhèn	لوتۇيى بازىرى	lotuyi baziri	652324101	
Baojiadian Town	包家店镇	Bāojiādiàn Zhèn	باۋجيادەن بازىرى	bawjyaden baziri	652324102	
Liangzhouhu Town	凉州户镇	Liángzhōuhù Zhèn	لياڭجۇخۇ بازىرى	lyangjuxu baziri	652324103	
Beiwucha Town	北五岔镇	Běiwǔchà Zhèn	بېيۋۇچا بازىرى	bëywucha baziri	652324104	
Liuhudi Town	六户地镇	Liùhùdì Zhèn	ليۇخۇدى بازىرى	lyuxudi baziri	652324105	
Lanzhouwan Town	兰州湾镇	Lánzhōuwān Zhèn	لەنجۇۋەن بازىرى	lenjuwen baziri	652324106	
Township
Guangdongdi Township	广东地乡	Guǎngdōngdì Xiāng	گۇاڭدۇڭدى يېزىسى	guangdungdi yëzisi	652324201	
Ethnic townships
Qingshuihezi Kazakh Ethnic Township	清水河子哈萨克民族乡	Qīngshuǐhézǐ Hāsàkè Mínzúxiāng	چىندىخوزا قازاق يېزىسى	chindixoza qazaq yëzisi	652324202	(Kazakh) شىندىقوزى قازاق اۋىلى
Taxihe Kazakh Ethnic Township	塔西河乡 (塔西河哈萨克民族乡)	Tǎxīhé Xiāng (Tǎxīhé Hāsàkè Mínzúxiāng)	تاسىرقاي قازاق يېزىسى	tasirqay qazaq yëzisi	652324203	(Kazakh) تاسىرقاي قازاق اۋىلى
Hanqiazitan Kazakh Ethnic Township	旱卡子滩乡 (旱卡子滩哈萨克民族乡)	Hànqiǎzǐtān Xiāng (Hànqiǎzǐtān Hāsàkè Mínzúxiāng)	سۇساتقان قازاق يېزىسى	susatqan qazaq yëzisi	652324204	(Kazakh) سۋساتقان قازاق اۋىلى

== Climate ==
Climate data for Manas, elevation 471 m (1,545 ft), (1991–2020 normals, extremes 1981–2010)
Month	Jan	Feb	Mar	Apr	May	Jun	Jul	Aug	Sep	Oct	Nov	Dec	Year
Record high °C (°F)	5.8 (42.4)	5.9 (42.6)	23.6 (74.5)	34.8 (94.6)	38.4 (101.1)	40.0 (104.0)	42.0 (107.6)	41.1 (106.0)	39.4 (102.9)	33.2 (91.8)	18.4 (65.1)	8.5 (47.3)	42.0 (107.6)
Mean daily maximum °C (°F)	−10.6 (12.9)	−5.7 (21.7)	6.2 (43.2)	20.4 (68.7)	26.5 (79.7)	31.2 (88.2)	32.4 (90.3)	31.1 (88.0)	25.4 (77.7)	16.2 (61.2)	3.8 (38.8)	−7.3 (18.9)	14.1 (57.4)
Daily mean °C (°F)	−16.4 (2.5)	−11.2 (11.8)	0.9 (33.6)	13.0 (55.4)	19.2 (66.6)	24.2 (75.6)	25.3 (77.5)	23.2 (73.8)	16.9 (62.4)	8.5 (47.3)	−1.3 (29.7)	−12.1 (10.2)	7.5 (45.5)
Mean daily minimum °C (°F)	−21.5 (−6.7)	−16.4 (2.5)	−4.1 (24.6)	6.3 (43.3)	12.0 (53.6)	17.1 (62.8)	18.5 (65.3)	16.3 (61.3)	10.0 (50.0)	2.9 (37.2)	−5.4 (22.3)	−16.4 (2.5)	1.6 (34.9)
Record low °C (°F)	−35.7 (−32.3)	−37.7 (−35.9)	−31.5 (−24.7)	−8.2 (17.2)	−1.8 (28.8)	5.0 (41.0)	10.0 (50.0)	4.4 (39.9)	−4.1 (24.6)	−8.8 (16.2)	−29.4 (−20.9)	−37.4 (−35.3)	−37.7 (−35.9)
Average precipitation mm (inches)	8.0 (0.31)	9.4 (0.37)	13.1 (0.52)	28.1 (1.11)	29.2 (1.15)	21.1 (0.83)	24.4 (0.96)	20.5 (0.81)	14.0 (0.55)	16.9 (0.67)	17.6 (0.69)	12.5 (0.49)	214.8 (8.46)
Average precipitation days (≥ 0.1 mm)	6.7	6.0	4.7	6.4	6.9	6.7	7.4	6.2	4.5	5.0	6.0	7.8	74.3
Average snowy days	14.8	11.2	4.8	1.2	0	0	0	0	0	0.9	6.6	15.0	54.5
Average relative humidity (%)	81	81	73	52	47	47	53	55	58	66	79	83	65
Mean monthly sunshine hours	119.6	139.1	213.6	264.4	307.7	301.4	309.9	301.0	271.0	229.1	136.8	91.5	2,685.1
Percentage possible sunshine	41	46	57	65	67	65	67	71	74	69	48	33	59
Source: China Meteorological Administrationall-time extreme temperature

Climate data for Mosuowan, Manas County, elevation 346 m (1,135 ft), (1991–2020 normals)
Month	Jan	Feb	Mar	Apr	May	Jun	Jul	Aug	Sep	Oct	Nov	Dec	Year
Mean daily maximum °C (°F)	−13.5 (7.7)	−7.7 (18.1)	6.5 (43.7)	21.2 (70.2)	27.8 (82.0)	32.6 (90.7)	33.5 (92.3)	32.2 (90.0)	26.4 (79.5)	16.7 (62.1)	3.6 (38.5)	−9.3 (15.3)	14.2 (57.5)
Daily mean °C (°F)	−18.4 (−1.1)	−13.4 (7.9)	0.5 (32.9)	13.6 (56.5)	20.3 (68.5)	25.1 (77.2)	26.0 (78.8)	24.1 (75.4)	18.0 (64.4)	9.0 (48.2)	−1.6 (29.1)	−13.3 (8.1)	7.5 (45.5)
Mean daily minimum °C (°F)	−22.5 (−8.5)	−18.3 (−0.9)	−4.9 (23.2)	6.6 (43.9)	13.2 (55.8)	17.9 (64.2)	18.9 (66.0)	16.8 (62.2)	10.4 (50.7)	2.6 (36.7)	−5.7 (21.7)	−16.9 (1.6)	1.5 (34.7)
Average precipitation mm (inches)	5.2 (0.20)	5.2 (0.20)	7.0 (0.28)	15.3 (0.60)	17.7 (0.70)	17.0 (0.67)	19.8 (0.78)	16.8 (0.66)	9.8 (0.39)	13.3 (0.52)	9.5 (0.37)	7.4 (0.29)	144 (5.66)
Average precipitation days (≥ 0.1 mm)	5.1	4.4	3.3	5.1	6.2	6.8	7.8	6.4	4.5	5.0	4.3	6.1	65
Average snowy days	10.6	7.7	3.1	0.6	0	0	0	0	0	0.4	4.5	9.8	36.7
Average relative humidity (%)	81	82	69	44	38	43	51	51	49	60	76	83	61
Mean monthly sunshine hours	127.2	150.0	225.7	268.3	318.9	321.1	329.8	319.9	282.2	237.6	143.5	99.0	2,823.2
Percentage possible sunshine	44	50	60	65	69	69	71	75	77	72	51	36	62
Source: China Meteorological Administration

== Transport ==
Manas is served by China National Highway 312, the Northern Xinjiang and the Second Ürümqi-Jinghe Railways.

== Notable persons ==
- Shewket Imin

== See also ==
- 1906 Manasi earthquake
