= Changji Hui Autonomous Prefecture =

Autonomous prefecture in Xinjiang, China

Coordinates: 44.01°N 87.31°E

- Autonomous prefecture

Chinese transcription(s)
  - Hanzi: 昌吉回族自治州
  - Pinyin: Chāngjí Huízú Zìzhìzhōu
  - Xiao'erjing: چَانْ‌ݣِ خُوِزُوْ زِجِ‌جِوْ

Uyghur transcription(s)
  - Arabic alphabet: سانجى خۇيزۇ ئاپتونوم ئوبلاستى
  - SASM/GNC: Sanji Huyzu Aptonom Oblasti
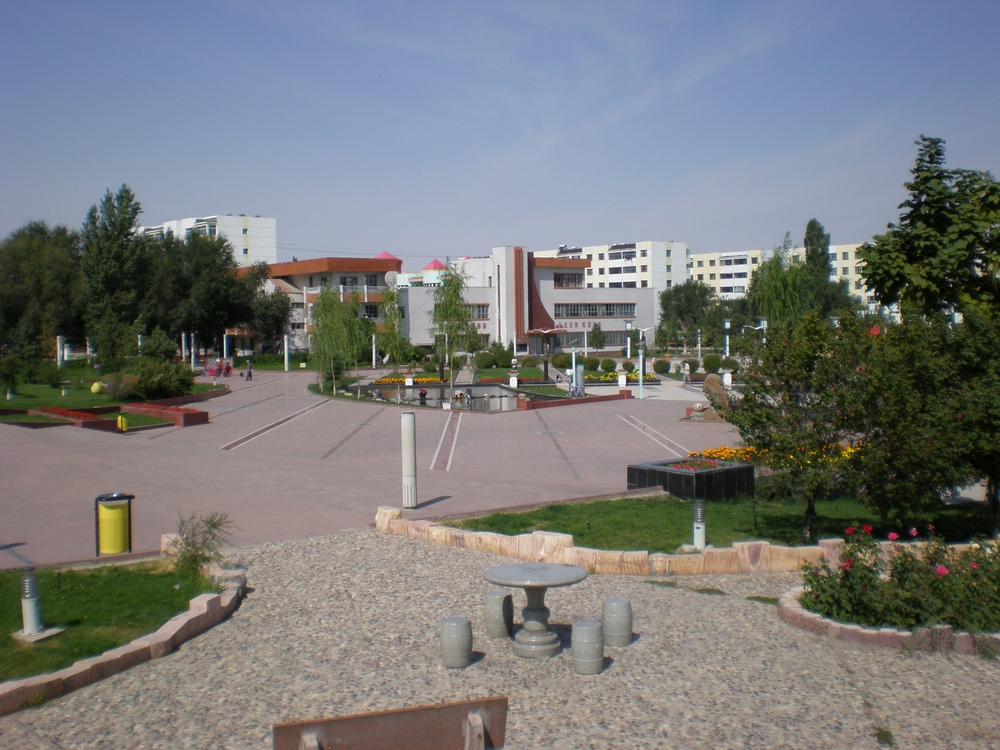
- Fukang City in the prefecture

- Changji Prefecture (red) in Xinjiang (orange)
- Country: People's Republic of China
- Autonomous region: Xinjiang
- Prefectural seat: Changji

Area
  - Total: 73,485 km^{2} (28,373 sq mi)

Population (2020)
  - Total: 1,613,585
  - Density: 21.958/km^{2} (56.871/sq mi)

GDP
  - Total: CN¥ 250.9 billion US$ 35.2 billion
  - Per capita: CN¥ 154,571; US$ 21,704
- Time zone: UTC+8 (China Standard)
- ISO 3166 code: CN-XJ-23

Changji Hui Autonomous Prefecture

Chinese name
- Chinese: 昌吉回族自治州
Transcriptions
Standard Mandarin
- Hanyu Pinyin: Chāngjí Huízú Zìzhìzhōu
- Wade–Giles: Chʻang¹-chi² Hui²-tsu² Tzŭ⁴-chih⁴-chou¹
other Mandarin
- Xiao'erjing: چَانْ‌ݣِ خُوِزُوْ زِجِ‌جِوْ

Uyghur name
- Uyghur: سانجى خۇيزۇ ئاپتونوم ئوبلاستى
Transcriptions
- Latin Yëziqi: Sanji Xuyzu Aptonom Oblasti
- Yengi Yeziⱪ: Sanji Huyzu Aptonom Oblasti
- SASM/GNC: Sanji Huyzu Aptonom Oblasti
- Siril Yëziqi: Санҗи Хуизу Аптоном Области

Changji Hui Autonomous Prefecture (Chinese: 昌吉回族自治州; Uyghur: سانجى خۇيزۇ ئاپتونوم ئوبلاستى) is an autonomous prefecture for Hui people in the mid-north of Xinjiang Uyghur Autonomous Region, Western China. The prefecture has an area of 77,129 km^{2} (29,780 sq mi) and its seat is Changji City.

To the south lies the snow-capped Tianshan Mountains throughout the year, with extensive forests and pastures at the mountain foot; the northern region consists of vast grasslands in the Junggar Basin. The population of Changji Prefecture is ethnically diverse, with Han Chinese making up approximately 75%, Hui people around 10%, and Kazakh people about 9% of the total population.

== Subdivisions ==
Changji directly controls 2 county-level cities, 4 counties and 1 autonomous county.

Map
Name	Hanzi	Hanyu Pinyin	Xiao'erjing	Uyghur (UEY)	Uyghur Latin (ULY)	Population (2020 Census)	Area (km^{2})	Density (/km^{2})
Changji City	昌吉市	Chāngjí Shì	چَانْ‌ݣِ شِ	سانجى شەھىرى	Sanji Shehiri	607,441	7,971	76.2
Fukang City	阜康市	Fùkāng Shì	فُ‌کَانْ شِ	فۇكاڭ شەھىرى	Fukang Shehiri	181,144	8,529	21.24
Hutubi County	呼图壁县	Hūtúbì Xiàn	خُ‌تُ‌بِ ثِیًا	قۇتۇبى ناھىيىسى	Qutubi Nahiyisi	192,638	9,518	20.24
Manas County	玛纳斯县	Mǎnàsī Xiàn	مَانَاسِ ثِیًا	ماناس ناھىيىسى	Manas Nahiyisi	192,098	9,171	20.95
Qitai County	奇台县	Qítái Xiàn	کِ‌تَیْ ثِیًا	گۇچۇڭ ناھىيىسى	Guchung Nahiyisi	219,811	16,645	13.21
Jimsar County	吉木萨尔县	Jímùsà'ěr Xiàn	ݣِ‌مُ‌سَاعَر ثِیًا	جىمىسار ناھىيىسى	Jimisar Nahiyisi	153,197	8,141	18.82
Mori Kazakh Autonomous County	木垒哈萨克自治县	Mùlěi Hāsàkè Zìzhìxiàn	مُ‌لُوِ خَاسَاکْ زِجِ‌ثِیًا	مورى قازاق ئاپتونوم ناھىيىسى	Mori Qazaq Aptonom Nahiyisi	67,256	13,510	4.98

- Defunct: Miquan (county-level city)

== History ==
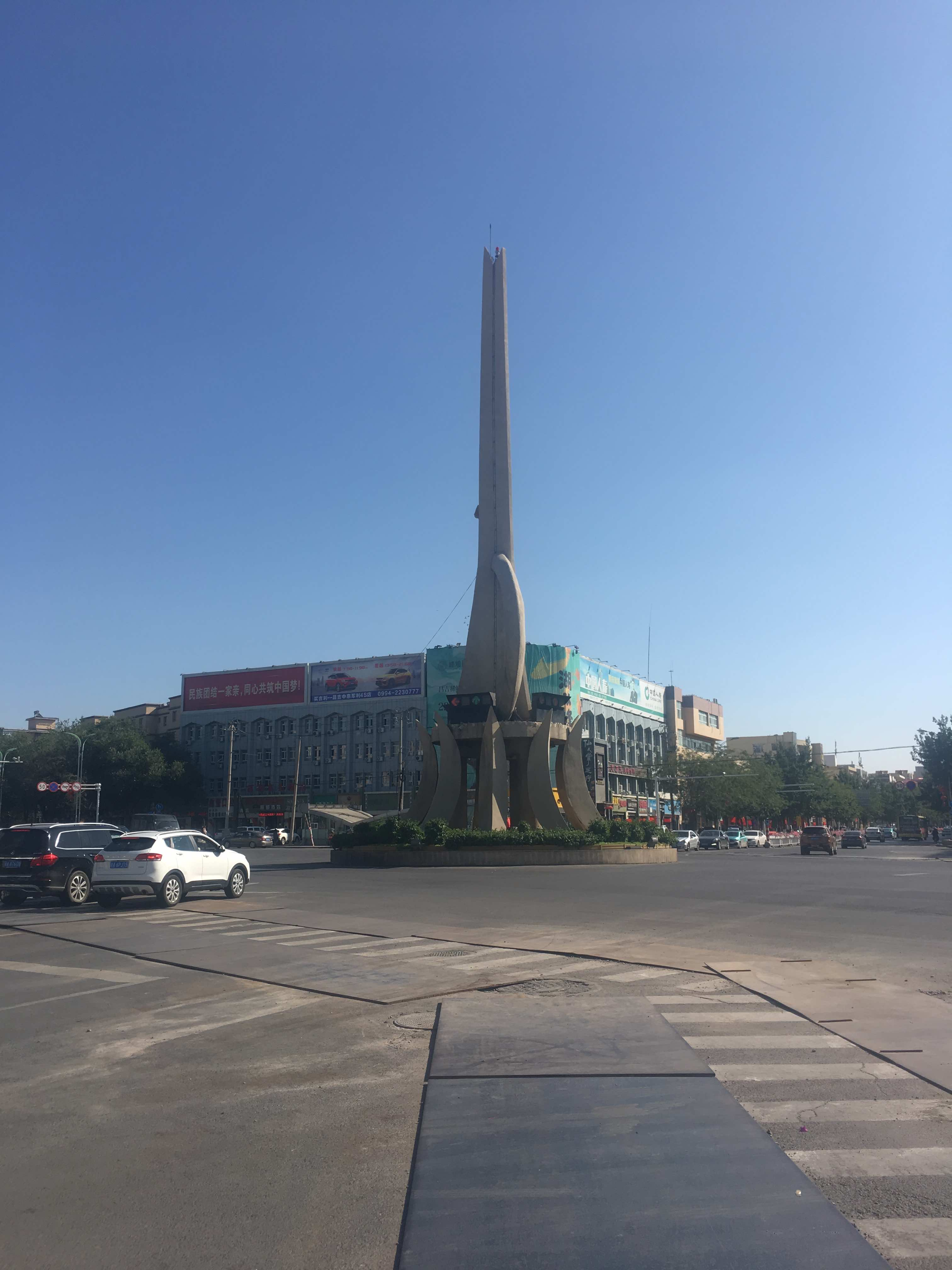
Flying Horse Roundabout, Changji City

During the Western Han dynasty, the region belonged to the Rear Cheshi Kingdom, one of the Western Regions states. In 102 BCE, the Han established control through the Protectorate of the Western Regions, and by 60 BCE formally instituted the Protectorate headquartered at Beiting (modern Jimsar County), which lasted for over 400 years.

Between the 3rd and 6th centuries CE, nomadic powers such as the Gaoche, Loulan, and Turkic tribes governed this area.

In 640 CE (Tang Zhenguan 14), the Tang dynasty created Ting Prefecture over the region, and in 702 CE (Chang'an 2, under Wu Zetian) elevated it to the Beiting Protectorate, covering areas north of the Tianshan and south of Lake Balkhash.

From 1954 to 2007, administrative changes included the founding of the Changji Hui Autonomous Prefecture, incorporation of surrounding counties, and adjustments such as merging Miquan into Ürümqi and establishing Midong District.

== Demographics ==
According to the 2010 census, Changji had a population of 1,428,587 inhabitants, with a population density of 19.4 inhabitants per km^{2}. Its population in the 2000 census was 1,503,097. Part of the change in population is due to boundary changes, for example, the formerly county-level city Miquan was merged into Midong District and became part of Ürümqi in 2007. The population in 2000 minus Miquan was 1,322,145.

Nationality	2000		2010	
Nationality	Population	%	Population	%
Han	1,075,852	75.31%	1,129,384	73.91%
Hui	136,013	9.52%	176,563	11.55%
Kazakh	119,942	8.40%	133,286	8.72%
Uyghur	58,984	4.13%	63,606	4.16%
Total	1,428,587	100%	1,528,097	100%

== Geography ==
Changji Hui Autonomous Prefecture features a terrain that is high in the south and low in the north, sloping from southeast to northwest. The southern part lies in the Tianshan Mountains, the central region is a vast alluvial plain, and the north is dominated by the Gurbantünggüt Desert Basin. This region is known as the "Northern Slope of the Tianshan Mountains" and includes the Beita Mountain range in the east—an east–west extension of the Tianshan and north-south Altay ranges.

It can be classified into four geomorphological units: the Tianshan mountain system, tilted alluvial plain, desert basin, and Beita Mountain system. The Tianshan Mountains run east–west through central Xinjiang, dividing Xinjiang into southern and northern regions. The central plain—formed by fluvial and alluvial processes—supports fertile oasis agriculture. To the north lies the Junggar Basin and the Gurbantünggüt Desert. Beita Mountain, a southern spur of the Altay Mountains, forms the northeastern margin of the prefecture.

Surface water includes glaciers, snowmelt, rivers, springs, lakes, reservoirs, and irrigation channels. Glaciers and perennial snow cover mirror altitudes above 3,800 m—present in all counties except Mulei, serving as “natural reservoirs” for runoff. The basin's rivers are short and reliant on mountain sources; most do not reach the sea, except the Manas River, which terminates in Manas Lake. Notable lakes include Tianchi in the Tian Shan range and Dongdaohaizi on the desert fringe of Mìquan County.

Changji's climate is temperate continental arid, characterized by cold winters, hot summers, and large diurnal temperature variations. Due to elevation differences, precipitation increases from north to south. The northern desert exhibits strong arid characteristics. Annual sunshine totals around 2,700 hours, and average precipitation is approximately 190 mm, with most rainfall occurring in summer. The frost-free period spans 160–190 days per year.

== Transportation ==
=== Highways ===
- G7 Beijing–Ürümqi Expressway traverses Changji Prefecture.
- G30 Lianyungang–Khorgas Expressway passes through Changji.
- National Highways 216, 312, 335, 679, and 691 serve the prefecture.

=== Rail ===
- The Lanzhou–Xinjiang Railway connects through Changji Station, linking the prefecture to the national rail network.

=== Urban Rail & Maglev ===
- The proposed Ürümqi–Changji Maglev is planned to run ~24 km from Ürümqi Airport to Changji West Outer Ring, with 5 stations and one rail depot

== Sister cities ==
- Barnaul, Altai Krai, Russia
