= Manasi River =

River in China

The Manasi River (simplified Chinese: 玛纳斯河; traditional Chinese: 瑪納斯河; pinyin: Mǎnàsī hé, Uyghur: ماناس دەرياسى), also known as the Manas River, is the largest endorheic river on the northern slopes of the Tianshan Mountains in Xinjiang, China. It originates from the Erenhabirga Mountains (依连哈比尔尕山) in Hejing County, Bayingolin Mongol Autonomous Prefecture, and flows northwest through Manas County, ultimately entering Lake Manas. The river stretches approximately 504.3 km (313.4 mi) in length.

The Manas River marks the boundary between Changji Hui Autonomous Prefecture, Shihezi City, Tacheng Prefecture, and Karamay City. Historically, it provided essential irrigation for surrounding oases and agricultural lands. However, with the rise of intensive irrigation since the 1960s, much of the river’s flow has been diverted, resulting in the desiccation of Lake Manas.

The name "Manas" is derived from the Mongolian word "manaa" (Mongolian: ᠮᠠᠨᠠᠭ᠎ᠠ), meaning "to guard" or "to patrol", combined with the suffix "-s" (ᠰ), forming "Manas" or "patroller." This etymology is documented in Qing-era works such as Xinjiang Tuzhi (新疆图志), which attributes the name to patrol forces stationed along the riverbanks during the late Qing dynasty.

The river lends its name to Manas County, which depends heavily on the Manas River for agriculture, industry, and drinking water. Numerous reservoirs and canals—including the Jiahezi Reservoir—form an integrated water system supporting over 500,000 residents in the basin.

== Hydrology ==
The Manas River originates in the central section of the Tianshan Mountains, specifically from the Erenhabirga Mountains (依连哈比尔尕山). Its source region contains approximately 800 glaciers, covering a total area of 608 square kilometers. In the upper course, the river cuts through deep gorges in the mountains as it flows northward. After exiting the mountains, it turns northwestward, traversing the piedmont alluvial plain and skirting the western edge of the Gurbantünggüt Desert before eventually emptying into Lake Manas.

The river's water primarily comes from snowmelt and precipitation in the high mountains. The upper catchment covers an area of 5,156 square kilometers, while the entire basin spans 10,650 square kilometers. The Manas River has a long-term average annual runoff of 1.28 billion cubic meters, with an average discharge rate of 40.5 cubic meters per second. The annual sediment transport is approximately 1.96 million tonnes.

From November to the following April, the river’s discharge accounts for only 14.4% of its total annual runoff. In contrast, the months of June to August represent the flood season, during which time the river carries 66.84% of its yearly flow.

== Utilization ==
During the Qing Dynasty, the Manas River bed was already being exploited for nephrite jade and gold.

Since the 1950s, numerous water conservancy projects have been constructed in the Manas River Irrigation District, which uses the Manas River as its primary water source. These projects include 20 plains reservoirs such as the Yuejin Reservoir, Daqiengou Reservoir, Mogu Lake Reservoir, and Jiahezi Reservoir. The total designed reservoir capacity is about 520 million cubic meters, with the main irrigation intake gate designed for a discharge of 105 cubic meters per second. The irrigated area covers 2,040 square kilometers, with major crops including wheat, cotton, and corn.

The Manas River is also an important stopover for migratory birds, with several sections designated as part of the Manas River National Wetland Park. However, years of excessive water extraction have reduced the river’s reach, now ending in a small depression southeast of Karamay. The middle and lower reaches remain dry for most of the year, causing severe ecological degradation in wetland functional zones. Lake Manas also dried up in 1962.
