= Orku, Karamay =

Orku: 乌尔禾区 (Chinese); ئورقۇ رايونى (Uyghur)
- District
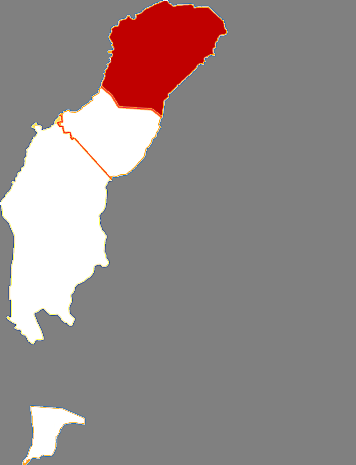
- Orku in Karamay

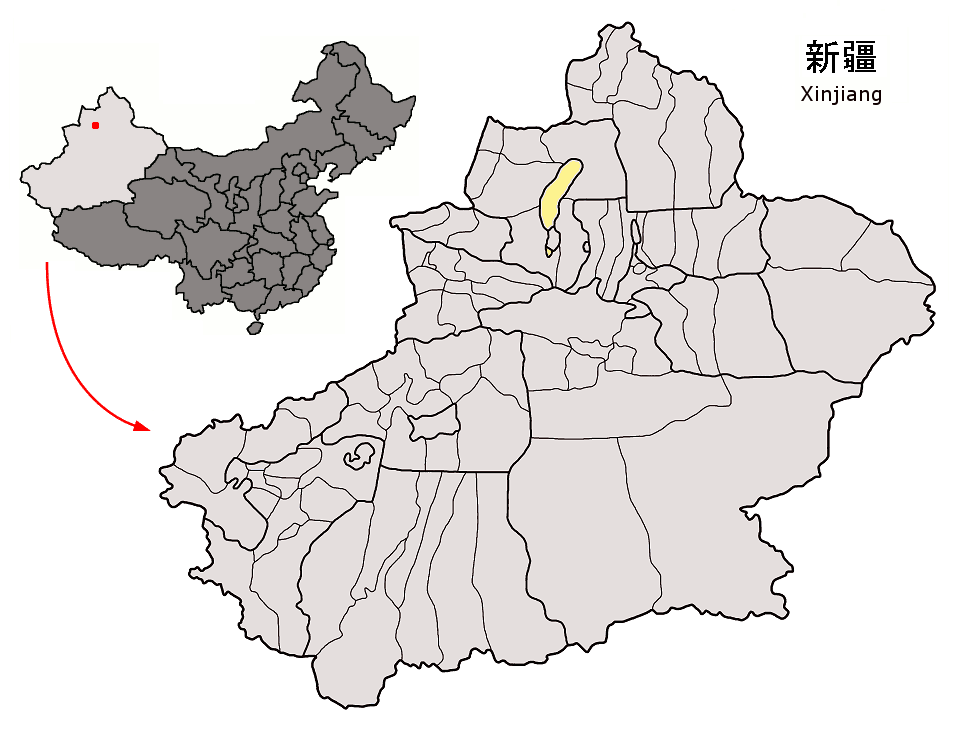
- Karamay in Xinjiang

- Location of the seat in Xinjiang Orku (Xinjiang) Orku (China)
- Coordinates: 46°05′20″N 85°41′38″E
- Country: China
- Autonomous region: Xinjiang
- Prefecture-level city: Karamay
- District seat: Liushu Street Subdistrict

Area
  - Total: 2,233 km^{2} (862 sq mi)

Population (2020)
  - Total: 17,940
  - Density: 8.034/km^{2} (20.81/sq mi)
- Time zone: UTC+8 (China Standard (Note: Locals in Xinjiang frequently observe UTC+6 (Xinjiang Time), 2 hours behind Beijing.))
- Website: www.weh.gov.cn

Orku, Karamay

Chinese name
- Simplified Chinese: 乌尔禾区
- Traditional Chinese: 烏爾禾區
Transcriptions
Standard Mandarin
- Hanyu Pinyin: Wū'ěrhé Qū

Uyghur name
- Uyghur: ئورقۇ رايونى
Transcriptions
- Latin Yëziqi: Orqu Rayoni
- Yengi Yeziⱪ: Orⱪu Rayoni
- Siril Yëziqi: Орқу Райони

Orku District (simplified Chinese: 乌尔禾区; traditional Chinese: 烏爾禾區; pinyin: Wū'ěrhé Qū; Uyghur: ئورقۇ رايونى, romanized: Orqu Rayoni, Orⱪu Rayoni, Орқу Райони) is a district of Karamay City, Xinjiang, China. It contains an area of 2,229 km^{2} (861 sq mi). According to the 2002 census, it has a population of 10,000.

Orku District is supplied with water by the Baiyang River and the Irtysh–Karamay Canal. The canal's Fengcheng Reservoir is located at the northern border of the district, about 15 km (9.3 mi) north of the district's main urban area.

== Administrative divisions ==
Orku District contains 1 subdistrict and 1 town:

Name	Simplified Chinese	Hanyu Pinyin	Uyghur (UEY)	Uyghur Latin (ULY)	Administrative division code
Subdistrict
Liushu Street Subdistrict	柳树街街道	Liǔshùjiē Jiēdào	سۆگەت كوچىسى كوچا باشقارمىسى	Söget kochisi kocha bashqarmisi	650205001
Town
Orkhu Town	乌尔禾镇	Wū'ěrhé Zhèn	ئورقۇ بازىرى	Orqu baziri	650205100

== Transport ==
- China National Highway 217
