= Irtysh–Karamay–Ürümqi Canal =

Irrigation project

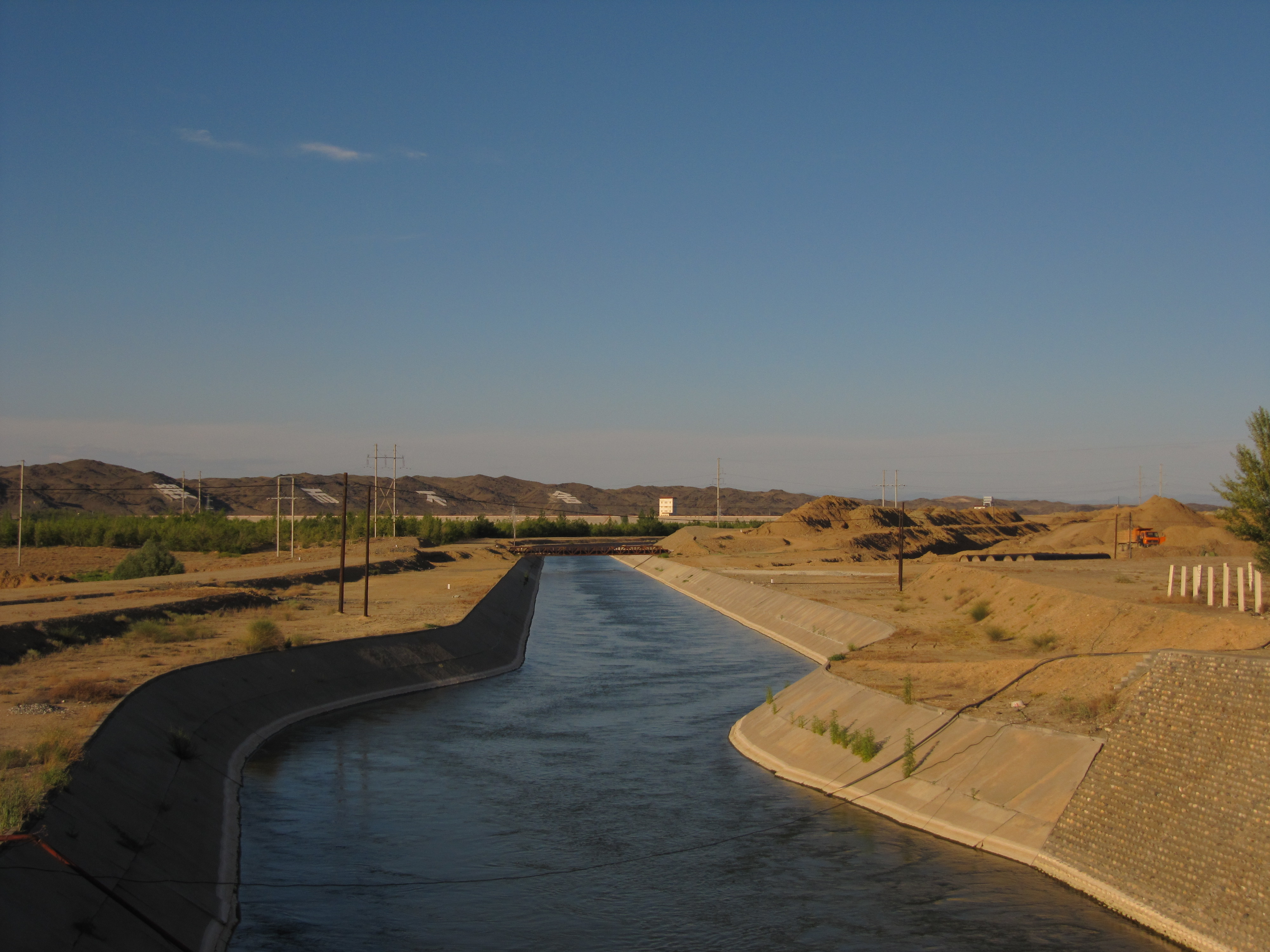
- The Irtysh–Karamay Canal near its beginning at the Project 635 Reservoir
- Interactive map of Irtysh–Karamay–Ürümqi Canal
- Location: Xinjiang, China

Geography
- Direction: South, Southwest
- Start point: Irtysh River
- End point: Karamay; Urumqi
- Beginning coordinates: 47°14′06″N 88°28′44″E
- Ending coordinates: 45°34′08″N 84°51′07″E; 44°12′18″N 97°49′44″E

The Irtysh–Karamay–Ürümqi Canal (Chinese: 引额济克(乌)工程; pinyin: Yǐn-É-jì-Kè (Wū) gōngchéng; lit. 'Irtysh River Diversion to Karamay (Ürümqi) Project'), also known as the Project 635 (Chinese: 635工程; pinyin: 635 gōngchéng; lit. 'Project 635') Canal, is a system of water-transfer canals and reservoirs in the northern part of China's Xinjiang Uighur Autonomous Region. It transfers water from the Irtysh River (which flows toward the Arctic Ocean) into several dry endorheic basins of north-central Xinjiang, where it is used for irrigation and general use of the population and industries.

The canal is often referred in Chinese publications simply the "Project for Supplying Water From the Irtysh" ("引额供水"工程).

According to Chinese planners, the water carried by the canal will eventually irrigate 140,000 hectares of land. An important user of the canal's water is the petroleum industry around Karamay.

== History ==
The ideas for redirecting some of the waters of the Irtysh for irrigation use in the (Soviet) Central Asia was actively discussed in the USSR in the mid-20th century. However, the bulk of the Soviet Northern river reversal project was never implemented; only a fairly minor Irtysh–Karaganda Canal was constructed in central Kazakhstan. The upper course of the Irtysh, is, however, in China, and it was the Chinese authorities who, in the 1990s, embarked on a large-scale project for the use of some of the waters of that river in the Chinese part of Central Asia, i.e. Xinjiang. The project was approved by all the relevant authorities by 2000, and construction work started soon thereafter. The water reached Karamay by 2008.

== Description ==
=== Main Trunk Canal ===
The 134 km long Main Trunk Canal (总干渠) of the Irtysh–Karamay–Ürümqi system starts at the Project 635 Dam on the upper Irtysh, at 47.233615°N 88.478394°E, in Fuhai (Burultokay) County of Altay Prefecture. The Main Trunk Canal runs in the general southern and southwestern direction, toward the Ulungur River. A significant amount of irrigated agriculture has been developed downhill (i.e., northwest) of the canal in many areas.

The Main Trunk Canal crosses the Ulungur River over an aqueduct at 46°36′00″N 87°57′00″E. At 46°31′04″N 87°56′15″E the Main Trunk Canal is divided into two branches: the West Trunk Canal (西干渠), running toward Karamay, and the East Trunk Canal (东干渠), running toward Ürümqi.

=== West Trunk Canal ===
From the three trunk canals' junction point, the West Trunk Canal running in the general southwestern direction, skirting the northwestern edge of the Dzungarian Basin along the foothills of the mountains that form the basin's border.

The West Trunk of the Irtysh–Karamay Canal crosses the Baiyang River on an aqueduct at 46°7′45″N 85°25′35″E, upstream of Urho District's main urban area. A provision is made for letting some water flow from the canal into the Baiyang River, (46°7′45″N 85°25′40″E), thus improving the water supply situation in Urho District, and maintaining the stable water level in the Ailik Lake into which the Baiyang River flows.

On reaching downtown Karamay, the 8.5-km-long section of the canal, known the Karamay River (克拉玛依河, Kèlāmǎyī hé) or the City River (穿城河, Chuān chéng hé) becomes the centerpiece of the city's main park (45°34′54″N 84°52′36″E). The canal apparently ends (45°34′20″N 84°51′20″E) in Aykula (Aikule) Reservoir (阿依库勒水库), just south of downtown Karamay.

Several other reservoirs have been constructed along the route of the canal, including:

- Fengcheng Reservoir north of Urho (46°13′00″N 85°39′00″E);
- one in Baijiantan District (45°43′00″N 85°07′22″E);
- Sanping Reservoir (三平水库) in Karamay (45°40′00″N 84°58′00″E).

=== East Trunk Canal ===
From the three trunk canals' junction, the more recently constructed 420-km-long East Trunk Canal almost immediately goes into a ~15-km long tunnel (portals at 46°30′55″N 87°56′14″E and 46°22′53″N 87°56′37″E). After leaving the tunnel, it runs in the general southern direction across the almost uninhabited Gurbantünggüt Desert It reaches the Tian Shan piedmont belt of human habitation at Daquan Ranch (大泉牧场) in Fukang County-level city at around 44°24′00″N 88°24′15″E. Via branch canals, the East Trunk Canal supplies water to a number of reservoirs in Fukang County-level city (e.g., the one at 44°16′25″N 88°7′40″E), terminating in the large reservoir known as "Reservoir 500" (“500”水库;44°12′00″N 87°49′00″E) on the border of Fukang County-level city and Ürümqi's suburban Midong District. A new industrial area, called Ganquanbao Industrial Parl (甘泉堡工业园), or Industrial New City 500 (500工业新城) is being developed west of the reservoir, relying on it for water supply.

West of Reservoir 500, a network of canals serves a large area of Midong District; in particular, a major canal runs to a small reservoir at 44°4′40″N 87°36′30″E.

=== Tunnels ===
There are several tunnels along the canal's route, including the Dingshan Tunnel (Chinese: 顶山隧洞), which is 7,415 m long.

== More water for the canal ==
The Project 635 reservoir is required not only to supply the Irtysh–Karamay–Ürümqi Canal with water, but also to maintain a sufficient amount of water flow in the Irtysh below the dam, for the local agricultural use and ecosystem maintenance. To improve the water balance at the reservoir, the local authorities are envisioning the so-called Project for Bringing Western Water to the East (西水东引工程). The project would involve the construction of a canal whereby water could be transferred from the Burqin Shankou Reservoir on the Burqin River to the Project 635 reservoir on the Irtysh. Even though the Burqin is a tributary of the Irtysh, its natural confluence point with the Irtysh is in Burqin Town (the county seat of Burqin County), which is over 100 km downstream from the Project 635 Dam, and in the absence of the "Bringing Western Water to the East" canal its waters would not be available at the Project 635 location.

== See also ==
- South–North Water Transfer Project
