= Saur Mountains =

Mountain range in China and Kazakhstan

Saur
- Location within China Location within Kazakhstan

Highest point
- Peak: Sauyr Zhotasy (Muz Tau)
- Elevation: 3,840 m (12,600 ft)

Naming
- Native name: 萨吾尔山 (Chinese); Сауыр жоталары (Kazakh)

Geography
- Location: China–Kazakhstan border
- Countries: Kazakhstan and China
- Range coordinates: 47°04′N 85°34′E

The Saur Mountains (Chinese: 萨吾尔山; pinyin: Sàwú'ěr Shān; Kazakh: Сауыр жоталары, Sauyr jotalary; Russian: Саур) is one of the mountain ranges in the Tian Shan system. An eastern extension of the Tarbagatai Mountains, it starts on the China-Kazakhstan border and continues east into China, where it forms the border between the Hoboksar Mongol Autonomous County and Jeminay County of Xinjiang.

The highest peak of the range, and of the entire Saur-Tarbagatai mountain system, is the ice-capped Sauyr Zhotasy, also known as the Muz Tau.

Streams flowing south from the Saur make irrigated agriculture possible, although on a very limited scale, in their valleys in Hoboksar County. One of them reaches as far as the large oasis seen on Google Maps at 46°10′00″N 86°25′00″E, in the southern part of Xiazigai Township (夏孜盖乡, Xiàzīgài xiāng). Apparently it is streams like this that Chinese geographers describe as "seasonal rivers sourcing from the northern mountains" whose water occasionally reaches the Manas Lake.
