= Gurbantünggüt Desert =

Desert in Xinjiang, China

Location of the Gurbantünggüt Desert

The Gurbantünggüt Desert (Kazakh: Құрбантұңғыт шөлі قۇربانتۇڭعىت ءشولى; Uyghur: قۇربانتۈڭغۈت قۇملۇقى, Qurbantüngghüt Qumluqi; simplified Chinese: 古尔班通古特沙漠; traditional Chinese: 古爾班通古特沙漠; pinyin: Gǔ'ěrbāntōnggǔtè Shāmò) occupies a large part of the Dzungarian Basin in Northern Xinjiang, in the northwest of the People's Republic of China. It is also called by some sources Dzoosotoyn Elisen Desert, from the Mongolian language (means "rich desert").

It is about 50,000 square kilometers (19,000 mi^{2}) and around 300 to 600 meters above sea level. It is Xinjiang's second largest desert, after the Taklamakan Desert, which is in the Tarim Basin.

A remote rugged area, the Gurbantünggüt Desert is separated by the Tian Shan mountains from the Ili River Basin, Turfan Depression and Tarim Basin of southern Xinjiang. A chain of cities, the largest of which is Ürümqi, are within a populated strip (the route of the Lanxin Railway) south of the desert, which is irrigated by glacier-fed streams flowing from the Tian Shan. The Irtysh–Karamay Canal, constructed during the first decade of the 21st century, skirts the desert's northwestern edge; the Irtysh–Ürümqi Canal crosses the desert's central part.

Several salt lakes are in the western part of the Gurbantünggüt Desert. This includes the Manas Lake (45°48′00″N 85°56′00″E), which was in the past fed by the Manas River, but now has mostly dried out, and the Ailik Lake (45°56′00″N 85°47′00″E), which receives water from the Baiyang River (which is replenished by the Irtysh–Karamay Canal).

China National Highway 216 crosses the desert in north–south, from Altay City to Ürümqi. China National Highway 217 and the Kuytun–Beitun Railway skirt it from the west and northwest. The Ürümqi–Dzungaria Railway reaches into the desert's southeastern corner, known locally as Jiangjun Gobi (将军戈壁, "General's Desert").

The climate of the area is temperate, but very continental. The desert's ecological environment is very fragile and the impact of human activities on the environment, including the building of a trans-desert highway, has been increasingly significant.

The remotest point of land from any sea is in this desert. According to some calculations, the precise point is at 46°16.8′N 86°40.2′E. It was pinpointed and reached on 27 June 1986 by British explorers Nicholas Crane and Richard Crane; the location was described as being in the Dzoosotoyn Elisen Desert. This position is over 2,600 kilometers (1,600 mi) from the nearest coastline.

== See also ==
- Kumtag Desert
