= Manen Zeyneluly =

Chinese politician (born 1958)

Mänen Zeinelūly
- Мәнен Зейнелұлы

Vice Chairman of the Standing Committee of the People's Congress of Xinjiang
- In office January 2016 – February 2021
- Chairman: Neyim Yasin; Shewket Imin

Governor of Ili Kazakh Autonomous Prefecture
- In office February 2012 – January 2016
- Party Secretary: Huang Sanping
- Preceded by: Mawken Seyitqamzaüli
- Succeeded by: Qūrmaş Syrjanūly

Governor of Tacheng Prefecture
- In office February 2008 – December 2011
- Party Secretary: Peng Jiarui; Zhang Bo
- Preceded by: Tilepaldı Äbdiraşïd
- Succeeded by: Aqanulı Sarqıt

Personal details
- Born: January 1958 (age 68) Fuyun County, Xinjiang, China
- Party: Chinese Communist Party
- Education: Central Party School of the Chinese Communist Party

Chinese name
- Simplified Chinese: 马宁·再尼勒
- Traditional Chinese: 馬寧·再尼勒
Transcriptions
Standard Mandarin
- Hanyu Pinyin: Mǎníng Zàinílè

Mänen Zeinelūly (Kazakh: Мәнен Зейнелұлы, born November 1958) is a Chinese politician of Kazakh ethnicity who served as vice chairman of the Standing Committee of the People's Congress of Xinjiang Uygur Autonomous Region between 2016 and 2021, governor of Ili Kazakh Autonomous Prefecture between 2012 and 2016, and governor of Tacheng Prefecture between 2008 and 2011.

== Biography ==
Mänen Zeinelūly was born in Fuyun County, Xinjiang, in November 1958. He was a translator and interpreter in the Fuyun County People's Government from 1976 to 1989. He served as deputy party secretary of Kürti Township in November 1989, and five months later promoted to the party secretary position. In December 1992, he became deputy magistrate of Fuyun County, rising to magistrate in December 1997. In November 2000, he was admitted to member of the standing committee of the CPC Altay Prefecture Committee, the prefecture's top authority. He was made deputy party secretary of Tacheng Prefecture in August 2005, concurrently serving as secretary of its Commission for Discipline Inspection, the party's agency in charge of anti-corruption efforts. In February 2008, he took office as governor of Tacheng Prefecture, replacing Tilepaldı Äbdiraşïd. In February 2012, he was appointed governor of Ili Kazakh Autonomous Prefecture, succeeding Mawken Seyitqamzaüli. In January 2012, he became vice chairman of the Standing Committee of the People's Congress of Xinjiang Uygur Autonomous Region in January 2016, serving in the post until his retirement in February 2021.

He was a representative of the 18th National Congress of the Chinese Communist Party. He was a delegate to the 11th National People's Congress.

Government offices
Preceded by Tilepaldı Äbdiraşïd	Governor of Tacheng Prefecture; 2008–2011	Succeeded by Aqanulı Sarqıt
Preceded by Mawken Seyitqamzaüli	Governor of Ili Kazakh Autonomous Prefecture; 2012–2016	Succeeded by Qūrmaş Syrjanūly
