= Mauken Seitkamzauly =

Chinese politician

- ماۋكەن سەيىتقامزاۇلى

Vice Chairman of the Xinjiang Regional Committee of the Chinese People's Political Consultative Conference
- In office January 2013 – January 2016
- Chairman: Nurlan Abilmazhinuly

Vice Chairman of the Standing Committee of the People's Congress of Xinjiang Uygur Autonomous Region
- In office January 2012 – January 2013
- Chairman: Arken Imirbaki

Governor of Ili Kazakh Autonomous Prefecture
- In office November 2007 – January 2012
- Party Secretary: Li Xianglin; Li Xuejun
- Preceded by: Qyzaijan Seiіlqojaūly
- Succeeded by: Mänen Zeýnelulı

Personal details
- Born: November 1952 (age 73) Altay Prefecture, Xinjiang, China
- Party: Chinese Communist Party
- Education: Xinjiang Radio and Television University

Chinese name
- Simplified Chinese: 毛肯·赛衣提哈木扎
- Traditional Chinese: 毛肯·賽衣提哈木扎
Transcriptions
Standard Mandarin
- Hanyu Pinyin: Máokěn Sàiyītíhāmùzhā

Mauken Seitkamzauly (Kazakh: ماۋكەن سەيىتقامزاۇلى, romanized: Mawken Seyitqamzaüly; born November 1952) is a retired Chinese politician of Kazakh ethnicity who served as vice chairman of the Xinjiang Regional Committee of the Chinese People's Political Consultative Conference from 2013 to 2016, vice chairman of the Standing Committee of the People's Congress of Xinjiang Uygur Autonomous Region from 2012 to 2013, governor of Ili Kazakh Autonomous Prefecture from 2007 to 2012, and governor of Altay Prefecture from 2003 to 2007.

== Biography ==
Mauken was born in Altay Prefecture, Xinjiang, in November 1952. After a year of studying at the Translation Class of Qinghe County Committee of the Chinese Communist Party (CCP) in July 1967, he became a sent-down youth in Dongfeng People's Commune (东风人民公社; 'East Wind People's Commune') and then Hongqi People's Commune (红旗人民公社; 'Red Flag People's Commune'). Since October 1972, he successively worked as a translator and interpreter in the Office of CCP Qinghe County Committee, CCP Altay Prefecture Committee, and CCP Ili Kazakh Autonomous Prefecture Committee.

In February 1984, he rose to become deputy director of the Office of Altay Prefecture People's Government, and held that office until June 1992, when he was appointed director of the Commercial Office of Altay Prefecture. In June 1994, he was elevated to deputy secretary-general of Altay Prefecture People's Government, a position at department level. In December 1996, he became deputy governor of Altay Prefecture, rising to governor in May 2003. In September 2007, he took office as CCP Deputy Committee Secretary of Ili Kazakh Autonomous Prefecture, concurrently holding the governor position two months later. In January 2012, he became vice chairman of the Standing Committee of the People's Congress of Xinjiang Uygur Autonomous Region, and a year later, vice chairman of the Xinjiang Regional Committee of the Chinese People's Political Consultative Conference, serving in the post until his resignation in January 2016.

He was a delegate to the 10th and 11th National People's Congress, and a member of the 12th Standing Committee of the Chinese People's Political Consultative Conference.

Government offices
Preceded by Qyzaijan Seiіlqojaūly	Governor of Ili Kazakh Autonomous Prefecture; 2007–2012	Succeeded by Mänen Zeýnelulı
