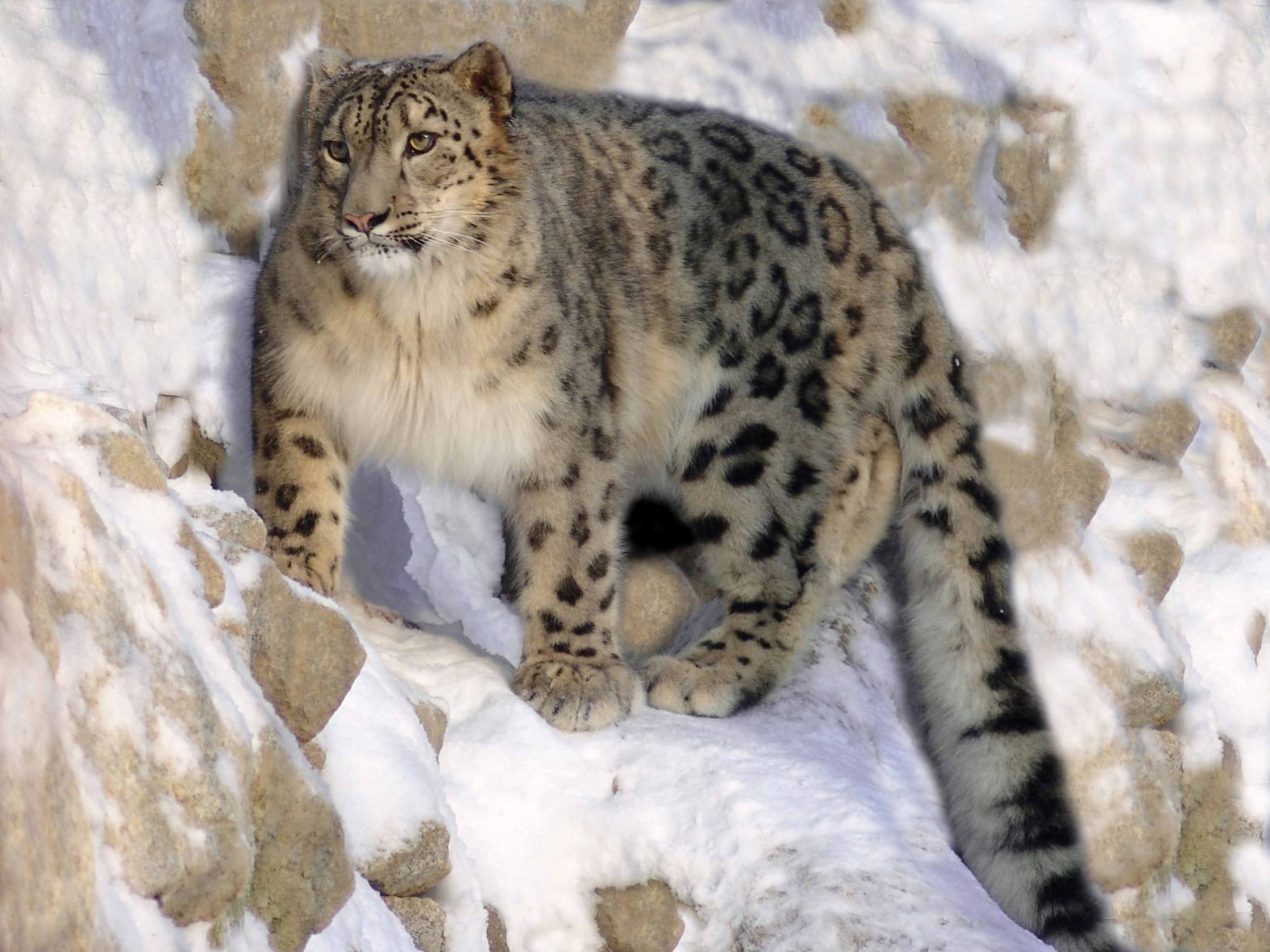
- Snow leopard

Conservation status
- Vulnerable (IUCN 3.1)
- CITES Appendix I

Scientific classification
- Kingdom: Animalia
- Phylum: Chordata
- Class: Mammalia
- Order: Carnivora
- Family: Felidae
- Genus: Panthera
- Species: P. uncia

Binomial name
- Panthera uncia (Schreber, 1775)
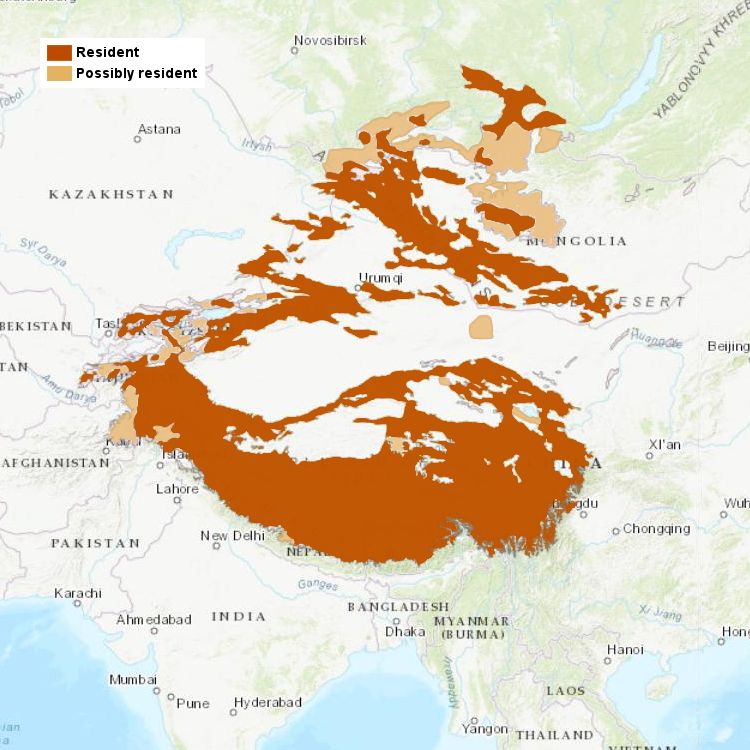
- Distribution of the snow leopard, 2017

Synonyms
- Felis uncia Schreber, 1777; Felis irbis Ehrenberg, 1830; Felis uncioides Horsfield, 1855; Uncia uncia Pocock, 1930; Panthera baikalensis-romanii Medvedev, 2000

= Snow leopard =

Snow leopard Temporal range: Late Pleistocene – Present

Species of large felid

The snow leopard (Panthera uncia) is a felid species in the genus Panthera. It has a thick whitish to grey fur with black spots on the head and neck, with larger rosettes on the back, flanks and bushy tail. Males are larger than the females, and both sexes have long canine teeth. Its small rounded ears, broad paws, and thick tails are adaptations for living in cold, mountainous environments.

The snow leopard is native to the mountain ranges of Asia, ranging from eastern Hindu Kush, the Himalayas and the Tibetan Plateau to southern Siberia, Mongolia and western China. It inhabits alpine and subalpine zones at elevations of 3,000–4,500 m (9,800–14,800 ft) featuring cliffs and ridges, but also lives at lower elevations in the northern part of its range. It is a solitary animal and is mostly active at dawn and twilight. It is a carnivore and actively hunts its prey, which include various ungulates and domestic livestock.

The snow leopard was long classified in the monotypic genus Uncia. Since phylogenetic studies revealed the relationships among Panthera species, it has been considered a member of that genus. Two subspecies were described based on morphological differences, but genetic differences between the two have not been confirmed. It is therefore regarded as a monotypic species. It forms a sister group with the tiger and the genetic divergence is estimated to have occurred 4.62 to 1.82 million years ago.

The snow leopard is listed as Vulnerable on the IUCN Red List because the global population is estimated to number fewer than 10,000 mature individuals and is expected to decline about 10% by 2040. It is mainly threatened by poaching and habitat destruction. It is listed in CITES Appendix I and legally protected in most countries of its range. It is widely used in heraldry and as an emblem in Central Asia and parts of North India.

== Etymology ==
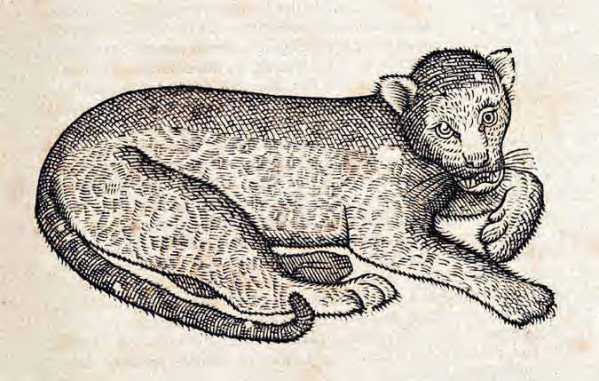
Illustration of an 'Ounce' (1658)

The word panther derives from the Classical Latin panthēra, itself from the Ancient Greek πάνθηρ pánthēr, which was used for spotted cats. The Latin name uncia and the English word ounce originate from the Old French word once, originally l'once, ultimately from Ancient Greek λύγξ lýnx.

== Taxonomy ==
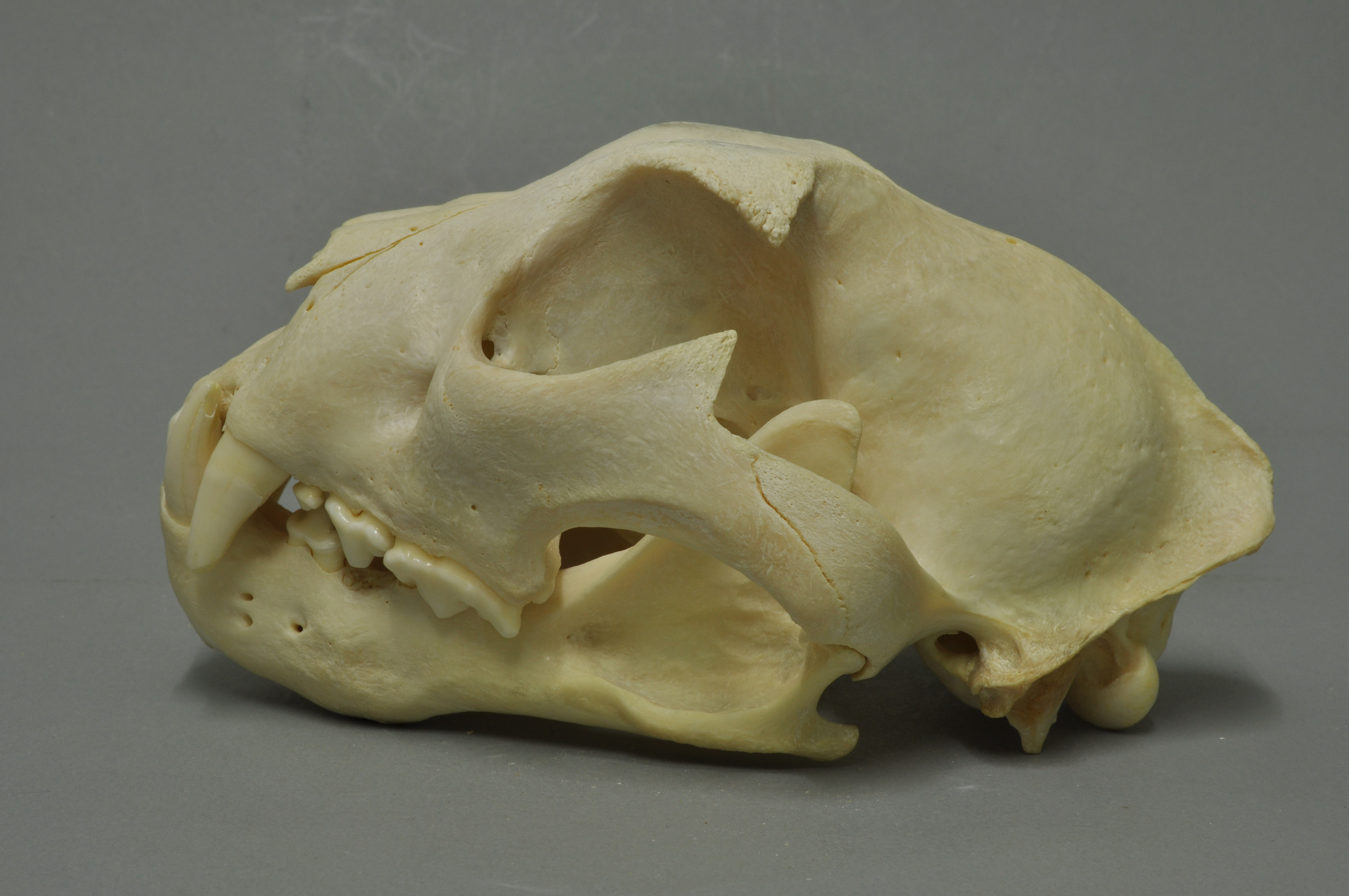
Snow leopard skull in the collection of the Museum Wiesbaden

Felis uncia was the scientific name used by Johann Christian Daniel von Schreber in 1777 who described a snow leopard based on an earlier description by Georges-Louis Leclerc, Comte de Buffon, assuming that the cat occurred along the Barbary Coast, in Persia, East India and China. The genus name Uncia was proposed by John Edward Gray in 1854 for Asian cats with a long and thick tail. Felis irbis was proposed by Christian Gottfried Ehrenberg in 1830, based on a skin of a female snow leopard collected in the Altai Mountains. He also clarified that several leopard (P. pardus) skins were previously misidentified as snow leopard skins. Felis uncioides was proposed by Thomas Horsfield in 1855 based on a snow leopard skin from Nepal in the collection of the Museum of the East India Company. Uncia uncia was the scientific name used by Reginald Innes Pocock in 1930 to denote the species when he reviewed skins and skulls of various Panthera species from Asia. He also described the morphological differences between snow leopard and leopard skins. Panthera baikalensis-romanii was proposed by a Russian scientist in 2000 based on a dark brown snow leopard skin from the Petrovsk-Zabaykalsky District in southern Transbaikal.

The snow leopard was long classified in the monotypic genus Uncia. Based on results of phylogenetic studies, it was later subordinated to the genus Panthera.

There was no evidence of recognized subspecies of snow leopard until early 2017. Results of a phylogeographic analysis indicated that there could be three distinct subspecies:

- P. u. uncia in the range countries of the Pamir Mountains
- P. u. irbis in Mongolia, and
- P. u. uncioides in the Himalayas and Qinghai.

This classification has been both contested and supported by different researchers. In the 2020s, two possible European extinct paleosubspecies–Panthera uncia pyrenaica from France and Panthera uncia lusitana from Portugal, were named but the sub-specific validity of the former is uncertain.

== Evolution ==
Two cladograms proposed for Panthera. The upper cladogram is based on two studies published in 2006 and 2009, the lower one is based on studies published in 2010 and 2011.

Based on the phylogenetic analysis of the DNA sequence sampled across the living Felidae, the snow leopard forms a sister group with the tiger (P. tigris). The genetic divergence time of this group is estimated at 4.62 to 1.82 million years ago. The snow leopard and the tiger probably diverged between 3.7 to 2.7 million years ago. Panthera originates most likely in northern Central Asia. Panthera blytheae excavated in western Tibet's Ngari Prefecture has been initially described the oldest known Panthera species and exhibits skull characteristics similar to the snow leopard, though its taxonomic placement has been disputed by other researchers who suggest that the species likely belongs to a different genus. The mitochondrial genomes of the snow leopard, the leopard and the lion (P. leo) are more similar to each other than their nuclear genomes, indicating that their ancestors hybridised at some point in their evolution.

The earliest known definitive record of the modern snow leopard is dated to the Late Pleistocene based on a specimen discovered from the Niuyan Cave of China. A Middle Pleistocene specimen from the Zhoukoudian Peking Man Site which is similar to the modern snow leopard has been referred to as P. aff. uncia. Putative fossils of the snow leopard found in the Pabbi Hills of Pakistan were dated to the Early Pleistocene, but the fossils might instead represent a leopard or belong to the genus Puma.

It has also been suggested that the snow leopard had European paleosubspecies during the Pleistocene epoch. Panthera uncia pyrenaica was described in 2022 based on fossil material found in France that was dated to the early Middle Pleistocene around 0.57 to 0.53 million years ago. Panthera uncia lusitana was described in 2025 based on fossil material discovered from Late Pleistocene strata in Portugal, and the describers of P. u. lusitana assigned P. u. pyrenaica outside the modern snow leopard as P. pyrenaica due to the lack of similar traits, though it might represent a basal related species. In the same year, Prat-Vericat and colleagues proposed that both P. u. pyrenaica and the Portuguese fossils indicate either the migration of snow leopards into Europe due to the Mid-Pleistocene Transition (the so-called "0.9 Ma Event"), or the convergent evolution of European leopards to adapt into rocky habitats that caused their resemblance to the modern snow leopard.

== Characteristics ==
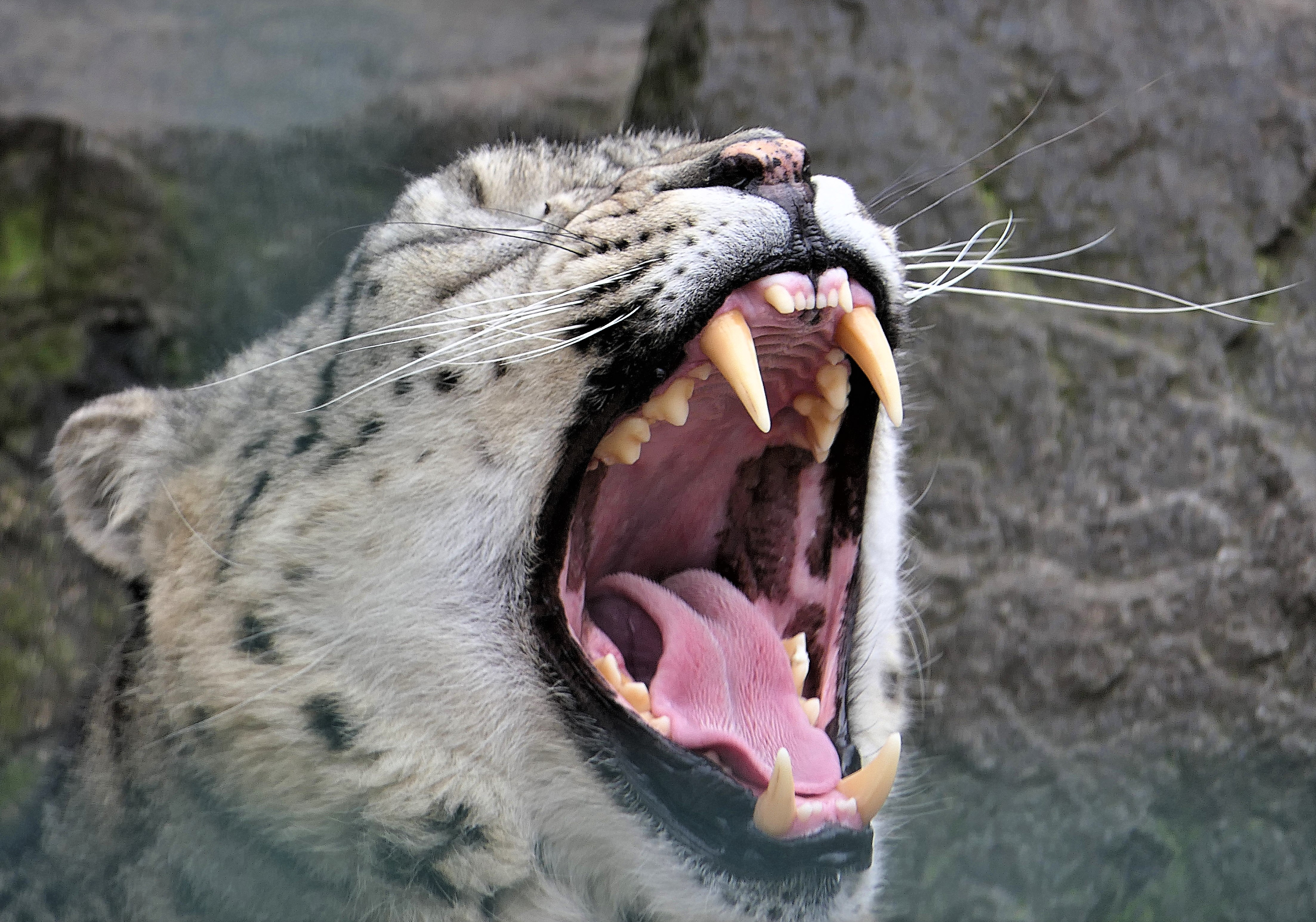
Snow leopard showing its canines

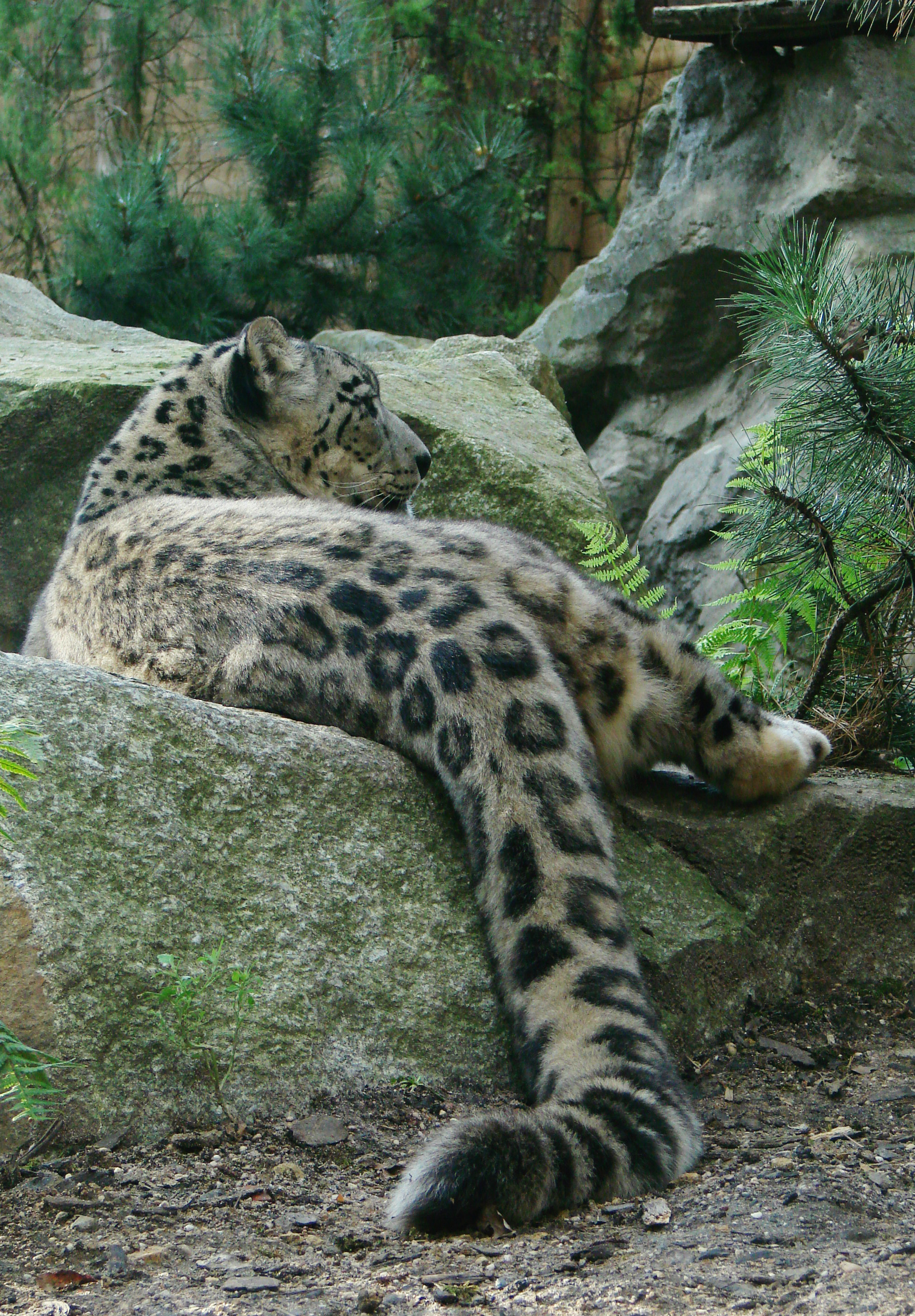
Thickly furred tail

The snow leopard's fur is whitish to grey with black spots on the head and neck, with larger rosettes on the back, flanks and bushy tail. Its muzzle is short, its forehead domed, and its nasal cavities are large. The fur is thick with hairs measuring 5 to 12 cm (2.0 to 4.7 in) in length, and its underbelly is whitish. They are stocky, short-legged, and slightly smaller than other cats of the genus Panthera, reaching a shoulder height of 56 cm (22 in), and ranging in head to body size from 75 to 150 cm (30 to 59 in). Its tail is 80 to 105 cm (31 to 41 in) long. Males average 45 to 55 kg (99 to 121 lb), and females 35 to 40 kg (77 to 88 lb); but large males reaching 75 kg (165 lb) and small females under 25 kg (55 lb) have also been recorded. Its canine teeth are 28.6 mm (1.13 in) long and are more slender than those of the other Panthera species.

The snow leopard shows several adaptations for living in cold, mountainous environments. Its small rounded ears help to minimize heat loss, and its broad paws effectively distribute the body weight for walking on snow. Fur on the undersides of the paws enhances its grip on steep and unstable surfaces, and helps to minimize heat loss. Its long and flexible tail helps the cat to balance in rocky terrain. The tail is very thick due to fat storage, and is covered in a thick layer of fur, which allows the cat to use it like a blanket to protect its face when asleep.

The snow leopard differs from the other Panthera species by a shorter muzzle, an elevated forehead, a vertical chin and a less developed posterior process of the lower jaw. Despite its partly ossified hyoid bone, a snow leopard cannot roar, as its 9 mm (0.35 in) short vocal folds provide little resistance to airflow. Its nasal openings are large in relation to the length of its skull and width of its palate; thanks to their size the volume of air inhaled with each breath is optimised, and the cold dry air becomes warmer. It is not especially adapted to high-altitude hypoxia.

== Distribution and habitat ==
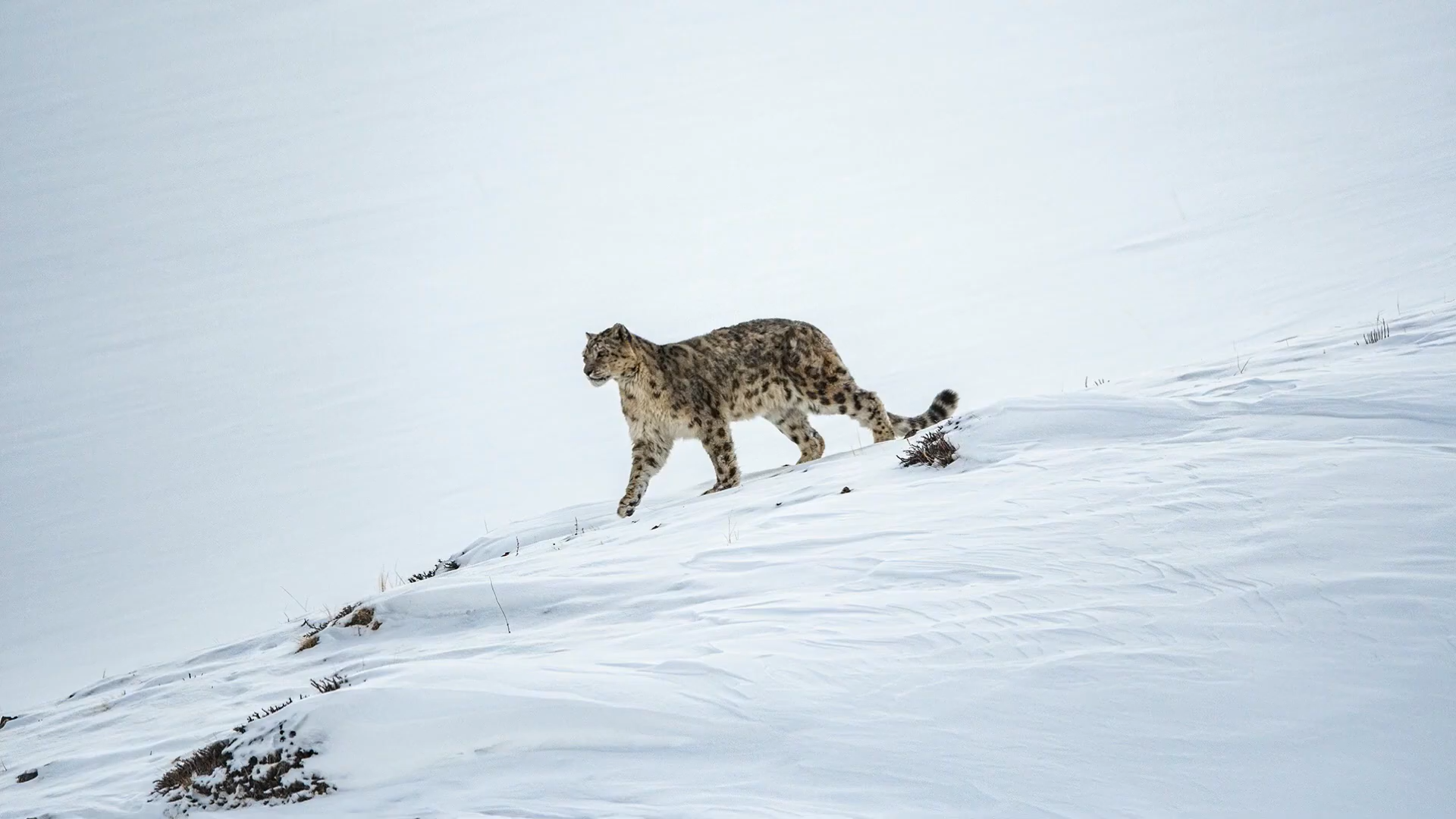
Snow leopard in Kibber Wildlife Sanctuary

The snow leopard is distributed from the west of Lake Baikal through southern Siberia, in the Kunlun Mountains, Altai Mountains, Sayan and Tannu-Ola Mountains, in the Tian Shan, through Tajikistan, Kyrgyzstan, Uzbekistan and Kazakhstan to the Hindu Kush in eastern Afghanistan, Karakoram in northern Pakistan, in the Pamir Mountains, the Tibetan Plateau and in the high elevations of the Himalayas in India, Nepal and Bhutan. In Mongolia, it inhabits the Mongolian and Gobi Altai Mountains and the Khangai Mountains. In Tibet, it occurs up to the Altyn-Tagh in the north. In northeastern Afghanistan's isolated Wakhan Corridor, it was recorded by camera traps at 16 locations.

The snow leopard inhabits alpine and subalpine zones at elevations of 3,000 to 4,500 m (9,800 to 14,800 ft), but also lives at lower elevations in the northern part of its range. In summer, it usually lives above the tree line on alpine meadows and in rocky regions at elevations of 2,700 to 6,000 m (8,900 to 19,700 ft). In winter, it descends to elevations around 1,200 to 2,000 m (3,900 to 6,600 ft). It prefers rocky, broken terrain, and can move in 85 cm (33 in) deep snow, but prefers to use existing trails made by other animals.

At the end of 2020, 35 cameras were installed on the outskirts of Almaty in Kazakhstan in hopes to catch footage of snow leopards. In November 2021, it was announced by the Russian World Wildlife Fund that snow leopards were spotted 65 times on these cameras in the Trans-Ili Alatau mountains since the cameras were installed.

Potential snow leopard habitat in the Indian Himalayas is estimated at less than 90,000 km^{2} (35,000 sq mi) in Jammu and Kashmir, Ladakh, Uttarakhand, Himachal Pradesh, Sikkim and Arunachal Pradesh, of which about 34,000 km^{2} (13,000 sq mi) is considered good habitat, and 14.4% is protected. In the beginning of the 1990s, the Indian snow leopard population was estimated at 200–600 individuals living across about 25 protected areas.

Video of a snow leopard in Ladakh

=== Population estimates ===
In 2024, the Indian snow leopard population was estimated at 718 individuals, with 124 in Uttarakhand, 51 in Himachal Pradesh, 36 in Arunachal Pradesh, 21 in Sikkim, nine in Jammu and Kashmir. As of 2024, the population in Ladakh is estimated at 380–598 individuals, with a population density ranging from about 0.2 individuals per 100 km^{2} (39 sq mi) in Changthang Wildlife Sanctuary to about two individuals per 100 km^{2} (39 sq mi) in Hemis National Park. In Himachal Pradesh, 83 adult individuals have been estimated following surveys in 2025, with a population density of 0.16–0.53 individuals per 100 km^{2} (39 sq mi).

Results of survey data from 12 sites on the Tibetan Plateau collected during 2015–2021 indicate a population density of 0.68–1.21 individuals per 100 km^{2} (39 sq mi), with 755–1,341 snow leopards estimated in an area of 360,000 km^{2} (140,000 sq mi). Results of 19 camera trapping surveys between May 2010 and August 2019 covering 13,568 km^{2} (5,239 sq mi) in the Hindu Kush, Pamir–Karakoram and Himalaya mountain ranges of Pakistan indicate an estimated mean population density of 0.10–0.24 individuals per 100 km^{2} (39 sq mi) in this region; the population is estimated to comprise 100–239 snow leopards including 96–140 individuals in the Pamir–Karakoram, 12–36 individuals in the Hindu Kush and 3–22 individuals in the Himalayas.

== Behavior and ecology ==
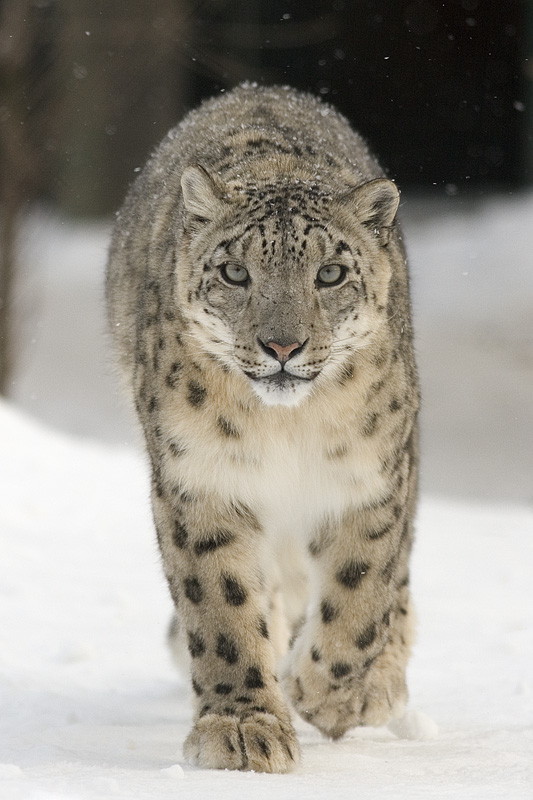
Walking on snow

The snow leopard is solitary and mostly active at dawn till early morning, and again in afternoons and early evenings. They mostly rest near cliffs and ridges that provide vantage points and shade. In Nepal's Shey Phoksundo National Park, the home ranges of five adult radio-collared snow leopards largely overlapped, though they rarely met. Their individual home ranges ranged from 12 to 39 km^{2} (4.6 to 15.1 sq mi). Males moved between 0.5 and 5.45 km (0.31 and 3.39 mi) per day, and females between 0.2 and 2.25 km (0.12 and 1.40 mi), measured in straight lines between survey points. Since they often zigzagged in the precipitous terrain, they actually moved up to 7 km (4.3 mi) in a single night. Up to 10 individuals inhabit an area of 100 km^{2} (39 sq mi); in habitats with sparse prey, an area of 1,000 km^{2} (390 sq mi) usually supports only five individuals. The snow leopard's vocalizations include meowing, grunting, prusten and moaning. It can purr when exhaling.

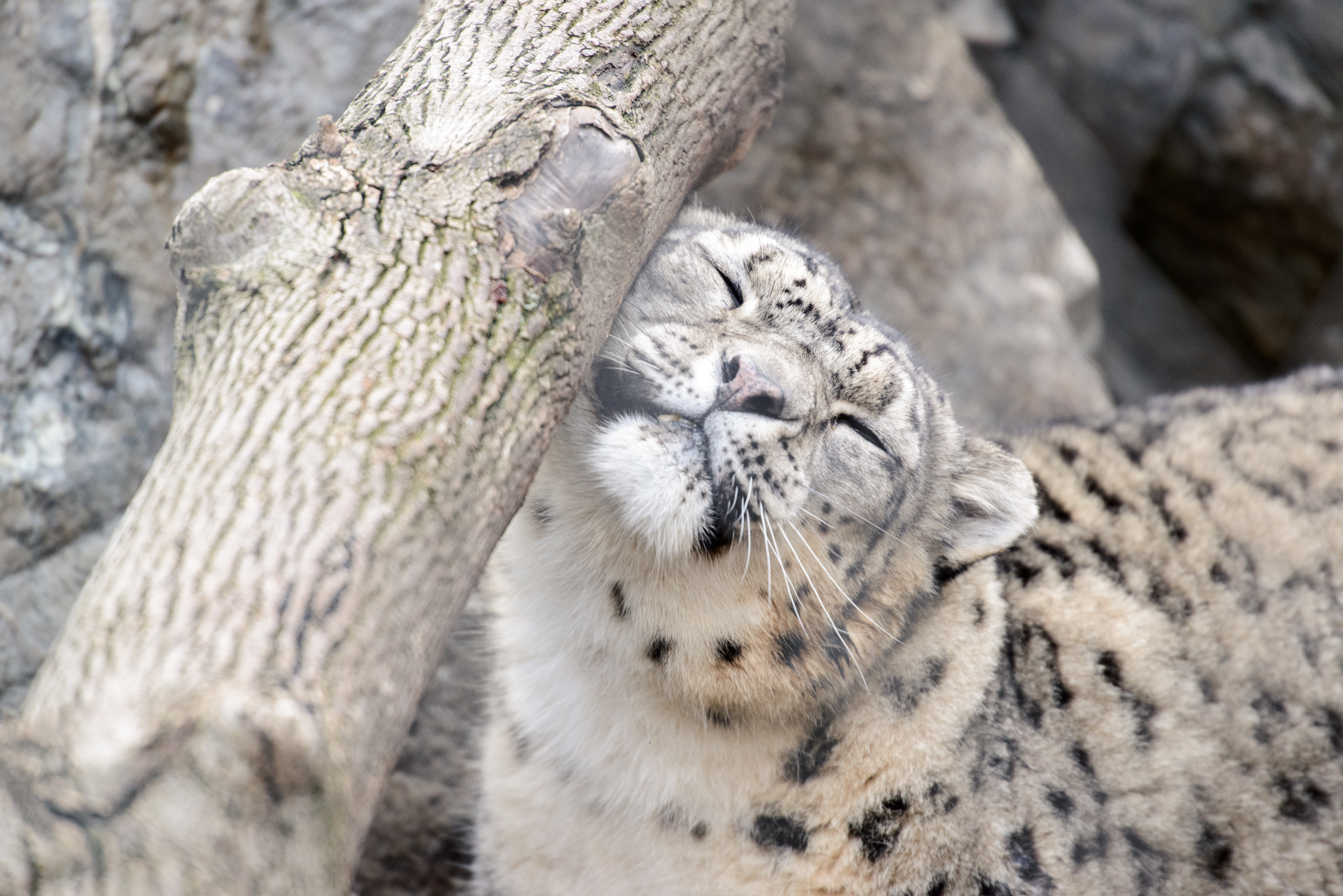
Scent rubbing

A study in the Gobi Desert from 2008 to 2014 revealed that adult males used a mean home range of 144–270 km^{2} (56–104 sq mi), while adult females ranged in areas of 83–165 km^{2} (32–64 sq mi). Their home ranges overlapped less than 20%. These results indicate that about 40% of the 170 protected areas in their range countries are smaller than the home range of a single male snow leopard.

Snow leopards leave scent marks to indicate their territories and common travel routes. They scrape the ground with the hind feet before depositing urine or feces, but also spray urine onto rocks. Their urine contains many characteristic low molecular weight compounds with diverse functional groups including pentanol, hexanol, heptanol, 3-octanone, nonanal and indole, which possibly play a role in chemical communication.

=== Hunting and diet ===
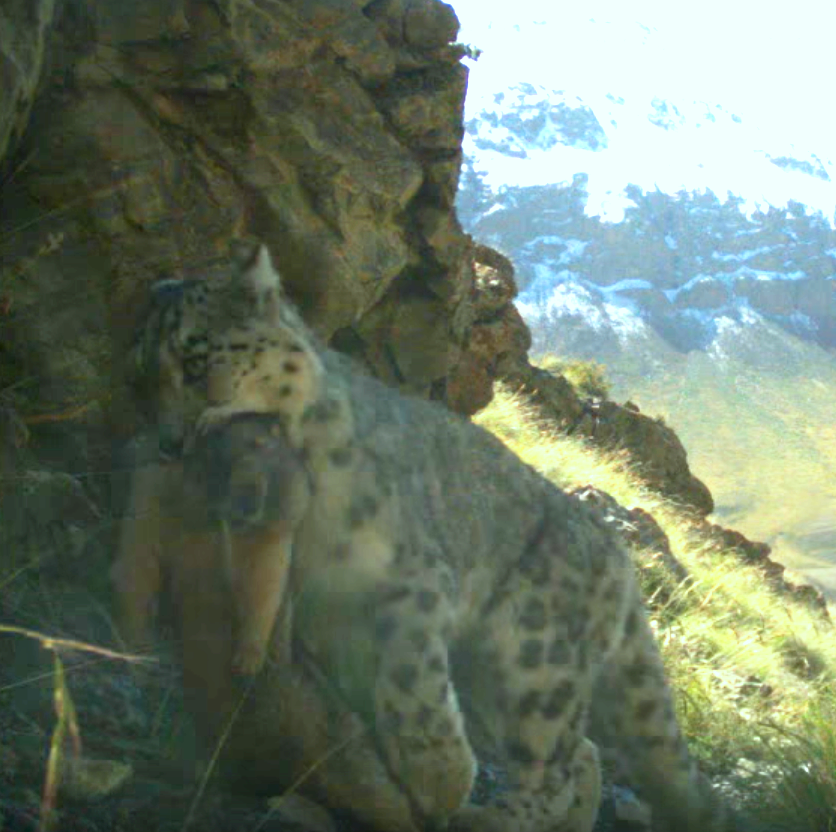
Snow leopard with a hunted gray marmot

The snow leopard is a carnivore and actively hunts its prey. Its preferred wild prey species are Himalayan blue sheep (Pseudois nayaur), Himalayan tahr (Hemitragus jemlahicus), argali (Ovis ammon), markhor (Capra falconeri) and wild goat (C. aegagrus). It also preys on domestic livestock. It prefers prey ranging in weight from 36 to 76 kg (79 to 168 lb), but also hunts smaller mammals such as Himalayan marmot (Marmota himalayana), pika and vole species. Its diet depends on prey availability and varies across its range and season. In the Himalayas, it preys mostly on Himalayan blue sheep, Siberian ibex (C. sibirica), white-bellied musk deer (Moschus leucogaster) and wild boar (Sus scrofa). In the Karakoram, Tian Shan, Altai and Mongolia's Tost Mountains, its main prey consists of Siberian ibex, Thorold's deer (Cervus albirostris), Siberian roe deer (Capreolus pygargus) and argali.

Snow leopard feces collected in northern Pakistan also contained remains of rhesus macaque (Macaca mulatta), masked palm civet (Paguma larvata), Cape hare (Lepus capensis), house mouse (Mus musculus), Kashmir field mouse (Apodemus rusiges), grey dwarf hamster (Cricetulus migratorius) and Turkestan rat (Rattus pyctoris). In 2017, a snow leopard was photographed carrying a freshly killed woolly flying squirrel (Eupetaurus cinereus) near Gangotri National Park. In Mongolia, domestic sheep comprises less than 20% of its diet, although wild prey has been reduced and interactions with people are common. It is capable of killing most ungulates in its habitat, with the probable exception of the adult male wild yak. It also eats grass and twigs.

The snow leopard actively pursues prey down steep mountainsides, using the momentum of its initial leap to chase animals for up to 300 m (980 ft). Then it drags the prey to a safe location and consumes all edible parts of the carcass. It can survive on a single Himalayan blue sheep for two weeks before hunting again, and one adult individual apparently needs 20–30 adult blue sheep per year. Snow leopards have been recorded to hunt successfully in pairs, especially mating pairs.

The snow leopard is easily driven away from livestock and readily abandons kills, often without defending itself. Only three attacks on humans have been reported, and none were fatal. In 1940, a rabid snow leopard attacked two men, and an old, toothless emaciated individual attacked a person passing by. Both incidents occurred near Almaty, Kazakh SSR. In 2026, a snow leopard mauled a tourist in Koktokay, China, who had attempted to take a photo with it.

=== Reproduction and life cycle ===
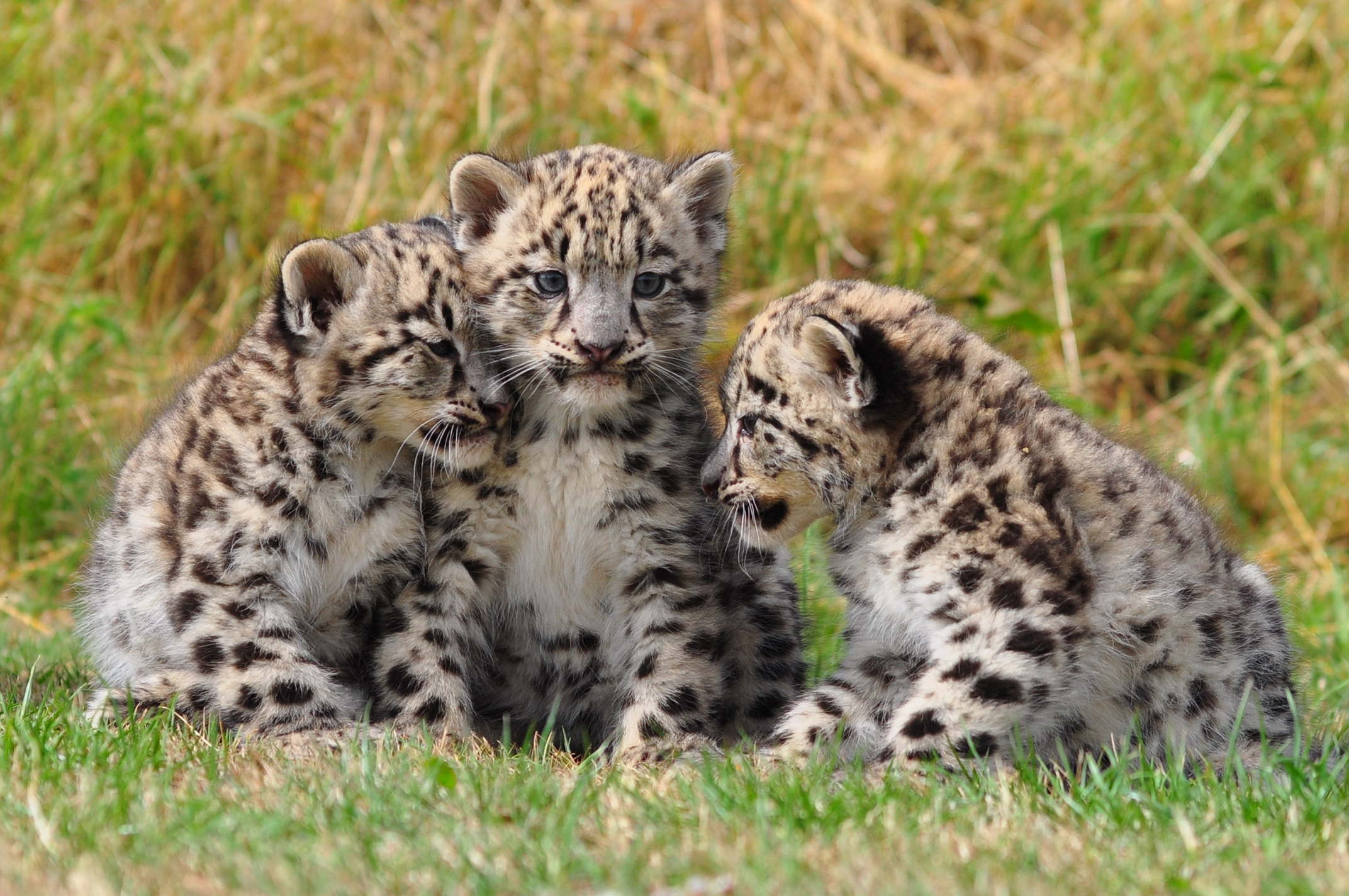
Cubs at the Cat Survival Trust in Welwyn

Snow leopards become sexually mature at two to three years, and normally live for 15–18 years in the wild. In captivity they can live for up to 25 years. Oestrus typically lasts five to eight days, and males tend not to seek out another partner after mating, probably because the short mating season does not allow sufficient time. Paired snow leopards mate in the usual felid posture, from 12 to 36 times a day. They are unusual among large cats in that they have a well-defined birth peak. They usually mate in late winter, marked by a noticeable increase in marking and calling. Females have a gestation period of 90–100 days, and the cubs are born between April and June. A litter usually consists of two to three cubs, in exceptional cases there can be up to seven.

The female gives birth in a rocky den or crevice lined with fur shed from her underside. The cubs are born blind and helpless, although already with a thick coat of fur, and weigh 320 to 567 g (11.3 to 20.0 oz). Their eyes open at around seven days, and the cubs can walk at five weeks and are fully weaned by 10 weeks. The cubs leave the den when they are around two to four months of age. Three radio-collared snow leopards in Mongolia's Tost Mountains gave birth between late April and late June. Two female cubs started to part from their mothers at the age of 20 to 21 months, but reunited with them several times for a few days over a period of 4–7 months. One male cub separated from his mother at the age of about 22 months, but stayed in her vicinity for a month and moved out of his natal range at 23 months of age. The snow leopard has a generation length of eight years.

== Threats ==
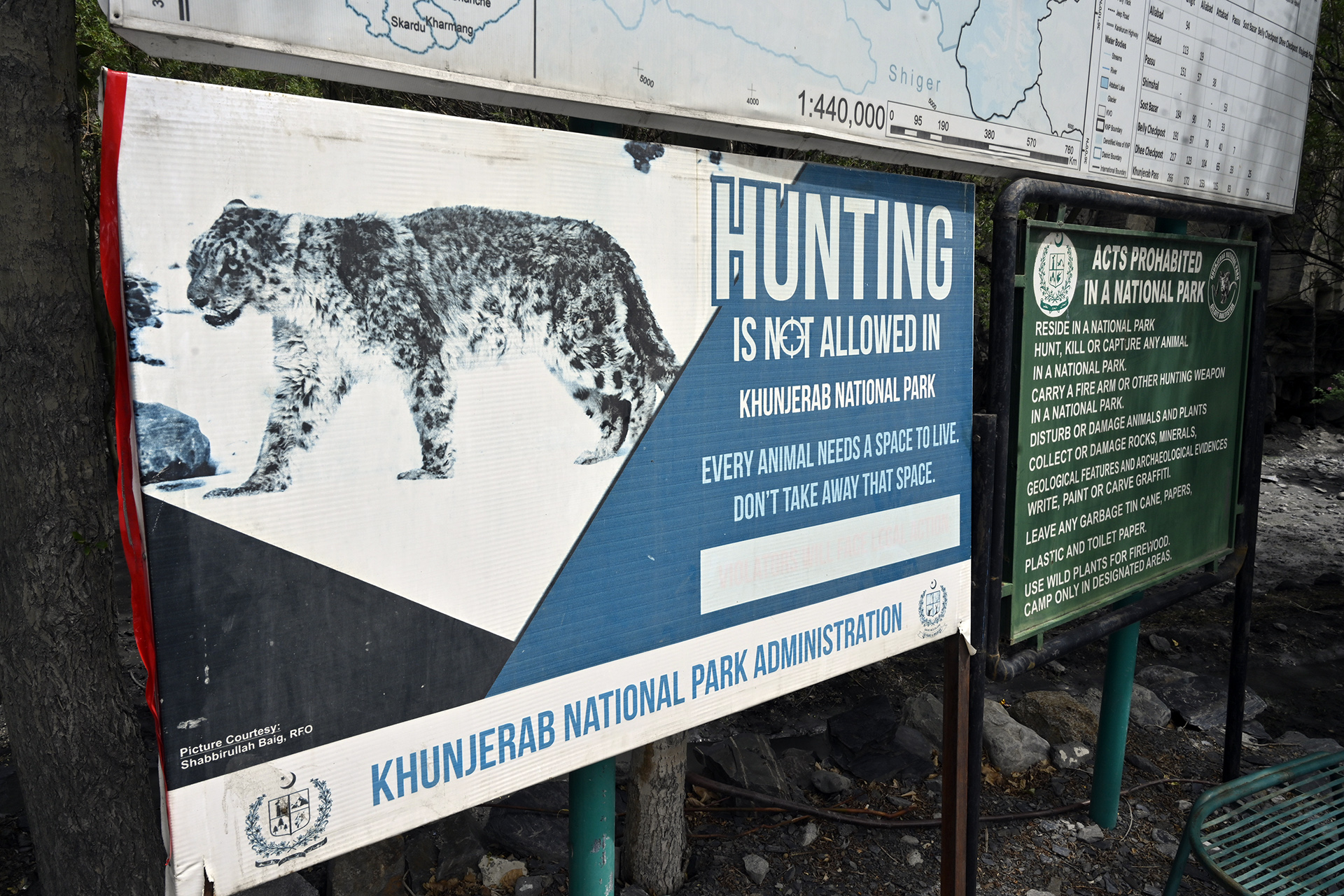
Anti-poaching sign featuring a snow leopard at Khunjerab National Park

Major threats to the population include poaching and illegal trade of its skins and body parts. Between 1999 and 2002, three live snow leopard cubs and 16 skins were confiscated, 330 traps were destroyed and 110 poachers were arrested in Kyrgyzstan. Undercover operations in the country revealed an illegal trade network with links to Russia and China via Kazakhstan. The major skin trade center in the region is the city of Kashgar in Xinjiang. In Tibet and Mongolia, skins are used for traditional dresses, and meat in traditional Tibetan medicine to cure kidney problems; bones are used in traditional Chinese and Mongolian medicine for treating rheumatism, injuries and pain of human bones and tendons. Between 1996 and 2002, 37 skins were found in wildlife markets and tourist shops in Mongolia. Between 2003 and 2016, 710 skins were traded, of which 288 skins were confiscated. In China, an estimated 103 to 236 animals are poached every year, in Mongolia between 34 and 53, in Pakistan between 23 and 53, in India from 21 to 45, and in Tajikistan 20 to 25. In 2016, a survey of Chinese websites revealed 15 advertisements for 44 snow leopard products; the dealers offered skins, canine teeth, claws and a tongue. In September 2014, nine snow leopard skins were found during a market survey in Afghanistan. As per a 2012 report, increasing Greenhouse gas emissions are expected to cause a shift of the treeline in the Himalayas and a shrinking of the alpine zone, which may reduce the snow leopard habitat by an estimated 30%.

Where snow leopards prey on domestic livestock, they are subject to human–wildlife conflict. The loss of natural prey due to overgrazing by livestock, poaching, and defense of livestock are the major drivers for the ever decreasing snow leopard population. Livestock also cause habitat degradation, which, alongside the increasing use of forests for fuel, reduces snow leopard habitat.

== Conservation ==
Global snow leopard population
Country	Year	Estimate
Afghanistan	2016	50–200
Bhutan	2023	134
China	2016	4,500
India	2024	718
Kazakhstan	2016	100–120
Kyrgyzstan	2016	300–400
Mongolia	2016	1,000
Nepal	2016	301–400
Pakistan	2016	250–420
Russia	2016	70–90
Tajikistan	2016	250–280
Uzbekistan	2016	30–120

The snow leopard is listed in CITES Appendix I. It has been listed as threatened with extinction in Schedule I of the Convention on the Conservation of Migratory Species of Wild Animals since 1985.

Hunting of the snow leopard has been prohibited in Kyrgyzstan since the 1950s. In India, it has been granted the highest level of protection under the Wildlife Protection Act, 1972, and hunting is punishable with a imprisonment of three to seven years. In Nepal, it has been legally protected since 1973, with penalties of 5–15 years in prison and a fine for poaching and trading it.

Since 1978, the snow leopard has been listed in the Soviet Union's Red Book and is still inscribed today in the Red Data Book of the Russian Federation as threatened with extinction. Hunting snow leopards is only permitted for the purposes of conservation and monitoring, and to eliminate a threat to the life of humans and livestock. Smuggling of snow leopard body parts is punishable with imprisonment and a fine. Hunting snow leopards has been prohibited in Afghanistan since 1986.

In China, the snow leopard has been protected by law since 1989; hunting it and trading its body parts constitute a criminal offence that is punishable by the confiscation of property, a fine and a sentence of at least 10 years in prison. The species has been protected in Bhutan since 1995.

In 2013, government leaders and officials from all 12 countries encompassing the snow leopard's range (Afghanistan, Bhutan, China, India, Kazakhstan, Kyrgyzstan, Mongolia, Nepal, Pakistan, Russia, Tajikistan, and Uzbekistan) and other agencies like the Snow Leopard Conservancy, the Snow Leopard Trust, the Nature and Biodiversity Conservation Union, the World Bank's Global Tiger Initiative, the United Nations Development Programme, the World Wild Fund for Nature, the United States Agency for International Development, and Global Environment Facility came together at the Global Snow Leopard Forum organized by the Government of Kyrgyzstan at Bishkek. In the meeting, it was agreed that the snow leopard and the high mountain habitat need trans-boundary support to ensure a viable future for snow leopard populations, and to safeguard its fragile environment.

=== In captivity ===
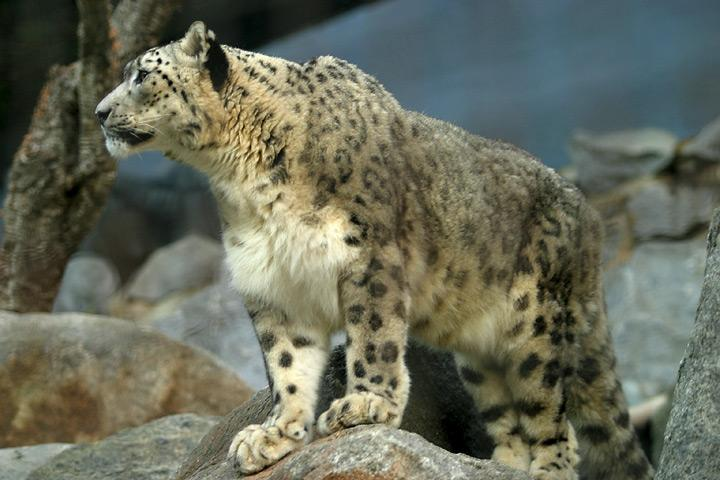
At the San Diego Zoo

The Moscow Zoo exhibited the first captive snow leopard in 1872 that had been caught in Turkestan. The Bronx Zoo housed a live snow leopard in 1903, and this was the first ever specimen exhibited in a North American zoo. The first captive bred snow leopard cubs were born in the 1990s in the Beijing Zoo.

The snow leopard Species Survival Plan was initiated in 1984, and by 1986, American zoos held 234 individuals.

== Cultural significance ==
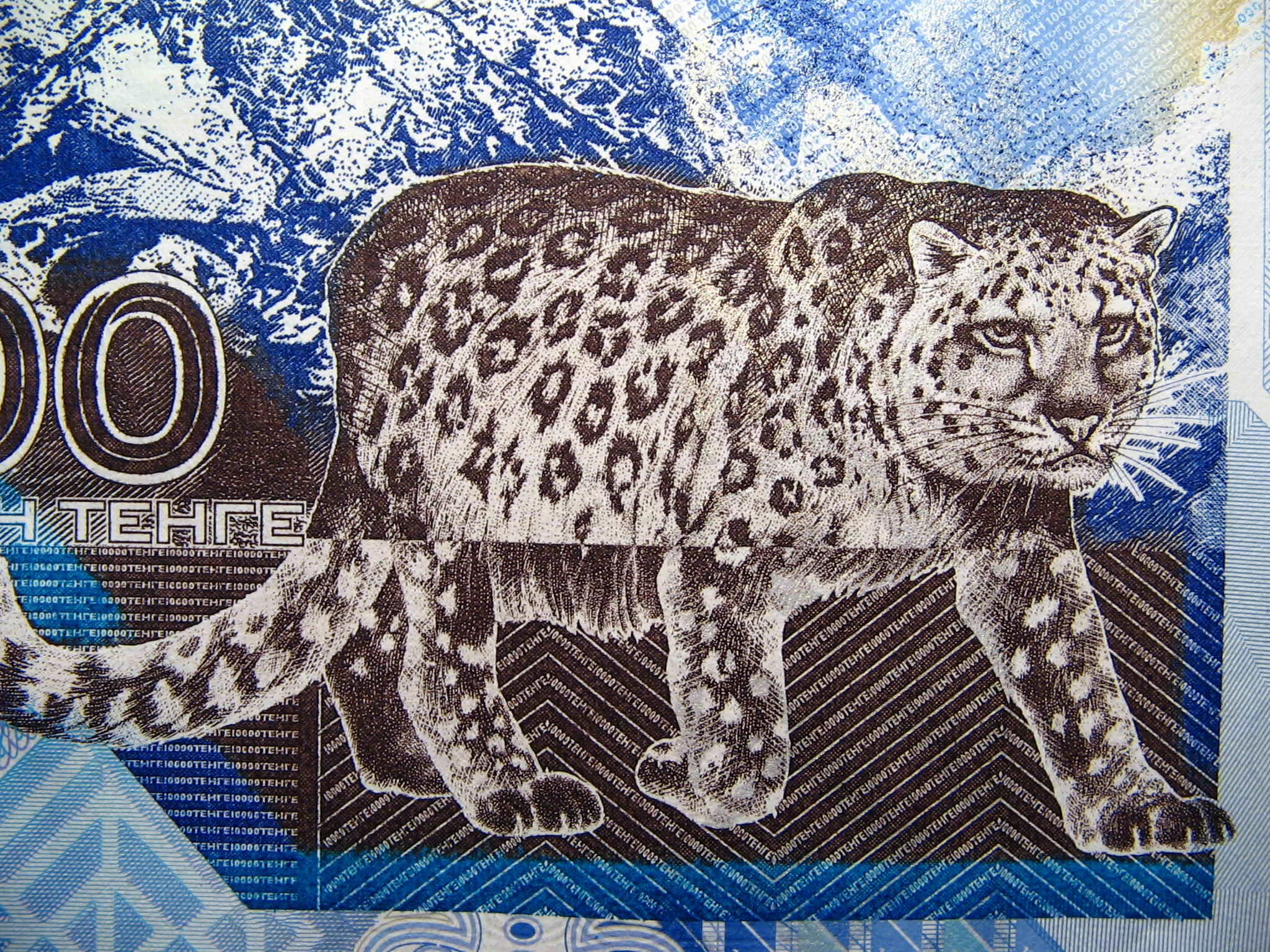
Snow leopard on the old 10,000-Kazakhstani tenge banknote

The snow leopard is widely used in heraldry and as an emblem in Central Asia. The Aq Bars ('White Leopard') is a political symbol of the Tatars, Kazakhs, and Bulgars. A mythical winged Aq Bars is depicted on the national coat of arms of Tatarstan, the seal of the city of Samarqand, Uzbekistan and the old coat of arms of Astana. A snow leopard is depicted on the official seal of Almaty and on the former 10,000 Kazakhstani tenge banknote. In Kyrgyzstan, it is used in highly stylized form in the modern emblem of the capital Bishkek, and the same art has been integrated into the badge of the Kyrgyzstan Girl Scouts Association. It is also considered to be a sacred creature by the Kyrgyz people. A crowned snow leopard features in the arms of Shushensky District in Russia. It is the state animal of Ladakh and Himachal Pradesh in India.

The 1978 book The Snow Leopard is an account by Peter Matthiessen about his two-month journey through the Dolpo region of the Nepal Himalayas in search of the snow leopard.

== See also ==
- List of largest cats
