= Kyzaizhan Seilkozhauly =

Chinese politician

Qyzaijan Seiılqojaūly
- Қызайжан Сейілқожаұлы

Vice Chairman of the Xinjiang Regional Committee of the Chinese People's Political Consultative Conference
- In office January 2008 – January 2013
- Chairman: Ashat Kerimbay

Governor of Ili Kazakh Autonomous Prefecture
- In office March 2003 – January 2008
- Party Secretary: Lin Tianxi; Zhang Guoliang; Zhang Jixun; Li Xianglin
- Preceded by: Nurlan Abilmazhinuly
- Succeeded by: Mawken Seyitqamzaüli

Governor of Tacheng Prefecture
- In office December 1996 – January 2003
- Party Secretary: Wu Qilin; Tang Dingbang
- Preceded by: Alpısbay Raxımulı
- Succeeded by: Tilepaldı Äbdiraşïd

Personal details
- Born: February 1950 (age 76) Tekes County, Xinjiang, China
- Party: Chinese Communist Party
- Education: Minzu University of China; Party School of CCP Ili Kazakh Autonomous Prefecture Committee

Chinese name
- Simplified Chinese: 柯赛江·赛力禾加
- Traditional Chinese: 柯賽江·賽力禾加
Transcriptions
Standard Mandarin
- Hanyu Pinyin: Kēsàijiāng Sàilìhéjiā

Qyzaijan Seiılqojaūly (Note: Also spelled based on the Russified Romanization Kyzaizhan Seilkozhauly) (Kazakh: قىزايجان سەيىلقوجاۇلى / Қызайжан Сейілқожаұлы; born February 1950) is a Chinese politician of Kazakh origin who served as vice chairman of the Xinjiang Regional Committee of the Chinese People's Political Consultative Conference from 2008 to 2013, governor of Ili Kazakh Autonomous Prefecture from 2003 to 2008, governor of Tacheng Prefecture from 1996 to 2003.

== Biography ==
Kyzaizhan was born in Tekes County, Xinjiang, in February 1950. He joined the Chinese Communist Party (CCP) in August 1971, and entered the workforce in August 1972. In February 1978, he entered Minzu University of China, where he graduated in March 1979.

In March 1984, he was named acting magistrate of Tekes County and was installed in July. He was director of the Land Administration Bureau of Ili Kazakh Autonomous Prefecture in September 1989, and held that office until September 1993. In December 1996, he rose to become governor of Tacheng Prefecture, he remained in that position until January 2003, when he was transferred to Ili Kazakh Autonomous Prefecture again and appointed governor. He became vice chairman of the Xinjiang Regional Committee of the Chinese People's Political Consultative Conference in January 2008, and served until January 2013.

He was a delegate to the 9th and 10th National People's Congress.

== Notes ==
Government offices
| Preceded by Alpysbai Rakhimuly | Governor of Tacheng Prefecture; 1996–2003 | Succeeded by Tilepaldı Äbdiraşïd |
| Preceded by Nurlan Abilmazhinuly | Governor of Ili Kazakh Autonomous Prefecture; 2003–2008 | Succeeded by Mawken Seyitqamzaüli |
