= Tacheng Prefecture =

Prefecture of Xinjiang, China

Coordinates: 46.75°N 82.99°E

Tacheng Prefecture: 塔城地区 (Chinese); تارباغاتاي ۋىلايىتى (Uyghur); تارباعاتاي ايماعى (Kazakh); Tarbagatay Prefecture
- Prefecture
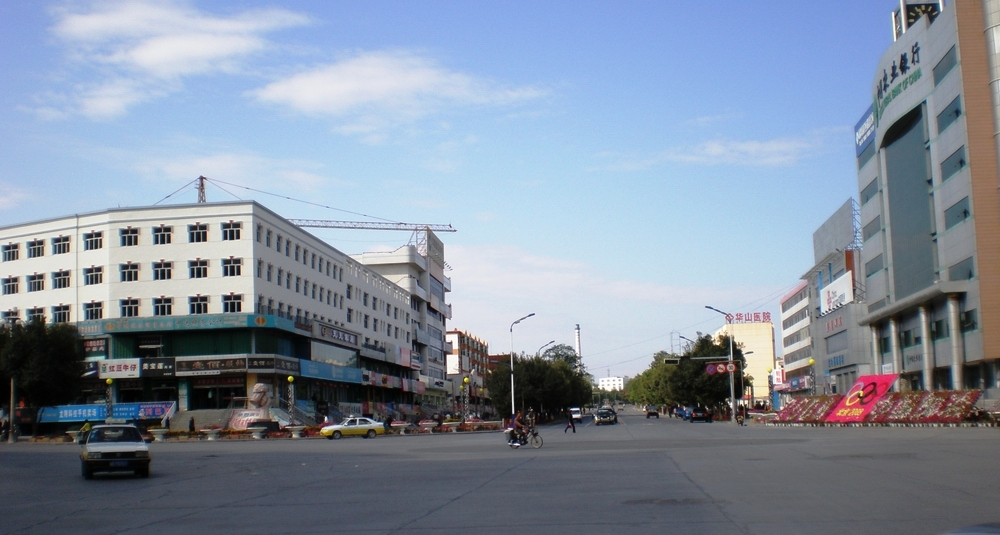
- Downtown Usu

- Tacheng prefecture (red) in Ili prefecture (light red) and Xinjiang (orange)
- Country: People's Republic of China
- Province: Xinjiang
- Sub-provincial: Ili Prefecture
- Capital: Tacheng

Area
  - Total: 98,824 km^{2} (38,156 sq mi)

Population (2020)
  - Total: 992,444
  - Density: 10.043/km^{2} (26.010/sq mi)

GDP
  - Total: CN¥ 69.7 billion US$ 10.1 billion
  - Per capita: CN¥ 54,095; US$ 7,842
- Time zone: UTC+8 (China Standard)
- ISO 3166 code: CN-XJ-42
- Website: xjtc.gov.cn

Tacheng Prefecture

Chinese name
- Simplified Chinese: 塔城地区
- Traditional Chinese: 塔城地區
Transcriptions
Standard Mandarin
- Hanyu Pinyin: Tǎchéng Dìqū
- Wade–Giles: T'a^{3}-ch'eng^{2} Ti^{4}-ch'ü^{1}
- IPA: [tʰàʈʂʰə̌ŋ tîtɕʰý]
other Mandarin
- Xiao'erjing: تَاچٍْ دِکِیُوِ

Alternative Chinese name
- Simplified Chinese: 塔尔巴哈台地区
- Traditional Chinese: 塔爾巴哈台地區
Transcriptions
Standard Mandarin
- Hanyu Pinyin: Tǎ'ěrbāhātái Dìqū
other Mandarin
- Xiao'erjing: تَاعَربَاحَاتَیْ دِکِیُوِ

Mongolian name
- Mongolian Cyrillic: Тарвагатай тойрог
- Mongolian script: ᠲᠠᠷᠪᠠᠭᠠᠲᠠᠢ ᠲᠣᠭᠤᠷᠢᠭ
Transcriptions
- SASM/GNC: Tarbagatai tôirôg

Uyghur name
- Uyghur: تارباغاتاي ۋىلايىتى
Transcriptions
- Latin Yëziqi: Tarbaghatay wilayiti
- Yengi Yeziⱪ: Tarbaƣatay wilayiti
- SASM/GNC: Tarbagatai wilayiti
- Siril Yëziqi: Тарбағатай вилайити
- Uyghur IPA: [tʰɑɾb̥ɑʁɑˈtʰɑj ʋɪɫɑjɪˈtʰɪ]

Kazakh name
- Kazakh: تارباعاتاي ايماعى; Тарбағатай аймағы Tarbağatai aimağy [tʰɑɾb̥ɑʁɑtʰɑ́j ɑjmɑʁə́]

Tacheng Prefecture, (Note: Chinese: 塔城地区; pinyin: Tǎchéng Dìqū) also known as Tarbagatay Prefecture, (Note: Chinese: 塔尔巴哈台地区; pinyin: Tǎ'ěrbāhātái Dìqū; Uyghur: تارباغاتاي ۋىلايىتى, romanized: Tarbaghatay wilayiti; Kazakh: تارباعاتاي ايماعى, romanized: Tarbağatai aimağy) is located in northern Xinjiang, People's Republic of China. It has an area of 98,824 km^{2} (38,156 sq mi) and a population of 992,444 (2020). It is a part of Ili Kazakh Autonomous Prefecture. The prefecture level city of Karamay forms a separate enclave in the middle of Tacheng.

== Subdivisions ==
Tacheng prefecture is divided into 3 county level cities, 3 counties, and 1 autonomous county.

#	Name	Hanzi	Hanyu Pinyin	Uyghur (UEY)	Uyghur Latin (ULY)	Kazakh (Arabic script)	Kazakh Latin transcription	Population (2020 Census)	Area (km^{2})	Density (/km^{2})
1	Tacheng City	塔城市	Tǎchéng Shì	چۆچەك شەھىرى	Chöchek Shehiri	شاۋەشەك قالاسى	Sháýeshek qalasy	158,098	3,992	39.60
2	Usu City	乌苏市	Wūsū Shì	شىخۇ شەھىرى	Shixu Shehiri	شيحۋ قالاسى	Shıhý qalasy	262,906	14,394	18.26
3	Shawan City	沙湾市	Shāwān Shì	ساۋەن شەھىرى	Saven Shehiri	ساۋان قالاسى	Saýan qalasy	301,046	12,458	24.16
4	Emin County	额敏县	Émǐn Xiàn	دۆربىلجىن ناھىيىسى	Dörbiljin Nahiyisi	ءدوربىلجىن اۋدانى	Dórbiljin aýdany	188,642	9,158	20.60
5	Toli County	托里县	Tuōlǐ Xiàn	تولى ناھىيىسى	Toli Nahiyisi	تولى اۋدانى	Toly aýdany	85,451	19,982	4.28
6	Yumin County	裕民县	Yùmín Xiàn	چاغانتوقاي ناھىيىسى	Chaghantoqay Nahiyisi	شاعانتوعاي اۋدانى	Shaǵantoǵaı aýdany	50,819	6,102	8.33
7	Hoboksar Mongol Autonomous County	和布克赛尔蒙古自治县	Hébùkèsài'ěr Měnggǔ Zìzhìxiàn	قوبۇقسار موڭغۇل ئاپتونوم ناھىيىسى	Qobuqsar Mongghul Aptonom Nahiyisi	قوبىقسارى موڭعۇل اۆتونوميالىق اۋدانى	Qobyqsary Mońǵul avtonomıaly aýdany	61,785	28,783	2.15

== Demographics ==
Breakdown of nationalities in Tacheng Prefecture
Nationality	Percentage
Han	54.7%
Kazakhs	26.7%
Huis	8.5%
Uyghurs	4.3%
Mongols	3.4%
Daurs	0.5%
Russians	0.3%
Others	1.6%
Source of the population statistics :

== Geography ==
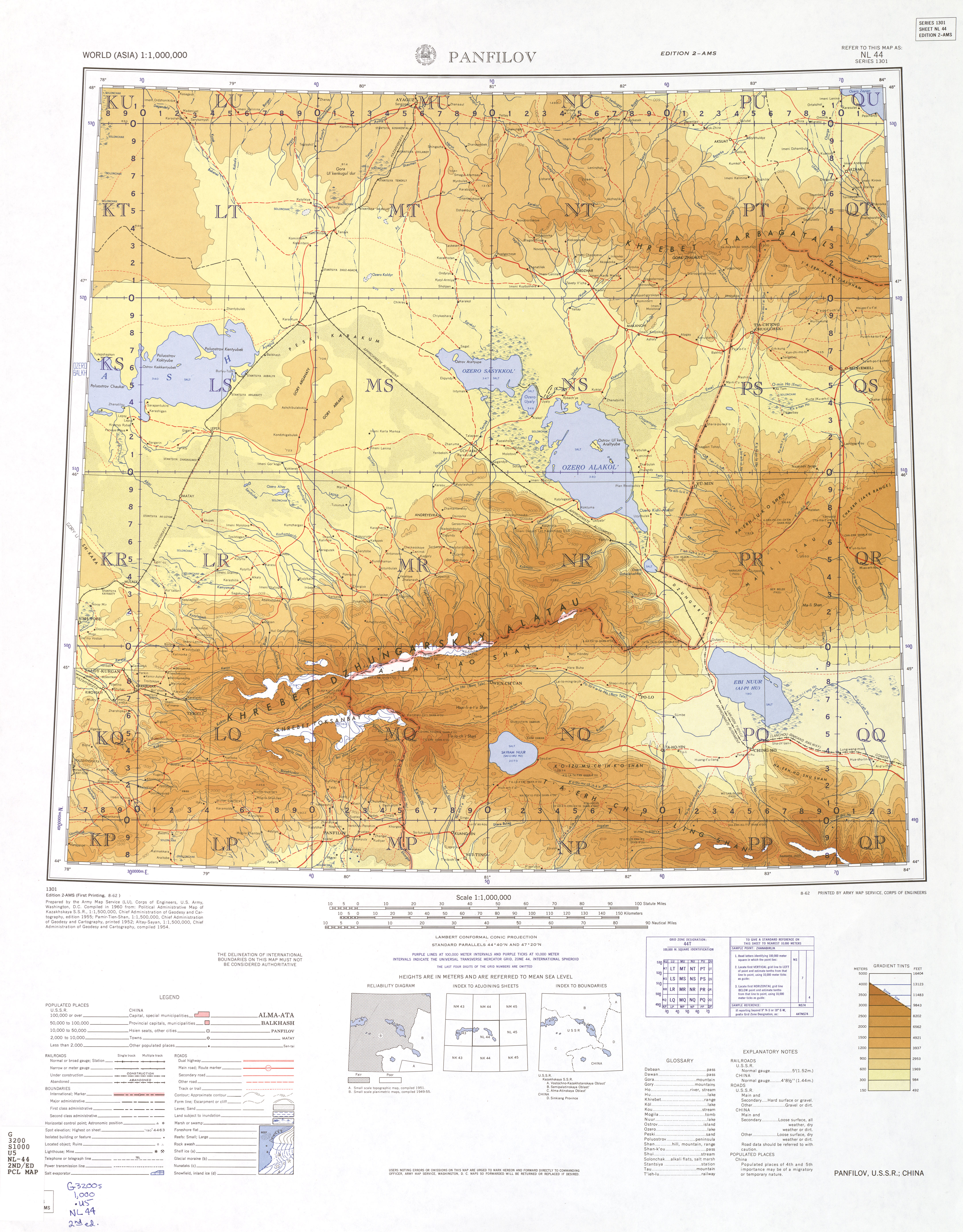
Map of Tacheng (labeled as T'A-CH'ENG (CHUGUCHAK)) in the International Map of the World (1960)

See Emin Valley, Tarbagatai Mountains, Saur Mountains, Gurbantünggüt Desert.

== Heads ==
=== Secretary ===
1. Li Fengzi – ? – May 1991
2. Li Guimao – Jun. 1991 – Jul. 1994
3. Wu Qilin – Jul. 1994 – Apr. 2000
4. Tang Dingbang – Apr. 2000 – Nov. 2004
5. Peng Jiarui – Nov. 2004 – Jul. 2011
6. Zhang Bo – Jul. 2011 – Jan. 2015
7. Xue Bin – since Mar. 2017 (薛斌)

=== Governors ===
1. Baspaı Sholaquly (Баспай Шолақұлы) – 1945–1952
2. Arystanbek (Арыстанбек) (阿尔斯坦别克) – 1983 – Jun. 1993
3. Alpısbaý Raxımulı – Jun. 1993 – Jan. 1997
4. Qızaýjan Seýilqojaulı – Dec. 1996 – Jan. 2003
5. Tilepaldı Äbdiraşïd – Jan. 2003 – Jan. 2008
6. Mänen Zeýnelulı – Jan. 2008 – Apr. 2012
7. Aqanulı Sarqıt – Apr. 2012 – Jun. 2016
8. Muqïyat Jarmuqamet (木合亚提·加尔木哈买提) – since Jun. 2016
9. Aydyn Toleuhan since 2021
