= Sub-provincial division =

Chinese government subdivisions

Strictly speaking, China's legal system neither recognizes the concept of "sub-provincial administrative divisions" (Chinese: 副省级行政区; pinyin: Fùshěngjí xíngzhèngqū) or "sub-provincial cities" (Chinese: 副省级城市; pinyin: Fùshěngjí chéngshì) nor provides specific legislation for such designations, and these categories are absent from official statistical classifications. The so-called sub-provincial divisions or sub-provincial cities refer to special administrative status granted to selected prefecture-level cities during specific historical periods. This status is operationally defined by appointing deputy provincial-level (deputy ministerial-level) officials as the top leaders of municipal party and government organs. Correspondingly, institutional heads under these jurisdictions hold ranks half a grade higher than their counterparts in regular prefecture-level administrative divisions – specifically, party and government department leaders are designated as deputy departmental-level officials.

China has 15 sub-provincial cities, including Dalian, Qingdao, Ningbo, Xiamen and Shenzhen and 5 separately planned cities (Chinese: 计划单列市). Additionally, the Ili Kazakh Autonomous Prefecture in Xinjiang holds sub-provincial autonomous prefecture (Chinese: 副省级自治州; pinyin: Fùshěngjí zìzhìzhōu), governing three administrative prefectures: the directly-administered counties and cities under Ili Prefecture, this refers specifically to the core jurisdictional area of Ili Profecture in its narrow administrative sense and also the administrative division-based statistical scope of the Ili Kazakh Autonomous Prefecture, and Tacheng (Tarbagatay) Prefecture and Altay Prefecture.

== Separately planned city ==
A separately planned city (Chinese: 计划单列市) is not a Chinese administrative division concept. Administratively, they remain under the jurisdiction of provinces, but they enjoy certain independent authority in economic planning, fiscal management, and other areas, operating directly under the leadership and management of relevant national ministries and commissions. This institutional arrangement aims to enhance these cities' leading role in economic development and promote coordinated regional economic growth. The existence and operation of separately planned cities are primarily reflected in national administrative management practices rather than explicit legal statutes. While not directly defined by national policies, their establishment and functioning are profoundly shaped by state policy. Through policy guidance and administrative practices, the central government grants these cities special economic and managerial privileges to accelerate their development and drive progress in surrounding regions. Simultaneously, Separately planned cities actively align with national strategies, formulating and implementing tailored economic and social development plans based on local conditions. Ultimately, they represent a unique mechanism within China's administrative system, deeply influenced by and responsive to national policy objectives. By 1994, the original 14 separately planned cities, along with Hangzhou and Jinan, were designated as sub-provincial cities, forming a total of 16 such cities. Following Chongqing's elevation to a municipality directly under the central government in 1997, only five cities—Dalian, Qingdao, Ningbo, Xiamen, and Shenzhen—currently retain their status as separately planned cities.

=== History ===
"Separately planned cities (Chinese: 计划单列市)," officially known as "national social and economic development separately planned cities (Chinese: 国家社会与经济发展计划单列市)," refers to province-administered cities that retain their original administrative structure while being incorporated into the national planning system, thereby acquiring provincial-level economic management authority. Literally, "separate planning" (Chinese: 计划单列) signifies that within the state planning system, when formulating production targets, resource allocation, and consumption quotas for designated regions, Chinese central government transcends existing administrative hierarchies to establish independent planning accounts and allocate dedicated planning indicators to these areas. Since the state's resource allocation and distribution primarily targets provincial-level administrative units (provinces, autonomous regions, and municipalities), the authorization of independent planning authority to sub-provincial entities – typically prefecture-level cities – institutionalized the "separately planned cities" designation.

Separately planned cities hold sub-provincial administrative status in the political hierarchy, with institutions like the Shenzhen Municipal Committee of the Chinese Communist Party and Shenzhen Municipal People's Government operating at the sub-provincial administrative ranking. Economically, these cities function with provincial/ministerial-level authority, coordinating fiscal matters directly with the central government while bypassing provincial oversight. Key central agencies maintain special representative offices in these cities, notably exemplified by the Ministry of Commerce Commissioner's Office in Qingdao, the China Securities Regulatory Commission Dalian Bureau, and the National Financial Regulatory Administration Ningbo Bureau. In non-political domains, separately planned cities historically enjoyed unique privileges. Prior to 1994, their football associations held equal membership status with provincial counterparts in the Chinese Football Association, entitled to field teams in the China Champions League—a right denied to Hangzhou and Jinan even after their elevation to sub-provincial status in 1994.

In the early 1950s, to meet the economic development needs of the newly established People's Republic, China first implemented the "separately planned city" system in selected province-administered major cities, granting them provincial-level economic management authority. Following the abolition of regional administrative bureaus in 1954, former regional hub cities—Shenyang, Wuhan, Guangzhou, Chongqing, and Xi'an—though downgraded to province-administered cities, retained their separately planned status under dual central-provincial leadership. These cities' economic plans were directly integrated into national economic balancing, with key industries managed by central ministries, while municipal planning authorities gained independent participation rights in national planning conferences, ensuring effective implementation of the 156 key industrial projects under the First Five-Year Plan (1953–1957). By 1958, adjustments to the central planning system led to the termination of the separately planned policy, with provincial governments assuming full control over municipal economic planning—solidifying a province-centric planning model.

In the early 1960s, in response to the chaos caused by the "Great Leap Forward", the Chinese government strengthened centralized and unified management over key central cities. It reinstated the "separately planned" status of six major provincially-administered cities—Shenyang, Wuhan, Guangzhou, Chongqing, Xi'an, and Harbin—with the policy in effect from 1964 to 1968. The second phase of the separately planned policy implemented dual leadership under both the central government and provincial authorities, with provinces taking the primary role. Eight key areas, including industrial production, capital construction, and resource allocation, were incorporated into the national plan. However, in economic, scientific, technological, and social affairs, these cities remained under the coordinated management of their respective provinces, with limited autonomy in self-governance. To support urban development, the state introduced policies such as allowing municipal state-owned enterprises to retain depreciation fees and allocating funds for fixed-asset renewal. Despite its limited scope and incomplete devolution of decision-making authority, the policy played a positive role in the economic recovery and development of these major cities.

In 1983, Chongqing became the first city officially designated as a separately planned municipality. By 1984, Wuhan, Shenyang, and Dalian had successively acquired this special status. The same year, Chinese government tightened restrictions on the program, permitting only provincial capital cities like Harbin, Guangzhou, and Xi'an to be restored to the list. However, beginning in 1986, economically pivotal cities including Qingdao, Ningbo, Xiamen, and Shenzhen gradually secured approval. In 1989, Nanjing, Chengdu, and Changchun were incorporated as the final cohort, with the central government mandating explicit mechanisms to coordinate provincial-municipal fiscal relations and prevent revenue erosion. This brought the total to 14 nationally designated separately planned cities, marking the transition to a comprehensive deepening phase in China's urban economic restructuring.

=== Sub-provincial city ===
In the early 1990s, the establishment of China's socialist market economy system triggered the functional transition of separately planned cities toward sub-provincial city (Chinese: 副省级城市) status. In 1993, to align with market-oriented reforms, the central government phased out the separately planned status for all provincial capitals except Chongqing, Shenzhen, Dalian, Qingdao, Ningbo, and Xiamen, reducing the national total from 14 to 6. The following year (1994), the central authority formally designated 16 sub-provincial cities—comprising the original 14 separately planned cities plus Hangzhou and Jinan—to mitigate jurisdictional disputes between provinces and cities while strengthening provincial coordination. By allowing these cities to retain certain administrative privileges, this institutional redesign amplified their economic multiplier effects as regional growth engines. In 1997, Chongqing's elevation to a municipality directly under the central government automatically nullified its separately planned status, leaving only five cities—Dalian, Qingdao, Ningbo, Xiamen, and Shenzhen—retaining this dual-status framework to date.

While the separately planned city system represents an experimental approach in China's urban reform efforts, it has drawn significant criticism. Critics argue that this institutional framework has outlived its relevance and propose abolishing it in favor of a unified provincial tax-sharing system for municipalities. The system violates the principle of equal competition in a market economy by granting designated cities "privileged status", creating unfair competition among major cities and weakening the initiative of non-designated cities. As separately planned cities gain administrative independence from provincial planning, their economic interests gradually decouple from provincial priorities, complicating resource allocation and productivity distribution within regions and hindering regional economic integration. Moreover, this structure contradicts the direction of economic institutional reforms, expanding the central government's direct oversight and reviving issues of excessive centralization. Additionally, the system undermines standardized tax-sharing mechanisms, blurring the division of fiscal authority and administrative responsibilities between these cities and their superior governments.

== Map of sub-provincial level entries in China ==
Map of Sub-provincial level entries in China
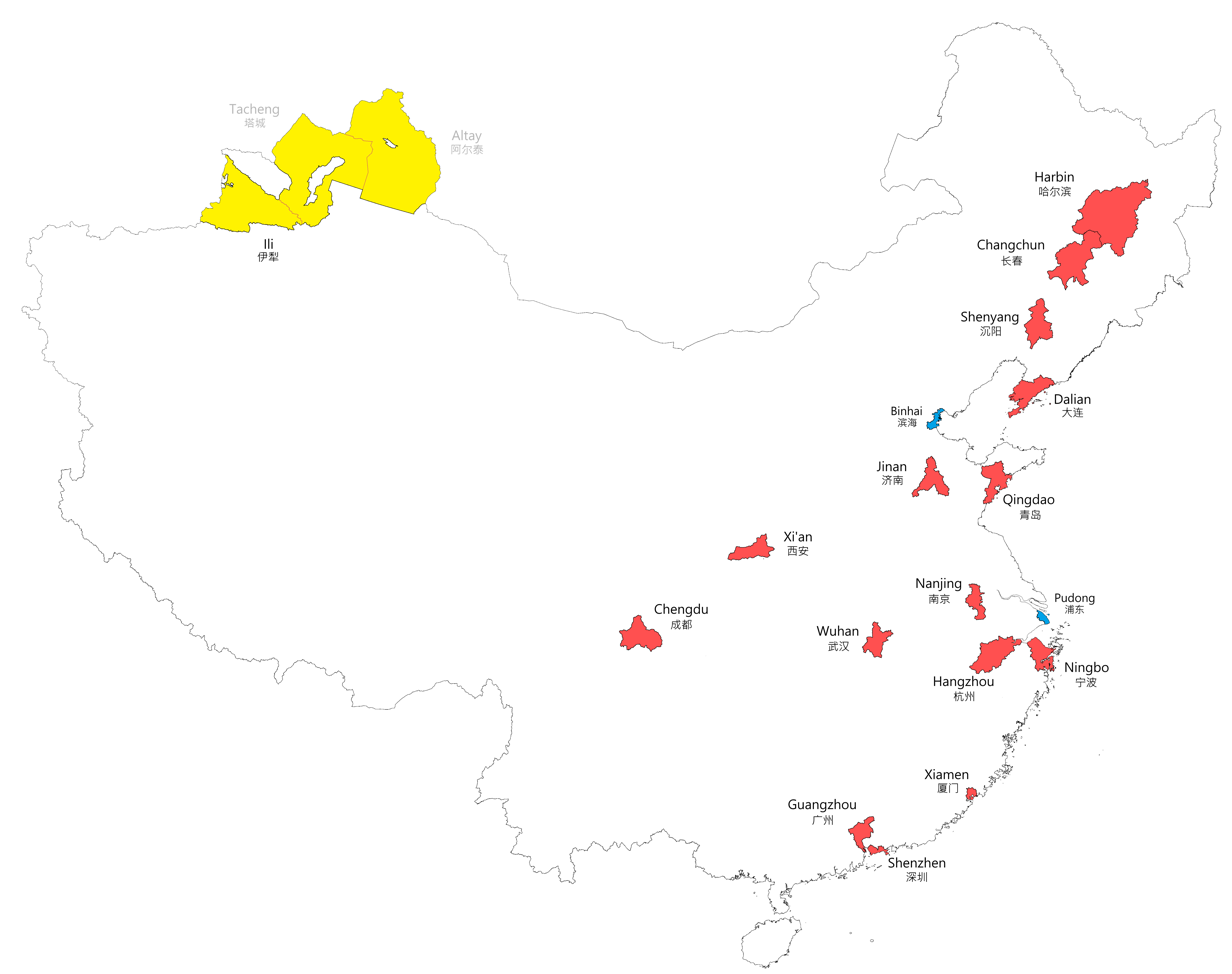

=== Sub-provincial municipalities ===
The original 16 municipalities were renamed as the sub-provincial municipalities on 25 February 1994 by the Central Organization Committee out of the prefecture-level municipalities. They are mostly the capitals of the provinces in which they are located.

Currently, there are 15 sub-provincial municipalities after Chongqing was designated direct-control:

Sub-provincial municipalities of China
Division name	Simplified Chinese	Hanyu Pinyin	Province	Abbreviation	Region	Population (2010 Census)	Date of designation	Subdivision
Changchun	长春市	Chángchūn	Jilin	长	Northeast	7,677,089	1989-02-11	7 districts, 2 county municipalities & 1 county
Chengdu	成都市	Chéngdū	Sichuan	蓉	Southwest	14,047,625	1989-02-11	11 districts, 4 county municipalities & 5 counties
Dalian	大连市	Dàlián	Liaoning	连（鲲）	Northeast	6,690,432	1984-07-13	7 districts, 2 county municipalities & 1 county
Guangzhou	广州市	Guǎngzhōu	Guangdong	穗	South Central	12,700,800	1984-10-05	11 districts
Hangzhou	杭州市	Hángzhōu	Zhejiang	杭	East	8,700,400	1994-02-25	10 districts, 1 county municipality & 2 counties
Harbin	哈尔滨市	Hā'ěrbīn	Heilongjiang	哈	Northeast	10,635,971	1984-10-05	9 districts, 2 county municipalities & 7 counties
Jinan	济南市	Jǐnán	Shandong	济	East	6,814,000	1994-02-25	7 districts & 3 counties
Nanjing	南京市	Nánjīng	Jiangsu	宁	East	8,001,680	1989-02-11	11 districts
Ningbo	宁波市	Níngbō	Zhejiang	甬	East	7,605,689	1987-02-24	6 districts, 2 county municipalities & 2 counties
Qingdao	青岛市	Qīngdǎo	Shandong	胶	East	8,715,100	1986-10-15	7 districts & 3 county municipalities
Shenyang	沈阳市	Shěnyáng	Liaoning	沈	Northeast	8,106,171	1984-07-11	10 districts, 1 county municipality & 2 counties
Shenzhen	深圳市	Shēnzhèn	Guangdong	深（鹏）	South Central	10,357,938	1988-10-03	8 districts (4 new districts)
Wuhan	武汉市	Wǔhàn	Hubei	汉	South Central	9,785,392	1984-05-21	13 districts
Xi'an	西安市	Xī'ān	Shaanxi	镐	Northwest	8,467,837	1984-10-05	11 districts & 2 counties
Xiamen	厦门市	Xiàmén	Fujian	鹭	East	3,531,347	1988-04-18	6 districts

Chongqing was formerly a sub-provincial municipality of Sichuan until 14 March 1997, when it was made an independent municipality by splitting it out of Sichuan altogether. The Xinjiang Production and Construction Corps also has the powers of a sub-provincial division.

Chengdu is the largest sub-provincial municipality. It has a population exceeding that of the independent municipality of Tianjin while both Harbin and Chengdu have a bigger land area than Tianjin.

In total, there are five sub-provincial municipalities that are not themselves provincial capitals. These five municipalities have been designated as the "Municipalities with Independent Planning Status" (simplified Chinese: 计划单列市; traditional Chinese: 計劃單列市; pinyin: Jìhuá Dānliè Shì).

=== Sub-provincial new areas ===
Additionally, the head of Pudong New Area of Shanghai and Binhai New Area of Tianjin, which is a county-level district, is given sub-provincial powers.

Sub-provincial districts of China
Division name	Simplified Chinese	Hanyu Pinyin	Municipality	Abbreviation	Region	Population (2010 Census)	Date of designation	Subdivision
Binhai New Area	滨海新区	Bīnhǎi Xīn Qū	Tianjin	滨海	North	2,482,065	2009	19 Subdistricts & 7 towns (11 special township-level zones)
Pudong New Area	浦东新区	Pǔdōng Xīn Qū	Shanghai	浦东	East	5,044,430	1992	13 Subdistricts & 25 towns (6 special township-level zones)

=== Sub-provincial autonomous prefecture ===
Ili Kazakh Autonomous Prefecture has the two prefectures of Altai and Tacheng and 11 directly-controlled county-level administrative divisions under its jurisdiction. It itself is legally only a prefecture-level division, which is a special case in China's administrative divisions. It is not accurate to regard Ili Kazakh Autonomous Region as a sub-provincial administrative division, which has no legal basis. Up until 2001, the Autonomous Prefecture had a 3rd prefecture as well. The directly controlled subdivisions were administered as part of Ili Prefecture (伊犁地区)

Sub-provincial autonomous prefecture of China
Division name	Simplified Chinese	Hanyu Pinyin	Province	Abbreviation	Region	Population (2010 Census)	Date of designation	Subdivision
Ili Kazakh Autonomous Prefecture	伊犁哈萨克自治州	Yīlí Hāsàkè Zìzhìzhōu	Xinjiang	伊犁	Northwest	4,305,119	1979	(2 prefectures) 5 county cities, 17 counties & 2 autonomous counties

== Sub-provincial Municipal Conference ==
The National Joint Conference of Sub-provincial City People's Congress Standing Committee Chairpersons (全国副省级城市人大常委会主任联席会议) are attended by the chairpersons and vice-chairpersons of all sub-provincial cities. It was proposed by the Guangzhou Municipal People's Congress in 1985. The conferences:

1. Guangzhou (26 February – 4 March 1985)
2. Harbin (27–31 August 1985)
3. Wuhan (20–24 May 1986)
4. Dalian (10–14 August 1987)
5. Xi'an (9–13 September 1988)
6. Shenyang (13–17 August 1990)
7. Chongqing (22–26 November 1991)
8. Qingdao (3–7 May 1992)
9. Shenzhen (25–28 October 1993)
10. Nanjing (1–4 November 1994)
11. Changchun (21–24 May 1995)
12. Hangzhou (20–24 October 1996)
13. Jinan (19–25 October 1997)
14. Xiamen (12–16 October 1998)
15. Ningbo (17–20 October 1999)
16. Chengdu (10–13 October 2000)
17. Guangzhou (30 October – 3 November 2001)
18. Harbin (23–26 July 2002)
19. Wuhan (8–12 October 2003)
20. Shenyang (31 August – 6 September 2004)
21. Qingdao (6–8 September 2005)
22. Shenzhen (20–23 October 2006)
23. Dalian (14–16 August 2007)
24. Xi'an (13–16 April 2009)
25. Nanjing (18–20 October 2010)
26. Changchun (22–25 August 2011)
