= Koktokay =

Town in Northern Xinjiang, China

Coordinates: 47°12′51″N 89°48′49″E

Koktokay (Chinese: 可可托海; pinyin: Kěkětuōhǎi; Wade–Giles: Kʻo-kʻo-tʻo-hai, Kazakh: Köktoğay qalaşığı) is a town of Fuyun County, Altay Prefecture, Xinjiang, China. The Irtysh River flows through Köktokay. It has abundant mineral and touristic resources, including the Koktokay National Geopark (可可托海國家地質公園). As of 2000 it had a population of 6,014.

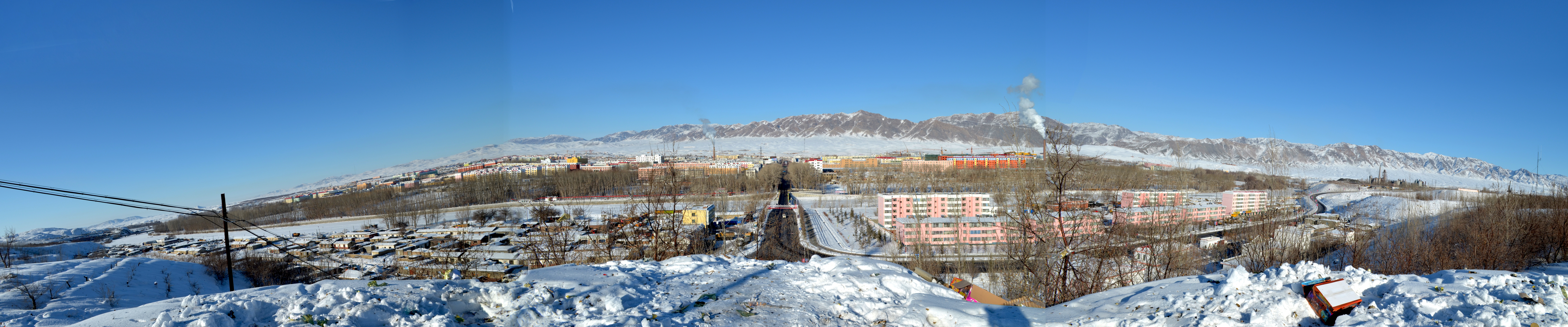
Irtysh River in the town Koktokay — Panorama in the winter time.

== See also ==
- List of township-level divisions of Xinjiang
