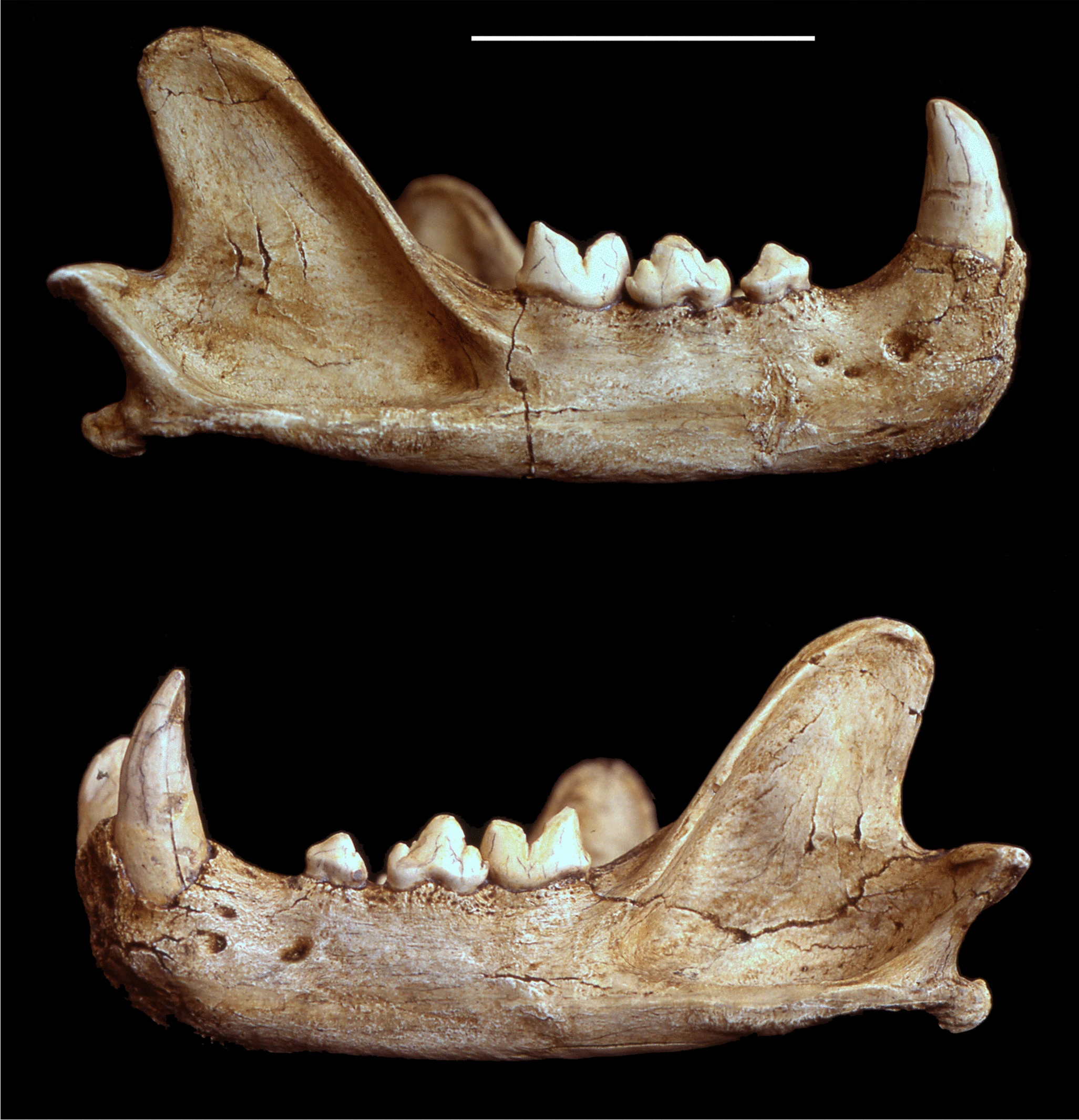
- Cast of the holotype mandible

Scientific classification
- Kingdom: Animalia
- Phylum: Chordata
- Class: Mammalia
- Order: Carnivora
- Family: Felidae
- Genus: Panthera
- Species: P. uncia
- Subspecies: †P. u. pyrenaica

Trinomial name
- †Panthera uncia pyrenaica Hemmer, 2022

Synonyms
- "Panthera pardus tautavelensis" Testu et al., 2010; Panthera pyrenaica (Hemmer, 2022)

= Panthera uncia pyrenaica =

Panthera uncia pyrenaica Temporal range: 0.57–0.53 Ma

Extinct subspecies of felid

Panthera uncia pyrenaica, or Panthera pyrenaica, is an extinct pantherine felid that lived during the Middle Pleistocene in Southern France. The holotype of this taxon has been suggested to be a modern leopard, a modern snow leopard or possibly a separate species within the genus Panthera.

== Taxonomy ==
Initially mentioned as a snow leopard specimen under study by Hemmer (2003), the holotype mandible was interpreted by other paleontologists as a leopard fossil or a similar pantherine (Panthera cf. pardus or Panthera sp.) prior to 2022. It was also given the name Panthera pardus tautavelensis in the Program/Guide book for 16th International Cave Bear and Lion Symposium, but this name was not formally published in a scientific journal, so it is considered a nomen nudum. In 2022, Hemmer examined the cast of the holotype and suggested that it represents a subspecies of the modern snow leopard, so he named the taxon as P. u. pyrenaica and attributed the colloquial names "European snow leopard" and "Arago snow leopard".

However, the 2025 study which described another possible European paleosubspecies (P. u. lusitana) discovered in Portugal, recovered P. u. pyrenaica outside the modern snow leopard as P. pyrenaica due to the lack of similar traits, though it may be a basal related species, and claimed that its primitive traits are likely symplesiomorphic with the modern leopard instead. The same study also assigned an Early Pleistocene specimen from Longdan (Linxia Basin) of China as P. aff. pyrenaica, and the traits observed in both specimens might indicate that this taxon is likely less adapted to the cold environment and hunting caprines on the mountains. In the same year, Prat-Vericat and colleagues proposed that both P. u. pyrenaica and the aforementioined Portuguese taxon indicate either the migration of snow leopards into Europe due to the Mid-Pleistocene Transition (the so-called "0.9 Ma Event"), or the convergent evolution of European leopards to adapt into rocky habitats that caused their resemblance to the modern snow leopard.
