= Qinggil County =

Qinggil County 青河县 (Chinese) چىڭگىل ناھىيىسى (Uyghur) شىڭگىل اۋدانى (Kazakh) Chinggil, Qinghe, Ch'ing-ho
- County
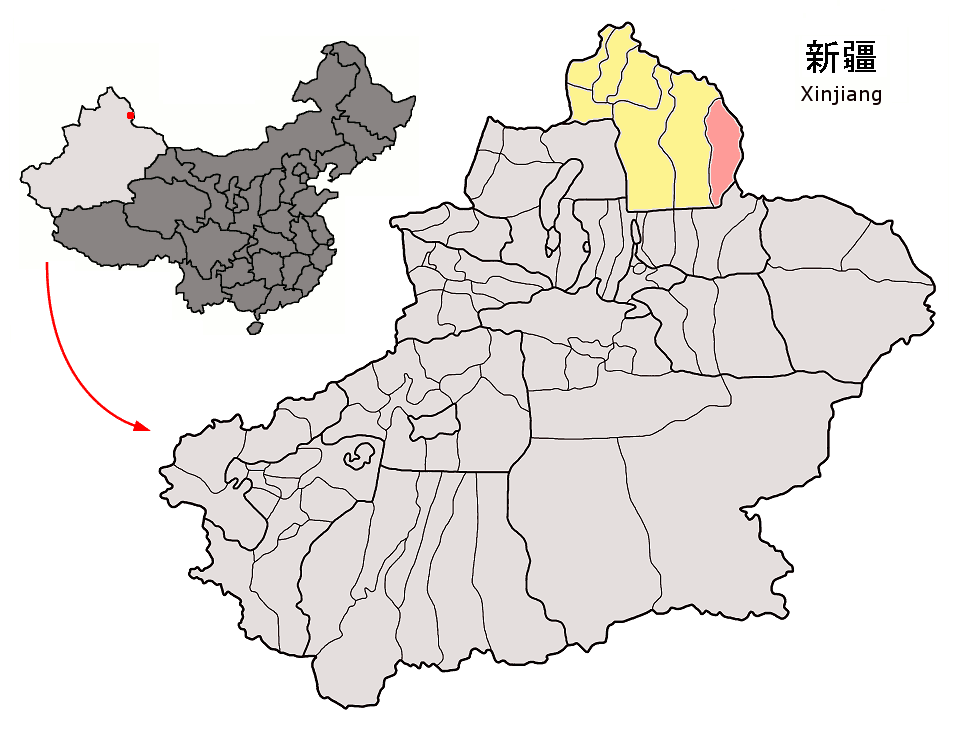
- Location of Qinggil County (pink) in Altay Prefecture (yellow) and Xinjiang

- Location of the county town in Xinjiang Qinggil (Xinjiang) Qinggil (China)
- Coordinates: 46°37′N 90°25′E
- Country: China
- Autonomous region: Xinjiang
- Prefecture: Altay
- County seat: Qinggil
- Township-level divisions: 5 towns 3 townships

Area
  - Total: 15,579.5 km^{2} (6,015.3 sq mi)
- Elevation: 1,220 m (4,000 ft)

Population (2020)
  - Total: 61,680
  - Density: 3.959/km^{2} (10.25/sq mi)

Ethnic groups
  - Major ethnic groups: Kazakh
- Time zone: UTC+8 (China Standard (Note: Locals in Xinjiang frequently observe UTC+6 (Xinjiang Time), 2 hours behind Beijing.))
- Postal code: 836200
- Website: xjqh.gov.cn

Qinggil County

Chinese name
- Simplified Chinese: 青河县
- Traditional Chinese: 青河縣
Transcriptions
Standard Mandarin
- Hanyu Pinyin: Qīnghé Xiàn
- Wade–Giles: Chʻing¹-ho² Hsien⁴

Uyghur name
- Uyghur: چىڭگىل ناھىيىسى
Transcriptions
- Latin Yëziqi: Chinggil nahiyisi
- Yengi Yeziⱪ: Qinggil naⱨiyisi
- SASM/GNC: Qinggil Nahiyisi
- Siril Yëziqi: Чиңгил наһийиси

Kazakh name
- Kazakh: شىڭگىل اۋدانى; Шіңгіл ауданы Şıñgıl audany

Qinggil County (Uyghur), also Chinggil County, Qinghe County, is a county of Altay Prefecture in northeastern Xinjiang, China, bordering Bayan-Ölgii Province and Khovd Province in Mongolia to the east. It has an area of 15,722 km^{2} (6,070 sq mi) with a population of 60,000. Qinghe was the site of a meteorite impact in 1898 and a Mongolian–Chinese border clash in the spring of 1944.

== Name ==
Qinggil County is named for the Qinggil River (青格里河), a tributary of the Ulungur River. 'Qinggil' is from Mongolian and means 'beautiful and crystal clear'.

== History ==
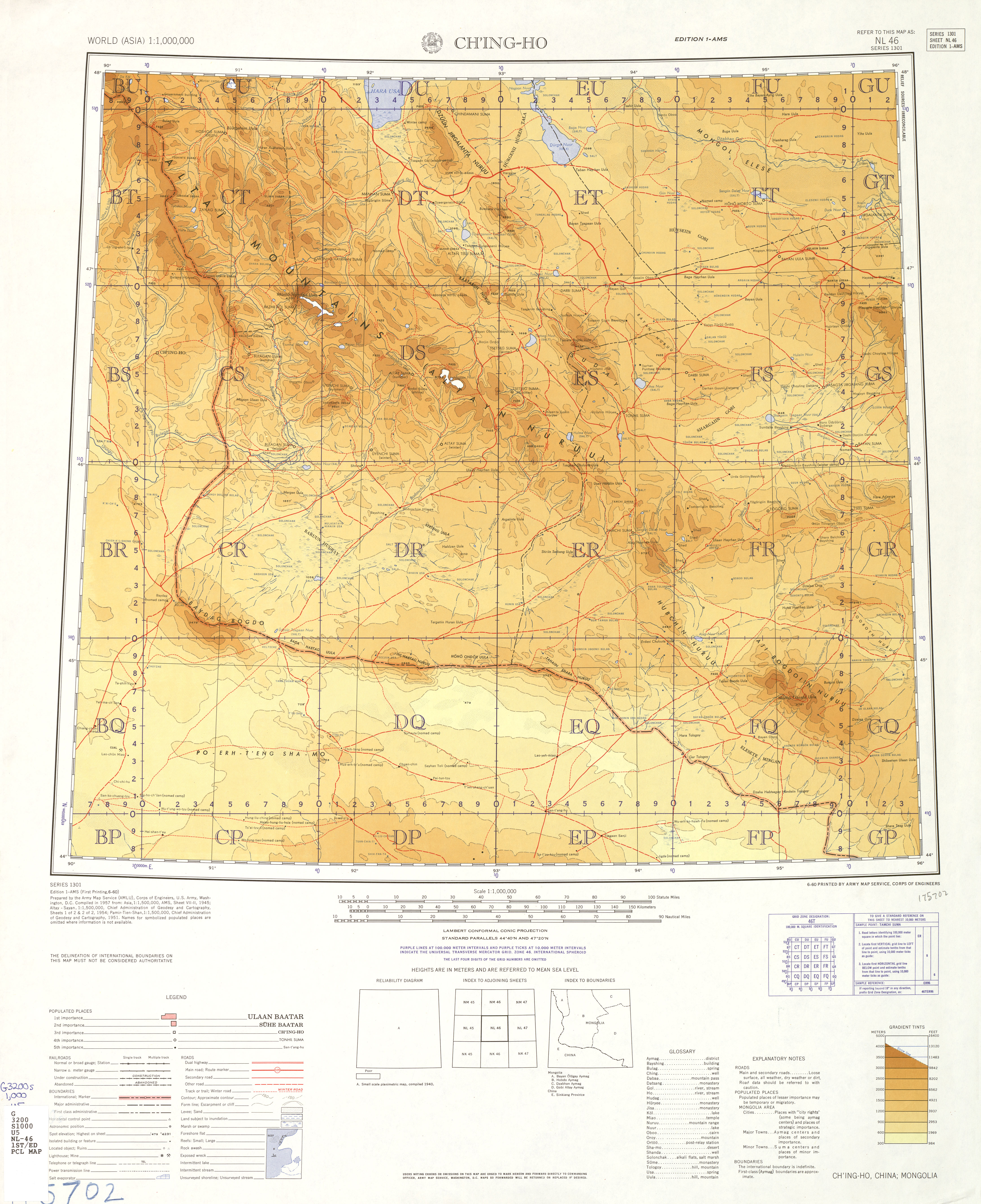
Map of Qinggil (labeled as CH'ING-HO) and surrounding region from the International Map of the World (1957)

In 1941/4, Qinggil County was established.

In 2012, Araltobe Township was made a town.

== Administrative divisions ==
Qinggil County is divided into 5 towns, 3 townships.

Name	Simplified Chinese	Hanyu Pinyin	Uyghur (UEY)	Uyghur Latin (ULY)	Kazakh (Arabic script)	Kazakh (Cyrillic script)	Administrative division code
Towns
Qinggil Town	青河镇	Qīnghé Zhèn	چىڭگىل بازىرى	chinggil baziri	شىڭگىل قالاشىعى	Шіңгіл қалашығы	654325100
Taykeshken Town	塔克什肯镇	Tǎkèshíkěn Zhèn	تاشقىن بازىرى	tashqin baziri	تايكەشكەن قالاشىعى	Тайкешкен қалашығы	654325101
Araltobe Town	阿热勒托别镇	Ārèlètuōbié Zhèn	ئارالتۆپە بازىرى	Araltöpe baziri	ارالتوبە قالاشىعى	Аралтөбе қалашығы	654325102
Aqdala Town	阿格达拉镇	Āgédálā Zhèn	ئاقدالا بازىرى	Aqdala baziri	اقدالا قالاشىعى	Ақдала қалашығы	654325103
Aral Town	阿热勒镇	Ārèlè Zhèn	ئارال بازىرى	Aral baziri	ارال قالاشىعى	Арал қалашығы	654325104
Townships
Sartoqay Township	萨尔托海乡	Sà'ěrtuōhǎi Xiāng	سارتوقاي يېزىسى	sartoqay yëzisi	سارىتوعاي اۋىلى	Сарытоғай ауылы	654325202
Qagan Gol Township	查干郭勒乡	Chágànguōlè Xiāng	چاغانغول يېزىسى	chaghanghol yëzisi	شاعانعول اۋىلى	Шағанғол ауылы	654325203
Agax Obo Township	阿尕什敖包乡	Āgǎshí'áobāo Xiāng	ئاغاش ئوبا يېزىسى	Aghash Oba yëzisi	اعاشوبا اۋىلى	Ағашоба ауылы	654325204

== Climate ==
Climate data for Qinggil, elevation 1,218 m (3,996 ft), (1991–2020 normals, extremes 1991–present)
Month	Jan	Feb	Mar	Apr	May	Jun	Jul	Aug	Sep	Oct	Nov	Dec	Year
Record high °C (°F)	1.4 (34.5)	6.3 (43.3)	19.6 (67.3)	29.5 (85.1)	31.5 (88.7)	35.7 (96.3)	38.4 (101.1)	35.9 (96.6)	32.0 (89.6)	24.4 (75.9)	16.2 (61.2)	4.0 (39.2)	38.4 (101.1)
Mean daily maximum °C (°F)	−12.5 (9.5)	−7.1 (19.2)	2.2 (36.0)	13.6 (56.5)	20.1 (68.2)	25.5 (77.9)	27.3 (81.1)	26.0 (78.8)	20.1 (68.2)	11.4 (52.5)	−0.8 (30.6)	−10.4 (13.3)	9.6 (49.3)
Daily mean °C (°F)	−21.4 (−6.5)	−16.3 (2.7)	−5.5 (22.1)	6.6 (43.9)	13.0 (55.4)	18.5 (65.3)	20.2 (68.4)	18.2 (64.8)	11.7 (53.1)	3.4 (38.1)	−8.5 (16.7)	−18.4 (−1.1)	1.8 (35.2)
Mean daily minimum °C (°F)	−27.4 (−17.3)	−23.3 (−9.9)	−12.2 (10.0)	0.1 (32.2)	5.7 (42.3)	11.0 (51.8)	12.9 (55.2)	10.5 (50.9)	4.3 (39.7)	−2.9 (26.8)	−13.8 (7.2)	−23.9 (−11.0)	−4.9 (23.2)
Record low °C (°F)	−45.0 (−49.0)	−38.4 (−37.1)	−38.6 (−37.5)	−24.6 (−12.3)	−5.4 (22.3)	0.7 (33.3)	5.0 (41.0)	−1.5 (29.3)	−7.7 (18.1)	−21.5 (−6.7)	−36.5 (−33.7)	−42.1 (−43.8)	−45.0 (−49.0)
Average precipitation mm (inches)	10.3 (0.41)	7.1 (0.28)	9.0 (0.35)	13.1 (0.52)	15.4 (0.61)	26.6 (1.05)	29.2 (1.15)	20.1 (0.79)	13.7 (0.54)	13.3 (0.52)	22.8 (0.90)	13.7 (0.54)	194.3 (7.66)
Average precipitation days (≥ 0.1 mm)	5.7	4.6	4.2	4.9	6.3	6.9	7.7	6.4	5.3	5.4	7.2	6.9	71.5
Average snowy days	7.3	6.7	5.8	3.0	0.7	0	0	0	0.4	3.3	8.6	8.8	44.6
Average relative humidity (%)	74	73	65	49	44	47	51	50	50	59	72	75	59
Mean monthly sunshine hours	182.5	205.7	266.1	280.0	316.7	317.9	316.5	304.2	275.7	233.3	173.4	157.1	3,029.1
Percentage possible sunshine	65	69	71	68	68	67	67	71	75	71	63	59	68
Source: China Meteorological Administrationall-time August high

== Economy ==
Qinggil County has forests as well as coal and mica. Industries include mining, livestock product processing, wool-spinning, leather-making and others. Animal husbandry is common.

== Demographics ==
Historical population
Year	Pop.	±% p.a.
2000	53,843	—
2010	58,858	+0.89%

As of 2019, 76.47% of the residents of the county were Kazakh, 18.27% were Han Chinese, and 5.26% were from other ethnic groups.

As of 2015, 50,091 of the 65,290 residents of the county were Kazakh, 11,892 were Han Chinese and 3,307 were from other ethnic groups.

As of 1997, 75.2% of the population of Qinggil County was Kazakh.

The proportion of nationalities in Qinggil County, 2018
Nationality	Percentage
Kazakhs	76.8%
Han People	18.1%
Hui People	2.1%
Mongols	1.4%
Uyghurs	0.9%
Others	0.7%
Source of the population statistics :

== Wildlife ==
The Sino-Mongolian beaver, Castor fiber birulai, is found only in the basin of the Ulungur River. The population is considered endangered. The Bulgan Beaver Nature Reserve (Chinese: 布尔根河河狸自然保护区; 46°12′00″N 90°45′00″E) has been established on the Bulgan River (a tributary of the Ulungur River) in Qinggil (Qinghe) County in 1980 to protect the creatures.

== See also ==
- 45×90 points#45°N, 90°E
- qingheiite, a mineral named for Qinggil County
