= Fuyun County =

Fuyun County: 富蕴县 (Chinese); كۆكتوقاي ناھىيىسى (Uyghur); كوكتوعاي اۋدانى (Kazakh); Koktokay County
- County
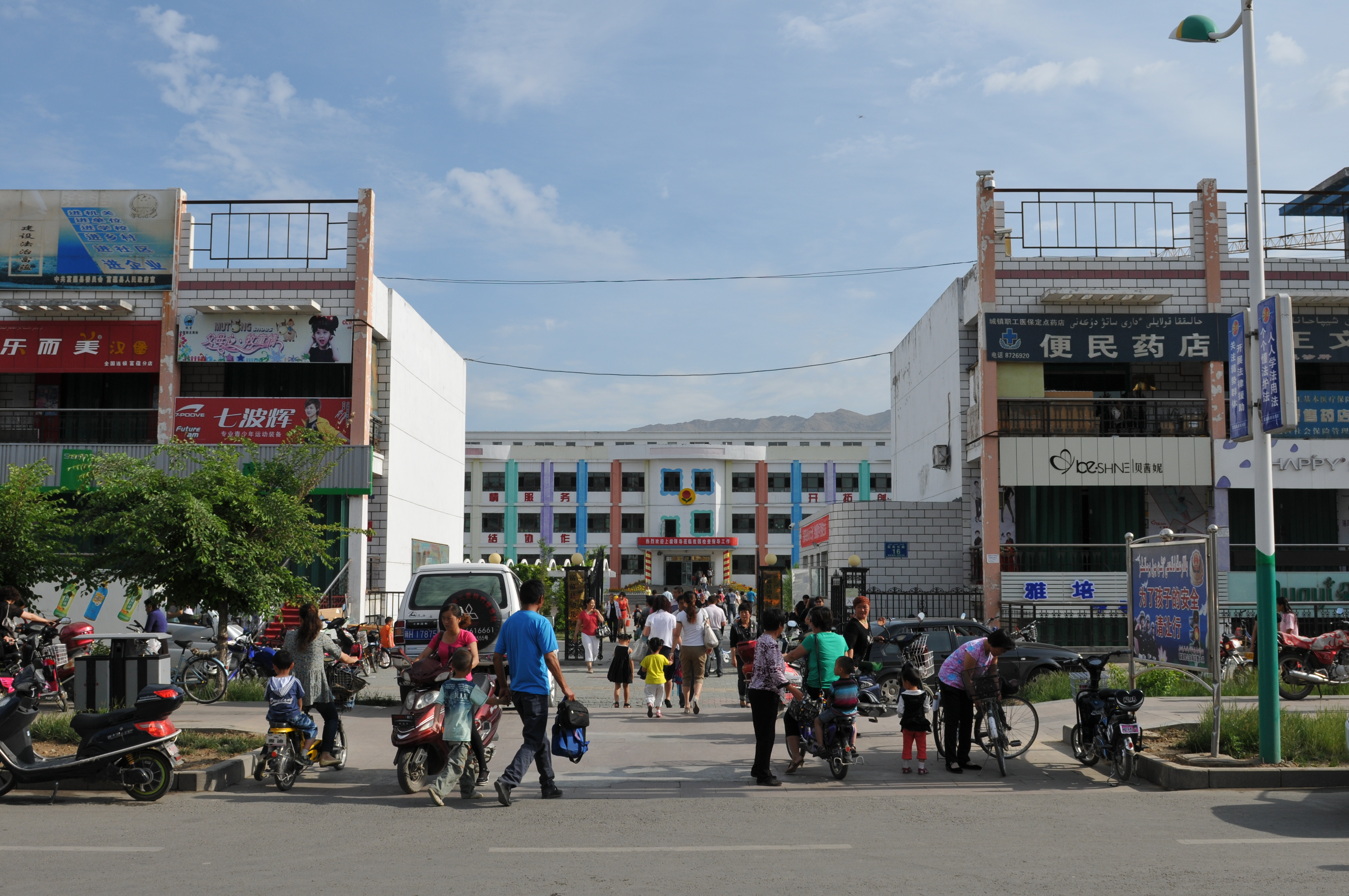
- Fuyun County in 2011

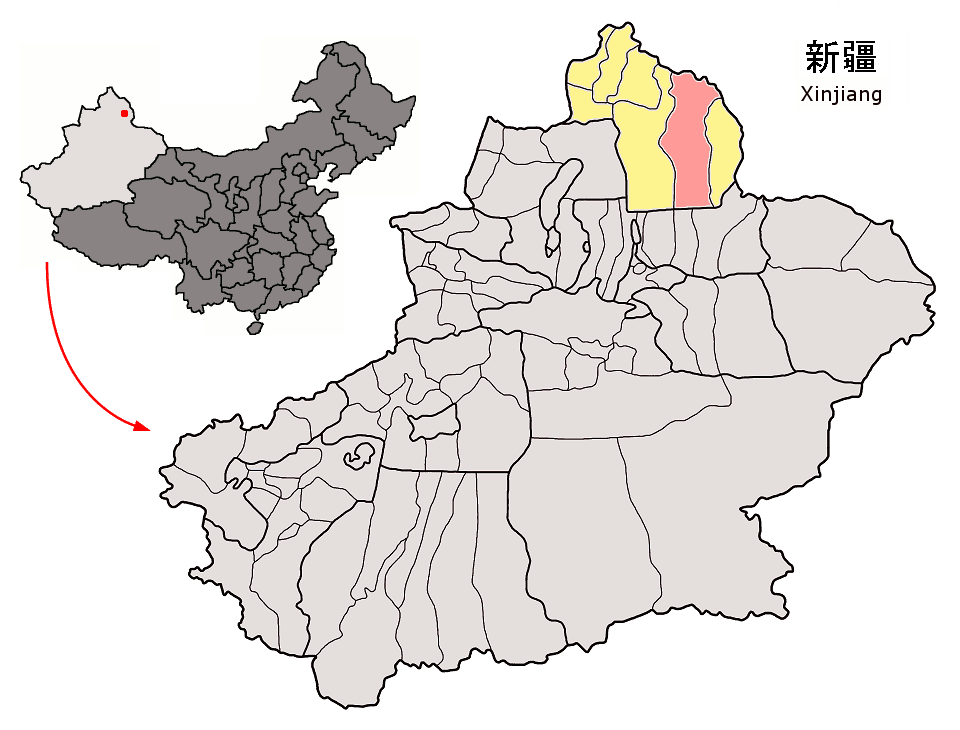
- Location of Fuyun County (red) in Altay Prefecture (yellow) and Xinjiang

- Location of the county seat in Xinjiang Fuyun (Xinjiang) Fuyun (China)
- Coordinates: 47°13′N 89°39′E
- Country: China
- Autonomous region: Xinjiang
- Prefecture: Altay
- Township-level divisions: 3 towns 6 townships 3 ethnic townships
- County seat: Ku Ertix

Area
  - Total: 32,237 km^{2} (12,447 sq mi)

Dimensions
  - Length: 413 km (257 mi)
  - Width: 180 km (110 mi)
- Highest elevation: 3,863 m (12,674 ft)
- Lowest elevation: 430 m (1,410 ft)

Population (2020)
  - Total: 99,748
  - Density: 3.0942/km^{2} (8.0140/sq mi)

Demographics
  - Major ethnic groups: 74% Kazakhs; 20.9% Han Chinese
- Time zone: UTC+8 (China Standard (Note: Locals in Xinjiang frequently observe UTC+6 (Xinjiang Time), 2 hours behind Beijing.))
- Postal code: 836100
- Website: www.xjfy.gov.cn

Fuyun County

Chinese name
- Simplified Chinese: 富蕴县
- Traditional Chinese: 富蘊縣
Transcriptions
Standard Mandarin
- Hanyu Pinyin: Fùyùn Xiàn

Alternative Chinese name
- Simplified Chinese: 可可托海县
- Traditional Chinese: 可可託海縣
Transcriptions
Standard Mandarin
- Hanyu Pinyin: Kěkětuōhǎi Xiàn

Mongolian name
- Mongolian Cyrillic: Хөхтохой шянь
- Mongolian script: ᠬᠥᠬᠡᠲᠣᠬᠣᠢ ᠰᠢᠶᠠᠨ
Transcriptions
- SASM/GNC: xöxetoꭓoi siyan

Uyghur name
- Uyghur: كۆكتوقاي ناھىيىسى
Transcriptions
- Latin Yëziqi: Köktoqay Nahiyisi
- Yengi Yeziⱪ: Kɵktoⱪay Naⱨiyisi
- SASM/GNC: Köktokay Nahiyisi
- Siril Yëziqi: Көктоқай Наһийиси

Kazakh name
- Kazakh: كوكتوعاي اۋدانى; Көктоғай ауданы Köktoğai audany

Fuyun County (Chinese: 富蕴县), also known as Koktokay County (Uyghur: كۆكتوقاي ناھىيىسى; Kazakh: كوكتوعاي اۋدانى), is a county of Altay Prefecture, in the Xinjiang Uyghur Autonomous Region of China. It has an area of 32,237 km^{2} with a population of 80,000. The seat of Fuyun County is in Ku Ertix Town. The Koktokay National Geopark is in Koktokay Town. The postal code of Fuyun County is 836100. The county is served by Fuyun Keketuohai Airport.

== Administrative divisions ==
Fuyun County is divided into 5 towns and 5 townships.

Name	Simplified Chinese	Hanyu Pinyin	Uyghur (UEY)	Uyghur Latin (ULY)	Kazakh (Arabic script)	Kazakh (Cyrillic script)	Administrative division code
Towns
Ku Ertix Town (Ku'ertix)	库额尔齐斯镇	Kù'é'ěrqísī Zhèn	قۇئېرتىش بازىرى	qu'ërtish baziri	قۋەرتىس قالاشىعى	Қуертіс қалашығы	654322100
Koktokay Town	可可托海镇	Kěkětuōhǎi Zhèn	كۆكتوقاي ناھىيىسى	köktoqay baziri	كوكتوعاي قالاشىعى	Көктоғай қалашығы	654322101
Shakurti Town	恰库尔图镇	Qiàkù'ěrtú Zhèn	چاكۇرتى بازىرى	chaqurti baziri	شاكۇرتى قالاشىعى	Шакүрті қалашығы	654322102
Karatüngke Town	喀拉通克镇	Kālātōngkè Zhèn	قارا تۇڭكې بازىرى	qara tungkë baziri	قارا توڭكە قالاشىعى	Қара Төңке қалашығы	654322103
Dure Town	杜热镇	Dùrè Zhèn	دۈرە بازىرى	düre baziri	دۇرە قالاشىعى	Дүре қалашығы	654322104
Townships
Turgun Township	吐尔洪乡	Tǔ'ěrhóng Xiāng	تۇرغۇن يېزىسى	turghun yëzisi	تۇرعىن اۋىلى	Тұрғын ауылы	654322200
Kürti Township	库尔特乡	Kù'ěrtè Xiāng	كۈرتى يېزىسى	kürti yëzisi	كۇرتى اۋىلى	Күрті ауылы	654322202
Kizilshilik Township	克孜勒希力克乡	Kèzīlèxīlìkè Xiāng	قىزىل شىلىك يېزىسى	qizil shilik yëzisi	قىزىل شىلىك اۋىلى	Қызыл шілік ауылы	654322203
Temeki Township	铁买克乡	Tiěmǎikè Xiāng	تاماكا يېزىسى	tamaka yëzisi	تەمەكى اۋىلى	Темекi ауылы	654322204
Karabulgin Township	喀拉布勒根乡	Kālābùlègēn Xiāng	قارابۇلغۇن يېزىسى	qarabulghun yëzisi	قارابۇلعىن اۋىلى	Қарабұлғын ауылы	654322205

== Demographics ==
The proportion of nationalities in Shanshan (Pichan) County
Nationality	Percentage
Kazakhs	74.0%
Han	20.9%
Hui	2.1%
Uyghurs	1.9%
Mongols	0.3%
Others	0.8%
Source of the population statistics :

== Climate ==
Climate data for Fuyun County, elevation 860 m (2,820 ft), (1991–2020 normals, extremes 1960–present)
Month	Jan	Feb	Mar	Apr	May	Jun	Jul	Aug	Sep	Oct	Nov	Dec	Year
Record high °C (°F)	5.1 (41.2)	7.7 (45.9)	24.5 (76.1)	31.0 (87.8)	34.7 (94.5)	39.2 (102.6)	42.2 (108.0)	38.7 (101.7)	35.2 (95.4)	28.4 (83.1)	18.2 (64.8)	10.0 (50.0)	42.2 (108.0)
Mean daily maximum °C (°F)	−11.0 (12.2)	−6.2 (20.8)	3.2 (37.8)	15.9 (60.6)	22.6 (72.7)	28.5 (83.3)	30.3 (86.5)	28.8 (83.8)	22.4 (72.3)	13.4 (56.1)	1.4 (34.5)	−8.5 (16.7)	11.7 (53.1)
Daily mean °C (°F)	−18.9 (−2.0)	−14.6 (5.7)	−4.0 (24.8)	8.8 (47.8)	15.4 (59.7)	21.3 (70.3)	23.2 (73.8)	21.1 (70.0)	14.6 (58.3)	6.1 (43.0)	−5.3 (22.5)	−15.5 (4.1)	4.4 (39.8)
Mean daily minimum °C (°F)	−24.1 (−11.4)	−20.7 (−5.3)	−9.9 (14.2)	2.5 (36.5)	8.2 (46.8)	14.0 (57.2)	16.3 (61.3)	14.0 (57.2)	7.7 (45.9)	0.4 (32.7)	−10.0 (14.0)	−20.4 (−4.7)	−1.8 (28.7)
Record low °C (°F)	−51.5 (−60.7)	−52.3 (−62.1)	−40.7 (−41.3)	−17.7 (0.1)	−5.9 (21.4)	−0.3 (31.5)	4.7 (40.5)	0.6 (33.1)	−6.0 (21.2)	−19.3 (−2.7)	−41.8 (−43.2)	−47.5 (−53.5)	−52.3 (−62.1)
Average precipitation mm (inches)	14.1 (0.56)	10.1 (0.40)	11.0 (0.43)	13.5 (0.53)	17.0 (0.67)	23.7 (0.93)	31.1 (1.22)	20.5 (0.81)	15.0 (0.59)	17.4 (0.69)	26.8 (1.06)	18.2 (0.72)	218.4 (8.61)
Average precipitation days (≥ 0.1 mm)	7.3	6.6	6.0	5.7	6.9	6.7	7.5	6.4	5.4	6.2	8.7	8.5	81.9
Average snowy days	8.2	8.4	7.5	2.2	0.4	0	0	0	0.2	2.6	9.2	10.3	49
Average relative humidity (%)	75	74	69	49	42	42	45	45	47	57	72	76	58
Mean monthly sunshine hours	165.3	185.8	238.3	261.6	309.6	313.8	314.7	300.1	261.6	213.1	149.7	137.3	2,850.9
Percentage possible sunshine	59	63	64	63	66	66	67	70	71	65	54	52	63
Source: China Meteorological AdministrationJan record low (at Koktokay)

== See also ==
- Ospan Batyr
