= Altay Prefecture =

Prefecture of Xinjiang, China

Altay Prefecture: 阿勒泰地区 (Chinese); ئالتاي ۋىلايىتى (Uyghur); التاي ايماعى (Kazakh)
- Prefecture
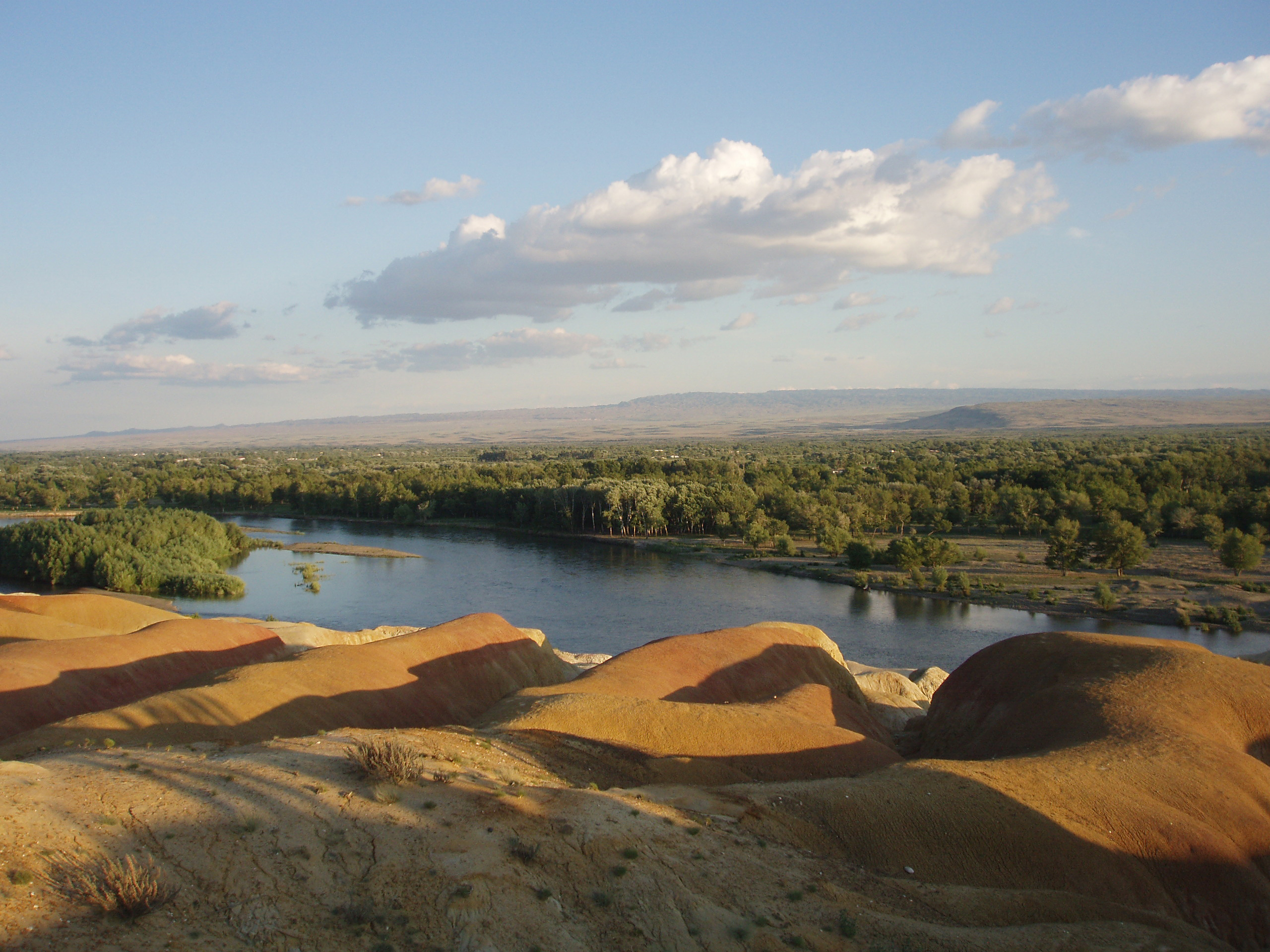
- The Black Irtysh river in Burqin County

- Altay Prefecture (red) in Ili Kazakh Autonomous Prefecture (light red) and Xinjiang (orange)
- Coordinates (Altay City): 47.83°N 88.13°E
- Country: People's Republic of China
- Province: Xinjiang
- Sub-provincial: Ili Prefecture
- Seat: Altay City

Area
  - Prefecture: 117,710 km^{2} (45,450 sq mi)
  - Metro: 10,826 km^{2} (4,180 sq mi)

Population (2020 census)
  - Prefecture: 648,173
  - Density: 5.5065/km^{2} (14.262/sq mi)
  - Metro: 221,454
  - Metro density: 20.456/km^{2} (52.980/sq mi)

GDP
  - Prefecture: CN¥ 33.9 billion US$ 4.9 billion
  - Per capita: CN¥ 51,524; US$ 7,469
- Time zone: UTC+8 (China Standard)
- ISO 3166 code: CN-XJ-43
- Website: www.xjalt.gov.cn

Altay Prefecture

Chinese name
- Simplified Chinese: 阿勒泰地区
- Traditional Chinese: 阿勒泰地區
Transcriptions
Standard Mandarin
- Hanyu Pinyin: Ālètài Dìqū
- Wade–Giles: A^{1}-lê^{4}-tʻai^{4} Ti^{4}-chʻü^{1}
other Mandarin
- Xiao'erjing: اَلَ‌تَیْ دِکِیُوِ

Uyghur name
- Uyghur: ئالتاي ۋىلايىتى
Transcriptions
- Latin Yëziqi: Altay wilayiti
- Yengi Yeziⱪ: Altay wilayiti
- SASM/GNC: Altay wilayiti
- Siril Yëziqi: Алтай вилайити

Kazakh name
- Kazakh: التاي ايماعى; Алтай аймағы Altaı aımaǵy

Altay Prefecture (Note: Chinese: 阿勒泰地区; pinyin: Ālètài Dìqū; Uyghur: ئالتاي ۋىلايىتى, romanized: Altay wilayiti; Kazakh: التاي ايماعى, romanized: Altaı aımaǵy) is a prefecture in northern Xinjiang, China. It has an area of 118,015 km^{2} (45,566 sq mi) and a population of 561,667 (2000). It is a part of the Ili Kazakh Autonomous Prefecture. As of the 2000 census, Altay was the only major subdivision of Ili Kazakh Autonomous Prefecture with an ethnic Kazakh majority (about 51%). In 2007, it had a GDP of RMB 9.9 billion with a 12% growth rate. It also shares an international border with the neighboring Altai Republic, located within Russia.

Altay is considered the birthplace of skiing, based on 10,000 to 30,000 year old cave paintings depicting skiers.

== Geography ==
Both the Irtysh River and the Ulungur River run through the prefecture. The Kanas Lake and Ulungur Lake reside in the north.

The Altay Prefecture has an average elevation of 1,408 meters; with a minimum elevation of 246 meters and a maximum of 4,178 meters.

== Subdivisions ==
The prefecture is divided into one county-level city and six counties.

#	Name	Hanzi	Hanyu Pinyin	Uyghur (UEY)	Uyghur Latin (ULY)	Kazakh (Arabic script)	Kazakh Latin alphabet	Population (2020 Census)	Area (km^{2})	Density (/km^{2})
1	Altay City	阿勒泰市	Ālètài Shì	ئالتاي شەھىرى	Altay Shehiri	التاي قالاسى	Altaı qalasy	221,454	10,826	20.46
2	Burqin County	布尔津县	Bù'ěrjīn Xiàn	بۇرچىن ناھىيىسى	Burchin Nahiyisi	بۋىرشىن اۋدانى	Býyrshyn aýdany	72,894	10,345	7.05
3	Fuyun County	富蕴县	Fùyùn Xiàn	كوكتوقاي ناھىيىسى	Koktoqay Nahiyisi	كوكتوعاي اۋدانى	Kóktoǵaı aýdany	99,748	32,209	3.10
4	Fuhai County	福海县	Fúhǎi Xiàn	بۇرۇلتوقاي ناھىيىسى	Burultoqay Nahiyisi	بۋرىلتوعاي اۋدانى	Buryltoǵaı aýdany	75,537	33,261	2.27
5	Habahe County	哈巴河县	Hābāhé Xiàn	قابا ناھىيىسى	Qaba Nahiyisi	قابا اۋدانى	Qaba aýdany	82,524	8,181	10.09
6	Qinghe County	青河县	Qīnghé Xiàn	چىڭگىل ناھىيىسى	Chinggil Nahiyisi	شىڭگىل اۋدانى	Shińgil aýdany	61,680	15,743	3.92
7	Jeminay County	吉木乃县	Jímùnǎi Xiàn	جېمىنەي ناھىيىسى	Jëminey Nahiyisi	جەمەنەي اۋدانى	Jemeneı aýdany	34,336	7,146	4.80

== Demographics ==
Ethnic composition in Altay Prefecture
Ethnic groups	Proportion / %
Kazakhs	52.76%
Han	39.85%
Hui	3.82%
Uyghurs	1.42%
Mongols	0.99%
Others	1.16%
Source of the population statistics :

== Administration ==
Secretary of the Party Committee

- Zhang Yan March 2017 –

Administrative Commissioner

1. Mawken Seyitqamzaüli 2003 – 2007
2. Aitzhanuly Sabir (2007-2012)
3. Talgat Usen zh:塔里哈提·吾逊 2012 — 1 April 2017
4. Qadan Käbenuly 1 April 2017 — April 2021
5. Zhenis Khadis 2021 – 2026
6. Aydyn Toleukhanuly
7. Mukhtar Kalimbek May 2026
