= List of administrative divisions of Xinjiang =

Xinjiang Uyghur Autonomous Region
- Autonomous region
- Capital: Ürümqi

Prefecture-level divisions
- Sub-provincial autonomous prefectures: 1
- Prefectural cities: 4
- Prefectures: 5
- Autonomous prefectures: 4

County level divisions
- County cities: 30^{*}
- Counties: 62
- Autonomous counties: 6
- Districts: 13

Township level divisions
- Towns: 308
- Townships: 582
- Ethnic townships: 43
- Subdistricts: 145
- District public offices: 1

Villages level divisions
- Communities: 3,274
- Administrative villages: 8,834
- ^{*} 13 of the 30 County cities are administered by XPCC

Xinjiang, an autonomous region of the People's Republic of China, is made up of the following administrative divisions.

== Administrative divisions ==
These administrative divisions are explained in greater detail at Administrative divisions of the People's Republic of China. The following table lists only the prefecture-level and county-level divisions of Xinjiang.

Prefecture level		County Level							
Prefecture level		English name official	Uyghur Ereb Yëziqi (UEY)	Latin Yéziqi (ULY)	SASM/GNC (broad) official transcription	Chinese	Hanyu Pinyin	Division code	
Ürümqi city ئۈرۈمچى شەھىرى; Ürümchi Shehiri; Ürümqi Xahiri 乌鲁木齐市; Wūlǔmùqí Shì (Capital) (6501 / URC)		Tianshan District	تىيانشان رايونى	Tiyanshan Rayoni	Tiyanxan Rayoni	天山区	Tiānshān Qū	650102	TSL
Ürümqi city ئۈرۈمچى شەھىرى; Ürümchi Shehiri; Ürümqi Xahiri 乌鲁木齐市; Wūlǔmùqí Shì (Capital) (6501 / URC)		Saybag District	سايباغ رايونى	Saybagh Rayoni	Saybag Rayoni	沙依巴克区	Shāyībākè Qū	650103	SAY
Ürümqi city ئۈرۈمچى شەھىرى; Ürümchi Shehiri; Ürümqi Xahiri 乌鲁木齐市; Wūlǔmùqí Shì (Capital) (6501 / URC)		Xinshi District	يېڭىشەھەر رايونى	Yëngisheher Rayoni	Yengixahar Rayoni	新市区	Xīnshì Qū	650104	XSU
Ürümqi city ئۈرۈمچى شەھىرى; Ürümchi Shehiri; Ürümqi Xahiri 乌鲁木齐市; Wūlǔmùqí Shì (Capital) (6501 / URC)		Shuimogou District	بۇلاقتاغ رايونى	Bulaqtagh Rayoni	Bulaktag Rayoni	水磨沟区	Shuǐmògōu Qū	650105	SMG
Ürümqi city ئۈرۈمچى شەھىرى; Ürümchi Shehiri; Ürümqi Xahiri 乌鲁木齐市; Wūlǔmùqí Shì (Capital) (6501 / URC)		Toutunhe District	تۇدۇڭخابا رايونى	Tudungxaba Rayoni	Tudunghaba Rayoni	头屯河区	Tóutúnhé Qū	650106	TTH
Ürümqi city ئۈرۈمچى شەھىرى; Ürümchi Shehiri; Ürümqi Xahiri 乌鲁木齐市; Wūlǔmùqí Shì (Capital) (6501 / URC)		Dabancheng District	داۋانچىڭ رايونى	Dawanching Rayoni	Dawanqing Rayoni	达坂城区	Dábǎnchéng Qū	650107	DBC
Ürümqi city ئۈرۈمچى شەھىرى; Ürümchi Shehiri; Ürümqi Xahiri 乌鲁木齐市; Wūlǔmùqí Shì (Capital) (6501 / URC)		Midong District	میدونگ رايونى	Midong Rayoni	Midong Rayoni	米东区	Mǐdōng Qū	650109	MOQ
Ürümqi city ئۈرۈمچى شەھىرى; Ürümchi Shehiri; Ürümqi Xahiri 乌鲁木齐市; Wūlǔmùqí Shì (Capital) (6501 / URC)		Ürümqi County	ئۈرۈمچى ناھىيىسى	Ürümchi Nahiyisi	Ürümqi Nahiyisi	乌鲁木齐县	Wūlǔmùqí Xiàn	650121	URX
Karamay city قاراماي شەھىرى; Qaramay Shehiri; Karamay Xahiri 克拉玛依市; Kèlāmǎyī Shì (6502 / KAR)		Dushanzi District	مايتاغ رايونى	Maytagh Rayoni	Maytag Rayoni	独山子区	Dúshānzǐ Qū	650202	DSZ
Karamay city قاراماي شەھىرى; Qaramay Shehiri; Karamay Xahiri 克拉玛依市; Kèlāmǎyī Shì (6502 / KAR)		Karamay District	قاراماي رايونى	Qaramay Rayoni	Karamay Rayoni	克拉玛依区	Kèlāmǎyī Qū	650203	KRQ
Karamay city قاراماي شەھىرى; Qaramay Shehiri; Karamay Xahiri 克拉玛依市; Kèlāmǎyī Shì (6502 / KAR)		Baijiantan District	جەرەنبۇلاق رايونى	Jerenbulaq Rayoni	Jaranbulak Rayoni	白碱滩区	Báijiǎntān Qū	650204	BJT
Karamay city قاراماي شەھىرى; Qaramay Shehiri; Karamay Xahiri 克拉玛依市; Kèlāmǎyī Shì (6502 / KAR)		Orku District	ئورقۇ رايونى	Orqu Rayoni	Orku Rayoni	乌尔禾区	Wū'ěrhé Qū	650205	ORK
Turpan city تۇرپان شەھىرى; Turpan Shehiri; Turpan Xahiri 吐鲁番市; Tǔlǔfān Shì (6504 / TRP)		Gaochang District	قاراھوجا رايونى	Qarahoja Rayoni	Karahoja Rayoni	高昌区	Gāochāng Qū	650402	GCX
Turpan city تۇرپان شەھىرى; Turpan Shehiri; Turpan Xahiri 吐鲁番市; Tǔlǔfān Shì (6504 / TRP)		Shanshan County	پىچان ناھىيىسى	Pichan Nahiyisi	Piqan Nahiyisi	鄯善县	Shànshàn Xiàn	650421	SSX
Turpan city تۇرپان شەھىرى; Turpan Shehiri; Turpan Xahiri 吐鲁番市; Tǔlǔfān Shì (6504 / TRP)		Toksun County	توقسۇن ناھىيىسى	Toqsun Nahiyisi	Toksun Nahiyisi	托克逊县	Tuōkèxùn Xiàn	650422	TOK
Hami city قۇمۇل شەھىرى; Qumul Shehiri; Kumul Xahiri 哈密市; Hāmì Shì (6505 / HMI)		Yizhou District	ئىۋىرغول رايونى	Iwirghol Rayoni	Iwirgol Rayoni	伊州区	Yīzhōu Qū	650502	YZI
Hami city قۇمۇل شەھىرى; Qumul Shehiri; Kumul Xahiri 哈密市; Hāmì Shì (6505 / HMI)		Barkol County (Note: Conventional name: Barkol Kazakh Autonomous County; UEY: باركۆل قازاق ئاپتونوم ناھىيىسى; ULY: Barköl Qazaq Aptonom Nahiyisi; SASM/GNC (broad): arkol Kazak Aptonom Nahiyisi; Chinese: 巴里坤哈萨克自治县; pinyin: Bālǐkūn Hāsàkè Zìzhìxiàn)	باركۆل ناھىيىسى	Barköl Nahiyisi	Barkol Nahiyisi	巴里坤县	Bālǐkūn Xiàn	650522	BAR
Hami city قۇمۇل شەھىرى; Qumul Shehiri; Kumul Xahiri 哈密市; Hāmì Shì (6505 / HMI)		Yiwu County	ئارا تۈرۈك ناھىيىسى	Aratürük Nahiyisi	Aratürük Nahiyisi	伊吾县	Yīwú Xiàn	650523	YWX
Changji Prefecture (Note: Conventional name: Changji Hui Autonomous Prefecture; UEY: سانجى خۇيزۇ ئاپتونوم ئوبلاستى; ULY: Sanji Xuyzu Aptonom Oblasti; SASM/GNC (broad): Sanji Huyzu Aptonom Oblasti; Chinese: 昌吉回族自治州; pinyin: Chāngjí Huízú Zìzhìzhōu) سانجى ئوبلاستى; Sanji Oblasti; Sanji Oblasti 昌吉州; Chāngjí Zhōu (6523 / CJZ)		Changji city	سانجى شەھىرى	Sanji Shehiri	Sanji Xahiri	昌吉市	Chāngjí Shì	652301	CJS
Changji Prefecture سانجى ئوبلاستى; Sanji Oblasti; Sanji Oblasti 昌吉州; Chāngjí Zhōu (6523 / CJZ)		Fukang city	فۇكاڭ شەھىرى	Fukang Shehiri	Fukang Xahiri	阜康市	Fùkāng Shì	652302	FKG
Changji Prefecture سانجى ئوبلاستى; Sanji Oblasti; Sanji Oblasti 昌吉州; Chāngjí Zhōu (6523 / CJZ)		Hutubi County	قۇتۇبى ناھىيىسى	Qutubi Nahiyisi	Kutubi Nahiyisi	呼图壁县	Hūtúbì Xiàn	652323	HTB
Changji Prefecture سانجى ئوبلاستى; Sanji Oblasti; Sanji Oblasti 昌吉州; Chāngjí Zhōu (6523 / CJZ)		Manas County	ماناس ناھىيىسى	Manas Nahiyisi	Manas Nahiyisi	玛纳斯县	Mǎnàsī Xiàn	652324	MAS
Changji Prefecture سانجى ئوبلاستى; Sanji Oblasti; Sanji Oblasti 昌吉州; Chāngjí Zhōu (6523 / CJZ)		Qitai County	گۇچۇڭ ناھىيىسى	Guchung Nahiyisi	Guqung Nahiyisi	奇台县	Qítái Xiàn	652325	QTA
Changji Prefecture سانجى ئوبلاستى; Sanji Oblasti; Sanji Oblasti 昌吉州; Chāngjí Zhōu (6523 / CJZ)		Jimsar County	جىمىسار ناھىيىسى	Jimisar Nahiyisi	Jimisar Nahiyisi	吉木萨尔县	Jímùsà'ěr Xiàn	652327	JIM
Changji Prefecture سانجى ئوبلاستى; Sanji Oblasti; Sanji Oblasti 昌吉州; Chāngjí Zhōu (6523 / CJZ)		Mori County (Note: Conventional name: Mori Kazakh Autonomous County; UEY: موري قازاق اۆتونوميالىق اۋدانى; ULY: Mori Qazaq Aptonom Nahiyisi; SASM/GNC (broad): Mori Kazak Aptonom Nahiyisi; Chinese: 木垒哈萨克自治县; pinyin: Mùlěi Hāsàkè Zìzhìxiàn)	مورى ئاپتونوم	Mori Nahiyisi	Mori Nahiyisi	木垒县	Mùlěi Xiàn	652328	MOR
Bortala Prefecture (Note: Conventional name: Bortala Mongol Autonomous Prefecture; UEY: بۆرتالا موڭغۇل ئاپتونوم ئوبلاستى; ULY: Börtala Mongghul Aptonom Oblasti; SASM/GNC (broad): Bortala Monggul Aptonom Oblasti; Chinese: 博尔塔拉蒙古自治州; pinyin: Bó'ěrtǎlā Měnggǔ Zìzhìzhōu) بۆرتالا ئوبلاستى; Börtala Oblasti; Bortala Oblasti 博尔塔拉州; Bó'ěrtǎlā Zhōu (6527 / BOR)		Bole city	بۆرتالا شەھىرى	Börtala Shehiri	Bortala Xahiri	博乐市	Bólè Shì	652701	BLE
Bortala Prefecture بۆرتالا ئوبلاستى; Börtala Oblasti; Bortala Oblasti 博尔塔拉州; Bó'ěrtǎlā Zhōu (6527 / BOR)		Alashankou city	ﺋﺎﻻﺗﺎﯞ ئېغىزى شەھرى	Alatawëghizi Shehiri	Alatawegizi Xahiri	阿拉山口市	Ālāshānkǒu Shì	652702	ALA
Bortala Prefecture بۆرتالا ئوبلاستى; Börtala Oblasti; Bortala Oblasti 博尔塔拉州; Bó'ěrtǎlā Zhōu (6527 / BOR)		Jinghe County	جىڭ ناھىيىسى	Jing Nahiyisi	Jing Nahiyisi	精河县	Jīnghé Xiàn	652722	JGH
Bortala Prefecture بۆرتالا ئوبلاستى; Börtala Oblasti; Bortala Oblasti 博尔塔拉州; Bó'ěrtǎlā Zhōu (6527 / BOR)		Wenquan County	ئارىشاڭ ناھىيىسى	Arishang Nahiyisi	Arixang Nahiyisi	温泉县	Wēnquán Xiàn	652723	WNQ
Bayingolin Prefecture (Note: Conventional name: Bayingolin Mongol Autonomous Prefecture; UEY: بايىنغولىن موڭغۇل ئاپتونوم ئوبلاستى; ULY: Bayingholin Mongghul Aptonom Oblasti; SASM/GNC (broad): Bayingolin Monggul Aptonom Oblasti; Chinese: 巴音郭楞蒙古自治州; pinyin: Bāyīnguōlèng Měnggǔ Zìzhìzhōu) بايىنغولىن ئوبلاستى; Bayingholin Oblasti; Bayingolin Oblasti 巴音郭楞州; Bāyīnguōlèng Zhōu (6528 / BAG)		Korla city	كورلا شەھىرى	Korla Shehiri	Korla Xahiri	库尔勒市	Kù'ěrlè Shì	652801	KOR
Bayingolin Prefecture بايىنغولىن ئوبلاستى; Bayingholin Oblasti; Bayingolin Oblasti 巴音郭楞州; Bāyīnguōlèng Zhōu (6528 / BAG)		Luntai County	بۈگۈر ناھىيىسى	Bügür Nahiyisi	Bügür Nahiyisi	轮台县	Lúntái Xiàn	652822	LTX
Bayingolin Prefecture بايىنغولىن ئوبلاستى; Bayingholin Oblasti; Bayingolin Oblasti 巴音郭楞州; Bāyīnguōlèng Zhōu (6528 / BAG)		Yuli County	لوپنۇر ناھىيىسى	Lopnur Nahiyisi	Lopnur Nahiyisi	尉犁县	Yùlí Xiàn (Note: not Wèilí)	652823	YLI
Bayingolin Prefecture بايىنغولىن ئوبلاستى; Bayingholin Oblasti; Bayingolin Oblasti 巴音郭楞州; Bāyīnguōlèng Zhōu (6528 / BAG)		Ruoqiang County	چاقىلىق ناھىيىسى	Chaqiliq Nahiyisi	Qakilik Nahiyisi	若羌县	Ruòqiāng Xiàn	652824	RQG
Bayingolin Prefecture بايىنغولىن ئوبلاستى; Bayingholin Oblasti; Bayingolin Oblasti 巴音郭楞州; Bāyīnguōlèng Zhōu (6528 / BAG)		Qiemo County	چەرچەن ناھىيىسى	Cherchen Nahiyisi	Qarqan Nahiyisi	且末县	Qiěmò Xiàn	652825	QMO
Bayingolin Prefecture بايىنغولىن ئوبلاستى; Bayingholin Oblasti; Bayingolin Oblasti 巴音郭楞州; Bāyīnguōlèng Zhōu (6528 / BAG)		Yanqi County (Note: Conventional name: Yanqi Hui Autonomous County; UEY: يەنجى خۇيزۇ ئاپتونوم ناھىيىسى; ULY: Yenji Xuyzu Aptonom Nahiyisi; SASM/GNC (broad): Yanji Huyzu Aptonom Nahiyisi; Chinese: 焉耆回族自治县; pinyin: Yānqí Huízú Zìzhìxiàn)	يەنجى ناھىيىسى	Yenji Nahiyisi	Yanji Nahiyisi	焉耆县	Yānqí Xiàn	652826	YQI
Bayingolin Prefecture بايىنغولىن ئوبلاستى; Bayingholin Oblasti; Bayingolin Oblasti 巴音郭楞州; Bāyīnguōlèng Zhōu (6528 / BAG)		Hejing County	خېجىڭ ناھىيىسى	Xëjing Nahiyisi	Hejing Nahiyisi	和静县	Héjìng Xiàn	652827	HJG
Bayingolin Prefecture بايىنغولىن ئوبلاستى; Bayingholin Oblasti; Bayingolin Oblasti 巴音郭楞州; Bāyīnguōlèng Zhōu (6528 / BAG)		Hoxud County	خوشۇت ناھىيىسى	Xoshut Nahiyisi	Hoxut Nahiyisi	和硕县	Héshuò Xiàn	652828	HOX
Bayingolin Prefecture بايىنغولىن ئوبلاستى; Bayingholin Oblasti; Bayingolin Oblasti 巴音郭楞州; Bāyīnguōlèng Zhōu (6528 / BAG)		Bohu County	باغراش ناھىيىسى	Baghrash Nahiyisi	Bagrax Nahiyisi	博湖县	Bóhú Xiàn	652829	BHU
Aksu Prefecture ئاقسۇ ۋىلايىتى; Aqsu Wilayiti; Aksu Vilayiti 阿克苏地区; Ākèsū Dìqū (6529 / AKD)		Aksu city	ئاقسۇ شەھىرى	Aqsu Shehiri	Aksu Xahiri	阿克苏市	Ākèsū Shì	652901	AKS
Aksu Prefecture ئاقسۇ ۋىلايىتى; Aqsu Wilayiti; Aksu Vilayiti 阿克苏地区; Ākèsū Dìqū (6529 / AKD)		Kuqa city	كۇچار شەھىرى	Kuchar Shehiri	Kuqar Xahiri	库车市	Kùchē shì	652902	
Aksu Prefecture ئاقسۇ ۋىلايىتى; Aqsu Wilayiti; Aksu Vilayiti 阿克苏地区; Ākèsū Dìqū (6529 / AKD)		Wensu County	ئونسۇ ناھىيىسى	Onsu Nahiyisi	Onsu Nahiyisi	温宿县	Wēnsù Xiàn	652922	WSU
Aksu Prefecture ئاقسۇ ۋىلايىتى; Aqsu Wilayiti; Aksu Vilayiti 阿克苏地区; Ākèsū Dìqū (6529 / AKD)		Xayar County	شايار ناھىيىسى	Shayar Nahiyisi	Xayar Nahiyisi	沙雅县	Shāyǎ Xiàn	652924	XYR
Aksu Prefecture ئاقسۇ ۋىلايىتى; Aqsu Wilayiti; Aksu Vilayiti 阿克苏地区; Ākèsū Dìqū (6529 / AKD)		Xinhe County	توقسۇ ناھىيىسى	Toqsu Nahiyisi	Toksu Nahiyisi	新和县	Xīnhé Xiàn	652925	XHT
Aksu Prefecture ئاقسۇ ۋىلايىتى; Aqsu Wilayiti; Aksu Vilayiti 阿克苏地区; Ākèsū Dìqū (6529 / AKD)		Baicheng County	باي ناھىيىس	Bay Nahiyisi	Bay Nahiyisi	拜城县	Bàichéng Xiàn	652926	BCG
Aksu Prefecture ئاقسۇ ۋىلايىتى; Aqsu Wilayiti; Aksu Vilayiti 阿克苏地区; Ākèsū Dìqū (6529 / AKD)		Wushi County	ئۇچتۇرپان ناھىيىسى	Uchturpan Nahiyisi	Uqturpan Nahiyisi	乌什县	Wūshí Xiàn	652927	WSH
Aksu Prefecture ئاقسۇ ۋىلايىتى; Aqsu Wilayiti; Aksu Vilayiti 阿克苏地区; Ākèsū Dìqū (6529 / AKD)		Awat County	ئاۋات ناھىيىسى	Awat Nahiyisi	Awat Nahiyisi	阿瓦提县	Āwǎtí Xiàn	652928	AWA
Aksu Prefecture ئاقسۇ ۋىلايىتى; Aqsu Wilayiti; Aksu Vilayiti 阿克苏地区; Ākèsū Dìqū (6529 / AKD)		Kalpin County	كەلپىن ناھىيىسى	Kelpin Nahiyisi	Kalpin Nahiyisi	柯坪县	Kēpíng Xiàn	652929	KAL
Kizilsu Prefecture (Note: Conventional name: Kizilsu Kyrgyz Autonomous Prefecture; UEY: قىزىلسۇ قىرغىز ئاپتونوم ئوبلاستى; ULY: Qizilsu Qirghiz Aptonom Oblasti; SASM/GNC (broad): Kizilsu Kirgiz Aptonom Oblasti; Chinese: 克孜勒苏柯尔克孜自治州; pinyin: Kèzīlèsū Kē'ěrkèzī Zìzhìzhōu) قىزىلسۇ ئوبلاستى; Qizilsu Oblasti; Kizilsu Oblasti 克孜勒苏州; Kèzīlèsū Zhōu (6530 / KIZ)		Artux city	ئاتۇش شەھىرى	Atush Shehiri	Atux Xahiri	阿图什市	Ātúshí Shì	653001	ART
Kizilsu Prefecture قىزىلسۇ ئوبلاستى; Qizilsu Oblasti; Kizilsu Oblasti 克孜勒苏州; Kèzīlèsū Zhōu (6530 / KIZ)		Akto County	ئاقتو ناھىيىسى	Aqto Nahiyisi	Akto Nahiyisi	阿克陶县	Ākètáo Xiàn	653022	AKT
Kizilsu Prefecture قىزىلسۇ ئوبلاستى; Qizilsu Oblasti; Kizilsu Oblasti 克孜勒苏州; Kèzīlèsū Zhōu (6530 / KIZ)		Akqi County	ئاقچى ناھىيىسى	Aqchi Nahiyisi	Akqi Nahiyisi	阿合奇县	Āhéqí Xiàn	653023	AKQ
Kizilsu Prefecture قىزىلسۇ ئوبلاستى; Qizilsu Oblasti; Kizilsu Oblasti 克孜勒苏州; Kèzīlèsū Zhōu (6530 / KIZ)		Wuqia County	ئۇلۇغچات ناھىيىسى	Ulughchat Nahiyisi	Uluqqat Nahiyisi	乌恰县	Wūqià Xiàn	653024	WQA
Kashi Prefecture قەشقەر ۋىلايىتى; Qeshqer Wilayiti; Kaxkar Vilayiti 喀什地区; Kāshí Dìqū (6531 / KSI)		Kashi city	قەشقەر شەھىرى	Qeshqer Shehiri	Kaxkar Xahiri	喀什市	Kāshí Shì	653101	KHG
Kashi Prefecture قەشقەر ۋىلايىتى; Qeshqer Wilayiti; Kaxkar Vilayiti 喀什地区; Kāshí Dìqū (6531 / KSI)		Shufu County	قەشقەر كونا شەھەر ناھىيىسى	Qeshqer Konasheher Nahiyisi	Kaxkar Konaxahar Nahiyisi	疏附县	Shūfù Xiàn	653121	SFU
Kashi Prefecture قەشقەر ۋىلايىتى; Qeshqer Wilayiti; Kaxkar Vilayiti 喀什地区; Kāshí Dìqū (6531 / KSI)		Shule County	قەشقەر يېڭىشەھەر ناھىيىسى	Qeshqer Yéngisheher Nahiyisi	Kaxkar Yengixahar Nahiyisi	疏勒县	Shūlè Xiàn	653122	SHL
Kashi Prefecture قەشقەر ۋىلايىتى; Qeshqer Wilayiti; Kaxkar Vilayiti 喀什地区; Kāshí Dìqū (6531 / KSI)		Yengisar County	يېڭىسار ناھىيىسى	Yëngisar Nahiyisi	Yengisar Nahiyisi	英吉沙县	Yīngjíshā Xiàn	653123	YEN
Kashi Prefecture قەشقەر ۋىلايىتى; Qeshqer Wilayiti; Kaxkar Vilayiti 喀什地区; Kāshí Dìqū (6531 / KSI)		Zepu County	پوسكام ناھىيىسى	Poskam Nahiyisi	Poskam Nahiyisi	泽普县	Zépǔ Xiàn	653124	ZEP
Kashi Prefecture قەشقەر ۋىلايىتى; Qeshqer Wilayiti; Kaxkar Vilayiti 喀什地区; Kāshí Dìqū (6531 / KSI)		Shache County	يەكەن ناھىيىسى	Yeken Nahiyisi	Yakan Nahiyisi	莎车县	Shāchē Xiàn	653125	SHC
Kashi Prefecture قەشقەر ۋىلايىتى; Qeshqer Wilayiti; Kaxkar Vilayiti 喀什地区; Kāshí Dìqū (6531 / KSI)		Yecheng County (Note: Some of the border regions are claimed or controlled by the PRC, also claimed or controlled by India. For more information see Sino-Indian border dispute.)	قاغىلىق ناھىيىسى	Qaghiliq Nahiyisi	Kagilik Nahiyisi	叶城县	Yèchéng Xiàn	653126	YEC
Kashi Prefecture قەشقەر ۋىلايىتى; Qeshqer Wilayiti; Kaxkar Vilayiti 喀什地区; Kāshí Dìqū (6531 / KSI)		Makit County	مەكىت ناھىيىسى	Mekit Nahiyisi	Makit Nahiyisi	麦盖提县	Màigàití Xiàn	653127	MAR
Kashi Prefecture قەشقەر ۋىلايىتى; Qeshqer Wilayiti; Kaxkar Vilayiti 喀什地区; Kāshí Dìqū (6531 / KSI)		Yopurga County	يوپۇرغا ناھىيىسى	Yopurgha Nahiyisi	Yopurga Nahiyisi	岳普湖县	Yuèpǔhú Xiàn	653128	YOP
Kashi Prefecture قەشقەر ۋىلايىتى; Qeshqer Wilayiti; Kaxkar Vilayiti 喀什地区; Kāshí Dìqū (6531 / KSI)		Jiashi County	پەيزىۋات ناھىيىسى	Peyziwat Nahiyisi	Payzivat Nahiyisi	伽师县	Jiāshī Xiàn (Note: not Gāshī)	653129	JSI
Kashi Prefecture قەشقەر ۋىلايىتى; Qeshqer Wilayiti; Kaxkar Vilayiti 喀什地区; Kāshí Dìqū (6531 / KSI)		Bachu County	مارالبېشى ناھىيىسى	Maralbeshi Nahiyisi	Maralbexi Nahiyisi	巴楚县	Bāchǔ Xiàn	653130	BCX
Kashi Prefecture قەشقەر ۋىلايىتى; Qeshqer Wilayiti; Kaxkar Vilayiti 喀什地区; Kāshí Dìqū (6531 / KSI)		Taxkorgan County (Note: Conventional name: Taxkorgan Tajik Autonomous County; UEY: تاشقۇرغان تاجىك ئاپتونوم ناھىيىسى; ULY: Tashqurqan Tajik Aptonom Nahiyisi; SASM/GNC (broad): Taxkurkan Tajik Aptonom Nahiyisi; Chinese: 塔什库尔干塔吉克自治县; pinyin: Tǎshíkù'ěrgān Tǎjíkè Zìzhìxiàn)	تاشقۇرغان ناھىيىسى	Tashqurqan Nahiyisi	Taxkurkan Nahiyisi	塔什库尔干县	Tǎshíkù'ěrgān Xiàn	653131	TXK
Hotan Prefecture خوتەن ۋىلايىتى; Hoten Wilayiti; Hotan Vilayiti 和田地区; Hétián Dìqū (6532 / HOD)		Hotan city	خوتەن شەھىرى	Hoten Shehiri	Hotan Xahiri	和田市	Hétián Shì	653201	HTS
Hotan Prefecture خوتەن ۋىلايىتى; Hoten Wilayiti; Hotan Vilayiti 和田地区; Hétián Dìqū (6532 / HOD)		Hotan County	خوتەن ناھىيىسى	Hoten Nahiyisi	Hotan Nahiyisi	和田县	Hétián Xiàn	653221	HOT
Hotan Prefecture خوتەن ۋىلايىتى; Hoten Wilayiti; Hotan Vilayiti 和田地区; Hétián Dìqū (6532 / HOD)		Moyu County	قاراقاش ناھىيىسى	Qaraqash Nahiyisi	Karakax Nahiyisi	墨玉县	Mòyù Xiàn	653222	MOY
Hotan Prefecture خوتەن ۋىلايىتى; Hoten Wilayiti; Hotan Vilayiti 和田地区; Hétián Dìqū (6532 / HOD)		Pishan County	گۇما ناھىيىسى	Guma Nahiyisi	Guma Nahiyisi	皮山县	Píshān Xiàn	653223	PSA
Hotan Prefecture خوتەن ۋىلايىتى; Hoten Wilayiti; Hotan Vilayiti 和田地区; Hétián Dìqū (6532 / HOD)		Lop County	لوپ ناھىيىسى	Lop Nahiyisi	Lop Nahiyisi	洛浦县	Luòpǔ Xiàn	653224	LOP
Hotan Prefecture خوتەن ۋىلايىتى; Hoten Wilayiti; Hotan Vilayiti 和田地区; Hétián Dìqū (6532 / HOD)		Qira County	چىرا ناھىيىسى	Chira Nahiyisi	Qira Nahiyisi	策勒县	Cèlè Xiàn	653225	QIR
Hotan Prefecture خوتەن ۋىلايىتى; Hoten Wilayiti; Hotan Vilayiti 和田地区; Hétián Dìqū (6532 / HOD)		Yutian County	كېرىيە ناھىيىسى	Këriye Nahiyisi	Keriya Nahiyisi	于田县	Yútián Xiàn	653226	YUT
Hotan Prefecture خوتەن ۋىلايىتى; Hoten Wilayiti; Hotan Vilayiti 和田地区; Hétián Dìqū (6532 / HOD)		Minfeng County	نىيە ناھىيىسى	Niye Nahiyisi	Niya Nahiyisi	民丰县	Mínfēng Xiàn	653227	MFG
Hotan Prefecture خوتەن ۋىلايىتى; Hoten Wilayiti; Hotan Vilayiti 和田地区; Hétián Dìqū (6532 / HOD)		He'an County	قىزىليۇلغۇن ناھىيىسى	Qizilyulghun Nahiyisi	Qizilyulghun Nahiyisi	和安县	Hé'ān Xiàn	653228	
Hotan Prefecture خوتەن ۋىلايىتى; Hoten Wilayiti; Hotan Vilayiti 和田地区; Hétián Dìqū (6532 / HOD)		Hekang County	سەيدۇللا ناھىيىسى	Seydulla Nahiyisi	Seydulla Nahiyisi	和康县	Hékāng Xiàn	653229	
Ili Prefecture (Note: Conventional name: Ili Kazakh Autonomous Prefecture; UEY: ئىلى قازاق ئاپتونوم ئوبلاستى; ULY: Ili Qazaq Aptonom Oblasti; SASM/GNC (broad): Ili Kazak Aptonom Oblasti; Chinese: 伊犁哈萨克自治州; pinyin: Yīlí Hāsàkè Zìzhìzhōu) ئىلى ئوبلاستى; Ili Oblasti; Ili Oblasti 伊犁州; Yīlí Zhōu (Sub-provincial) (6540 / ILD)		Yining city	غۇلجا شەھىرى	Ghulja Shehiri	Gulja Xahiri	伊宁市	Yīníng Shì	654002	YIN
Ili Prefecture ئىلى ئوبلاستى; Ili Oblasti; Ili Oblasti 伊犁州; Yīlí Zhōu (Sub-provincial) (6540 / ILD)		Kuytun city	كۈيتۇن شەھىرى	Küytun Shehiri	Küytun Xahiri	奎屯市	Kuítún Shì	654003	KUY
Ili Prefecture ئىلى ئوبلاستى; Ili Oblasti; Ili Oblasti 伊犁州; Yīlí Zhōu (Sub-provincial) (6540 / ILD)		Korgas city	قورعاس شەھىرى	Qorgas Shehiri	Korgas Xahiri	霍尔果斯市	Huò'ěrguǒsī Shì	654004	HER
Ili Prefecture ئىلى ئوبلاستى; Ili Oblasti; Ili Oblasti 伊犁州; Yīlí Zhōu (Sub-provincial) (6540 / ILD)		Yining County	غۇلجا ناھىيىسى	Ghulja Nahiyisi	Gulja Nahiyisi	伊宁县	Yīníng Xiàn	654021	YNI
Ili Prefecture ئىلى ئوبلاستى; Ili Oblasti; Ili Oblasti 伊犁州; Yīlí Zhōu (Sub-provincial) (6540 / ILD)		Qapqal County (Note: Conventional name: Qapqal Xibe Autonomous County; UEY: چاپچال شىبە ئاپتونوم ناھىيىسى; ULY: Chapchal Shibe Aptonom Nahiyisi; SASM/GNC (broad): Qapqal Xiba Aptonom Nahiyisi; Chinese: 察布查尔锡伯自治县; pinyin: Chábùchá'ěr Xībó Zìzhìxiàn)	چاپچال ناھىيىسى	Chapchal Nahiyisi	Qapqal Nahiyisi	察布查尔县	Chábùchá'ěr Xiàn	654022	QAP
Ili Prefecture ئىلى ئوبلاستى; Ili Oblasti; Ili Oblasti 伊犁州; Yīlí Zhōu (Sub-provincial) (6540 / ILD)		Huocheng County	قورغاس ناھىيىسى	Qorghas Nahiyisi	Korgas Nahiyisi	霍城县	Huòchéng Xiàn	654023	HCX
Ili Prefecture ئىلى ئوبلاستى; Ili Oblasti; Ili Oblasti 伊犁州; Yīlí Zhōu (Sub-provincial) (6540 / ILD)		Gongliu County	توققۇزتارا ناھىيىسى	Toqquztara Nahiyisi	Tokkuztara Nahiyisi	巩留县	Gǒngliú Xiàn	654024	GLX
Ili Prefecture ئىلى ئوبلاستى; Ili Oblasti; Ili Oblasti 伊犁州; Yīlí Zhōu (Sub-provincial) (6540 / ILD)		Xinyuan County	كۈنەس ناھىيىسى	Künes Nahiyisi	Künas Nahiyisi	新源县	Xīnyuán Xiàn	654025	XYT
Ili Prefecture ئىلى ئوبلاستى; Ili Oblasti; Ili Oblasti 伊犁州; Yīlí Zhōu (Sub-provincial) (6540 / ILD)		Zhaosu County	موڭغۇلكۈرە ناھىيىسى	Mongghulküre Nahiyisi	Monggulküra Nahiyisi	昭苏县	Zhāosū Xiàn	654026	ZSX
Ili Prefecture ئىلى ئوبلاستى; Ili Oblasti; Ili Oblasti 伊犁州; Yīlí Zhōu (Sub-provincial) (6540 / ILD)		Tekes County	تېكەس ناھىيىسى	Tëkes Nahiyisi	Tekas Nahiyisi	特克斯县	Tèkèsī Xiàn	654027	TEK
Ili Prefecture ئىلى ئوبلاستى; Ili Oblasti; Ili Oblasti 伊犁州; Yīlí Zhōu (Sub-provincial) (6540 / ILD)		Nilka County	نىلقا ناھىيسى	Nilqa Nahiyisi	Nilka Nahiyisi	尼勒克县	Nílèkè Xiàn	654028	NIL
Ili Prefecture ئىلى ئوبلاستى; Ili Oblasti; Ili Oblasti 伊犁州; Yīlí Zhōu (Sub-provincial) (6540 / ILD)	Tacheng Prefecture تارباغاتاي ۋىلايىتى; Tarbaghatay Wilayiti; Tarbagatay Vilayiti 塔城地区; Tǎchéng Dìqū (6542 / TCD)	Tacheng city	چۆچەك شەھىرى	Chöchek Shehiri	Qoqak Xahiri	塔城市	Tǎchéng Shì	654201	TCS
Ili Prefecture ئىلى ئوبلاستى; Ili Oblasti; Ili Oblasti 伊犁州; Yīlí Zhōu (Sub-provincial) (6540 / ILD)	Tacheng Prefecture تارباغاتاي ۋىلايىتى; Tarbaghatay Wilayiti; Tarbagatay Vilayiti 塔城地区; Tǎchéng Dìqū (6542 / TCD)	Usu city	ۋۇسۇ شەھىرى	Usu Shehiri	Usu Xahiri	乌苏市	Wūsū Shì	654202	USU
Ili Prefecture ئىلى ئوبلاستى; Ili Oblasti; Ili Oblasti 伊犁州; Yīlí Zhōu (Sub-provincial) (6540 / ILD)	Tacheng Prefecture تارباغاتاي ۋىلايىتى; Tarbaghatay Wilayiti; Tarbagatay Vilayiti 塔城地区; Tǎchéng Dìqū (6542 / TCD)	Shawan city	ساۋەن شەھىرى	Sawen Shehiri	Savan Xahiri	沙湾市	Shāwān Shì	654203	SWX
Ili Prefecture ئىلى ئوبلاستى; Ili Oblasti; Ili Oblasti 伊犁州; Yīlí Zhōu (Sub-provincial) (6540 / ILD)	Tacheng Prefecture تارباغاتاي ۋىلايىتى; Tarbaghatay Wilayiti; Tarbagatay Vilayiti 塔城地区; Tǎchéng Dìqū (6542 / TCD)	Emin County	دۆربىلجىن ناھىيىسى	Dorbiljin Nahiyisi	Dörbiljin Nahiyisi	额敏县	Émǐn Xiàn	654221	EMN
Ili Prefecture ئىلى ئوبلاستى; Ili Oblasti; Ili Oblasti 伊犁州; Yīlí Zhōu (Sub-provincial) (6540 / ILD)	Tacheng Prefecture تارباغاتاي ۋىلايىتى; Tarbaghatay Wilayiti; Tarbagatay Vilayiti 塔城地区; Tǎchéng Dìqū (6542 / TCD)	Toli County	تولى ناھىيىسى	Toli Nahiyisi	Toli Nahiyisi	托里县	Tuōlǐ Xiàn	654224	TLI
Ili Prefecture ئىلى ئوبلاستى; Ili Oblasti; Ili Oblasti 伊犁州; Yīlí Zhōu (Sub-provincial) (6540 / ILD)	Tacheng Prefecture تارباغاتاي ۋىلايىتى; Tarbaghatay Wilayiti; Tarbagatay Vilayiti 塔城地区; Tǎchéng Dìqū (6542 / TCD)	Yumin County	چاغانتوقاي ناھىيىسى	Chaghantoqay Nahiyisi	Qagantokay Nahiyisi	裕民县	Yùmín Xiàn	654225	YMN
Ili Prefecture ئىلى ئوبلاستى; Ili Oblasti; Ili Oblasti 伊犁州; Yīlí Zhōu (Sub-provincial) (6540 / ILD)	Tacheng Prefecture تارباغاتاي ۋىلايىتى; Tarbaghatay Wilayiti; Tarbagatay Vilayiti 塔城地区; Tǎchéng Dìqū (6542 / TCD)	Hoboksar County (Note: Conventional name: Hoboksar Mongol Autonomous County; UEY: قوبۇقسار موڭغۇل ئاپتونوم ناھىيىسى; ULY: Qobuqsar Mongghul Aptonom Nahiyisi; SASM/GNC (broad): Kobuksar Mongĝul Aptonom Nahiyisi; Chinese: 和布克赛尔蒙古自治县; pinyin: Hébùkèsài'ěr Měnggǔ Zìzhìxiàn)	قوبۇقسار ناھىيىسى	Qobuqsar Nahiyisi	Kobuksar Nahiyisi	和布克赛尔县	Hébùkèsài'ěr Xiàn	654226	HOB
Ili Prefecture ئىلى ئوبلاستى; Ili Oblasti; Ili Oblasti 伊犁州; Yīlí Zhōu (Sub-provincial) (6540 / ILD)	Altay Prefecture ئالتاي ۋىلايىتى; Altay Wilayiti; Altay Vilayiti 阿勒泰地区; Ālètài Dìqū (6543 / ALD)	Altay city	ئالتاي شەھىرى	Altay Shehiri	Altay Xahiri	阿勒泰市	Ālètài Shì	654301	ALT
Ili Prefecture ئىلى ئوبلاستى; Ili Oblasti; Ili Oblasti 伊犁州; Yīlí Zhōu (Sub-provincial) (6540 / ILD)	Altay Prefecture ئالتاي ۋىلايىتى; Altay Wilayiti; Altay Vilayiti 阿勒泰地区; Ālètài Dìqū (6543 / ALD)	Burqin County	بۇرچىن ناھىيىسى	Burchin Nahiyisi	Burqin Nahiyisi	布尔津县	Bù'ěrjīn Xiàn	654321	BUX
Ili Prefecture ئىلى ئوبلاستى; Ili Oblasti; Ili Oblasti 伊犁州; Yīlí Zhōu (Sub-provincial) (6540 / ILD)	Altay Prefecture ئالتاي ۋىلايىتى; Altay Wilayiti; Altay Vilayiti 阿勒泰地区; Ālètài Dìqū (6543 / ALD)	Fuyun County	خْكتْكاَي ناھىيىسى	Koktokay Nahiyisi	Koktokay Nahiyisi	富蕴县	Fùyùn Xiàn	654322	FYN
Ili Prefecture ئىلى ئوبلاستى; Ili Oblasti; Ili Oblasti 伊犁州; Yīlí Zhōu (Sub-provincial) (6540 / ILD)	Altay Prefecture ئالتاي ۋىلايىتى; Altay Wilayiti; Altay Vilayiti 阿勒泰地区; Ālètài Dìqū (6543 / ALD)	Fuhai County	بۇرۇلتوقاي ناھىيىسى	Burultoqay Nahiyisi	Burultok̂ay Nahiyisi	福海县	Fúhǎi Xiàn	654323	FHI
Ili Prefecture ئىلى ئوبلاستى; Ili Oblasti; Ili Oblasti 伊犁州; Yīlí Zhōu (Sub-provincial) (6540 / ILD)	Altay Prefecture ئالتاي ۋىلايىتى; Altay Wilayiti; Altay Vilayiti 阿勒泰地区; Ālètài Dìqū (6543 / ALD)	Habahe County	قابا ناھىيىسى	Qaba Nahiyisi	Kaba Nahiyisi	哈巴河县	Hābāhé Xiàn	654324	HBH
Ili Prefecture ئىلى ئوبلاستى; Ili Oblasti; Ili Oblasti 伊犁州; Yīlí Zhōu (Sub-provincial) (6540 / ILD)	Altay Prefecture ئالتاي ۋىلايىتى; Altay Wilayiti; Altay Vilayiti 阿勒泰地区; Ālètài Dìqū (6543 / ALD)	Qinghe County	چىڭگىل ناھىيىسى	Chinggil Nahiyisi	Qinggil Nahiyisi	青河县	Qīnghé Xiàn	654325	QHX
Ili Prefecture ئىلى ئوبلاستى; Ili Oblasti; Ili Oblasti 伊犁州; Yīlí Zhōu (Sub-provincial) (6540 / ILD)	Altay Prefecture ئالتاي ۋىلايىتى; Altay Wilayiti; Altay Vilayiti 阿勒泰地区; Ālètài Dìqū (6543 / ALD)	Jeminay County	جېمىنەي ناھىيىسى	Jëminey Nahiyisi	Jeminay Nahiyisi	吉木乃县	Jímùnǎi Xiàn	654326	JEM
Direct administration Xinjiang Production and Construction Corps شىنجاڭ ئىشلەپچىقىرىش - قۇرۇلۇش بىڭتۇەنى 新疆生产建设兵团 (6590)		Shihezi city	شىخەنزە شەھىرى	Shixenze Shehiri	Xihanza Xahiri	石河子市	Shíhézǐ Shì	659001	SHZ
Direct administration Xinjiang Production and Construction Corps شىنجاڭ ئىشلەپچىقىرىش - قۇرۇلۇش بىڭتۇەنى 新疆生产建设兵团 (6590)		Aral city	ئارال شەھىرى	Aral Shehiri	Aral Xahiri	阿拉尔市	Ālā'ěr Shì	659002	ALS
Direct administration Xinjiang Production and Construction Corps شىنجاڭ ئىشلەپچىقىرىش - قۇرۇلۇش بىڭتۇەنى 新疆生产建设兵团 (6590)		Tumxuk city	تۇمشۇق شەھىرى	Tumshuq Shehiri	Tumxuk Xahiri	图木舒克市	Túmùshūkè Shì	659003	TMK
Direct administration Xinjiang Production and Construction Corps شىنجاڭ ئىشلەپچىقىرىش - قۇرۇلۇش بىڭتۇەنى 新疆生产建设兵团 (6590)		Wujiaqu city	ۋۇجياچۈ شەھىرى	Wujyachü Shehiri	Wujyaqü Xahiri	五家渠市	Wǔjiāqú Shì	659004	WJS
Direct administration Xinjiang Production and Construction Corps شىنجاڭ ئىشلەپچىقىرىش - قۇرۇلۇش بىڭتۇەنى 新疆生产建设兵团 (6590)		Beitun city	بەيتۈن شەھىرى	Beatün Shehiri	Baatün Xahiri	北屯市	Běitún Shì	659005	BTN
Direct administration Xinjiang Production and Construction Corps شىنجاڭ ئىشلەپچىقىرىش - قۇرۇلۇش بىڭتۇەنى 新疆生产建设兵团 (6590)		Tiemenguan city	باشئەگىم شەھىرى	Bashegym Shehiri	Baxagym Xahiri	铁门关市	Tiĕménguān Shì	659006	TMG
Direct administration Xinjiang Production and Construction Corps شىنجاڭ ئىشلەپچىقىرىش - قۇرۇلۇش بىڭتۇەنى 新疆生产建设兵团 (6590)		Shuanghe city	قوشئۆگۈز شەھىرى	Qoshögüz Shehiri	Koxogüz Xahiri	双河市	Shuānghé Shì	659007	SHB
Direct administration Xinjiang Production and Construction Corps شىنجاڭ ئىشلەپچىقىرىش - قۇرۇلۇش بىڭتۇەنى 新疆生产建设兵团 (6590)		Kokdala city	كۆكدالا شەھىرى	Kökdala Shehiri	Kokdala Xahiri	可克达拉市	Kěkèdálā Shì	659008	KKD
Direct administration Xinjiang Production and Construction Corps شىنجاڭ ئىشلەپچىقىرىش - قۇرۇلۇش بىڭتۇەنى 新疆生产建设兵团 (6590)		Kunyu city	قۇرۇمقاش شەھىرى	Qurumqash Shehiri	Kurumkax Xahiri	昆玉市	Kūnyù Shì	659009	KYU
Direct administration Xinjiang Production and Construction Corps شىنجاڭ ئىشلەپچىقىرىش - قۇرۇلۇش بىڭتۇەنى 新疆生产建设兵团 (6590)		Huyanghe city	خۇياڭخې شەھىرى	Xuyangxë Shehiri	Huyanghe Xahiri	胡杨河市	Húyánghé Shì	659010	
Direct administration Xinjiang Production and Construction Corps شىنجاڭ ئىشلەپچىقىرىش - قۇرۇلۇش بىڭتۇەنى 新疆生产建设兵团 (6590)		Xinxing city	يېڭى يۇلتۇز شەھىرى	Yengi Yultuz Shehiri	Yengi Yultuz Xahiri	新星市	Xīnxīng Shì	659011	
Direct administration Xinjiang Production and Construction Corps شىنجاڭ ئىشلەپچىقىرىش - قۇرۇلۇش بىڭتۇەنى 新疆生产建设兵团 (6590)		Baiyang city	بەيياڭ شەھىرى	Beyyang Shehiri	Bäyyang Xäĥiri	白杨市	Baíyáng Shì	659012	
Direct administration Xinjiang Production and Construction Corps شىنجاڭ ئىشلەپچىقىرىش - قۇرۇلۇش بىڭتۇەنى 新疆生产建设兵团 (6590)		Caohu city				草湖市	Cǎohú Shì		

== Recent changes in administrative divisions ==
Date	Before	After	Note	Reference
1982-02-06	provincial-controlled	Karamay (P-City)	established	
1982-02-06	↳ Karamay (PC-City)	Karamay (P-City)	disestablished	
1983-01-18	all Province-controlled city (P-City) → Prefecture-level city (PL-City)			Civil Affairs Announcement
1983-01-18	all Prefecture-controlled city (PC-City) → County-level city (CL-City)			Civil Affairs Announcement
1983-07-21	Changji County	Changji (CL-City)	reorganized	
1983-08-19	Aksu County	Aksu (CL-City)	reorganized	
1983-08-19	parts of Wensu County	Aksu (CL-City)	merged into	
1983-08-19	Korla County	Korla (CL-City)	merged into	
1983-09-09	Hami County	Hami (CL-City)	merged into	
1983-09-09	parts of Hotan County	Hotan (CL-City)	established	
1984-09-14	Ili Prefecture (Aut.)	★ Ili Prefecture	reorganized & subordinated to Ili Prefecture (Aut.)	
1984-09-14	Tacheng Prefecture	☆ Tacheng Prefecture	reorganized & subordinated to Ili Prefecture (Aut.)	
1984-09-14	Altay Prefecture	☆ Altay Prefecture	reorganized & subordinated to Ili Prefecture (Aut.)	
1984-11-17	Tacheng County	Tacheng (CL-City)	reorganized	
1984-11-17	Altay County	Altay (CL-City)	reorganized	
1984-12-26	Turpan County	Turpan (CL-City)	reorganized	
1985-06-24	Bole County	Bole (CL-City)	reorganized	
1986-06-07	Artux County	Artux (CL-City)	reorganized	
1986-06-07	parts of Ürümqi County	Dongshan District	established	
1996-07-10	Wusu County	Wusu (CL-City)	reorganized	Civil Affairs [1996]47
1996-12-30	Miquan County	Miquan (CL-City)	reorganized	Civil Affairs [1996]89
1999-08-10	Nanshan Kuang District	Nanquan District	renamed	
2001-01-13	parts of Ürümqi County	Tianshan District	merged into	State Council [2001]7
2001-01-13	parts of Ürümqi County	Saybagh District	merged into	State Council [2001]7
2001-01-13	parts of Ürümqi County	Xinshi District	merged into	State Council [2001]7
2001-01-13	parts of Ürümqi County	Shuimogou District	merged into	State Council [2001]7
2001-01-13	parts of Ürümqi County	Toutunhe District	merged into	State Council [2001]7
2001-01-13	parts of Ürümqi County	Dongshan District	merged into	State Council [2001]7
2001-10-06	★ Ili Prefecture	★ Ili Prefecture (Aut.)	reorganized	State Council [2001]125
2002-03-09	parts of Tianshan District	Dabancheng District	merged into	State Council [2002]20
2002-03-09	Nanquan District	Dabancheng District	renamed	State Council [2002]20
2002-09-17	parts of Aksu Prefecture	provincial-controlled (XPCC)	transferred	State Council [2002]81
2002-09-17	↳ parts of Aksu (CL-City)	↳ Aral (CL-City — XPCC)	established	State Council [2002]81
2002-09-17	parts of Kashgar Prefecture	provincial-controlled (XPCC)	transferred	State Council [2002]82
2002-09-17	↳ parts of Maralbexi County	↳ Tumxuk (CL-City — XPCC)	established	State Council [2002]82
2002-09-17	parts of Changji Prefecture (Aut.)	provincial-controlled (XPCC)	transferred	State Council [2002]83
2002-09-17	↳ parts of Changji (CL-City)	↳ Wujiaqu (CL-City — XPCC)	established	State Council [2002]83
2007-06-30	parts of Changji Prefecture (Aut.)	Ürümqi (PL-City)	transferred	State Council [2007]65
2007-06-30	↳ Miquan (CL-City)	↳ Midong District	transferred & established	State Council [2007]65
2007-06-30	Dongshan District	Midong District	merged into	State Council [2007]65
2011-12-20	★ parts of Ili Prefecture (Aut.)	provincial-controlled (XPCC)	transferred	State Council [2011]161
2011-12-20	☆ parts of Altay Prefecture	provincial-controlled (XPCC)	transferred	State Council [2011]161
2011-12-20	↳ parts of Altay (CL-City)	↳ Beitun (CL-City — XPCC)	established	State Council [2011]161
2012-12-17	parts of Bole (CL-City)	Alashankou (CL-City)	established	State Council [2012]205
2012-12-17	parts of Jinghe County	Alashankou (CL-City)	established	State Council [2012]205
2012-12-17	parts of Bayingolin Prefecture (Aut.)	provincial-controlled (XPCC)	transferred	State Council [2012]206
2012-12-17	↳ parts of Korla (CL-City)	↳ Tiemenguan (CL-City — XPCC)	established	State Council [2012]206
2014-01-25	parts of Bortala Prefecture (Aut.)	provincial-controlled (XPCC)	transferred	State Council [2014]15
2014-01-25	↳ parts of Bole (CL-City)	↳ Shuanghe (CL-City — XPCC)	established	State Council [2014]15
2014-06-26	parts of Huocheng County	Korgas (CL-City)	established	State Council [2014]80
2015-03-16	Turpan Prefecture	Turpan (PL-City)	reorganized	State Council [2015]52
2015-03-16	Turpan (CL-City)	Gaochang District	reorganized	State Council [2015]52
2015-03-16	★ parts of Ili Prefecture (Aut.)	provincial-controlled (XPCC)	transferred	State Council [2015]53
2015-03-16	↳ parts of Huocheng County	↳ Kokdala (CL-City — XPCC)	established	State Council [2015]53
2015-03-16	↳ parts of Qapqal County (Aut.)	↳ Kokdala (CL-City — XPCC)	established	State Council [2015]53
2016-01-07	Hami Prefecture	Hami (PL-City)	reorganized	State Council [2016]9
2016-01-07	Hami (CL-City)	Yizhou District	reorganized	State Council [2016]9
2016-01-07	parts of Hotan Prefecture	provincial-controlled (XPCC)	transferred	State Council [2016]10
2016-01-07	↳ parts of Karakax County	↳ Kunyu (CL-City — XPCC)	established	State Council [2016]10
2019-11-06	parts of Tacheng Prefecture	provincial-controlled (XPCC)	transferred	State Council [2019]107
2019-11-06	↳ parts of Toli County	↳ Huyanghe (CL-City — XPCC)	established	State Council [2019]107
2019-11-20	Kuqa County	Kuqa (CL-City)	reorganized	Civil Affairs [2019]123
2021-02-04	↳ parts of Hami (PC-City)	↳ Xinxing (CL-City — XPCC)	established	
2023-01-20	↳ parts of Tacheng Prefecture	↳ Baiyang (CL-City — XPCC)	established	
2026-04-17	↳ parts of Tumxuk (CL-City — XPCC)	↳ Caohu (CL-City — XPCC)	established	

== Population composition ==
=== Prefectures ===
Prefecture	2010	2000
Altay	603,283	561,667
Bortala	443,680	424,040
Tacheng	1,219,212	
Karamay	391,008	270,232
Changji	1,428,587	1,331,929
Ürümqi	3,112,559	2,081,834
Turpan	622,903	550,731
Hami	572,400	492,096
Ili	2,482,592	2,209,623
Kizilsu	525,599	
Kashgar	3,979,321	3,405,713
Aksu	2,370,809	1,980,354
Hotan	2,014,362	1,681,310
Bayingolin	1,278,486	1,056,970

=== Counties ===
Name	Prefecture	2010
Tianshan	Ürümqi	696,277
Saybagh	Ürümqi	664,716
Xinshi	Ürümqi	730,307
Shuimogou	Ürümqi	390,943
Toutunhe	Ürümqi	172,796
Dabancheng	Ürümqi	40,657
Midong	Ürümqi	333,676
Ürümqi	Ürümqi	83,187
Karamay	Karamay	261,445
Dushanzi	Karamay	69,361
Baijiantan	Karamay	50,422
Urho	Karamay	9,780
Gaochang	Turpan	273,385
Piqan	Turpan	231,297
Toksun	Turpan	118,221
Yizhou	Hami	472,175
Yiwu	Hami	24,783
Barkol	Hami	75,442
Kashgar	Kashgar	506,640
Shufu	Kashgar	311,960
Shule	Kashgar	312,455
Yengisar	Kashgar	262,067
Poskam	Kashgar	206,936
Yarkand	Kashgar	762,385
Kargilik	Kashgar	454,328
Makit	Kashgar	258,978
Yopurga	Kashgar	147,688
Peyziwat	Kashgar	381,767
Maralbexi	Kashgar	336,274
Taxkorgan	Kashgar	37,843
Hotan(shi)	Hotan	322,300
Hotan(xian)	Hotan	269,941
Karakash	Hotan	500,114
Pishan	Hotan	258,210
Lop	Hotan	232,916
Chira	Hotan	147,050
Keriye	Hotan	249,899
Minfeng	Hotan	33,932
Tacheng	Tacheng	163,606
Wusu	Tacheng	215,430
Emin	Tacheng	207,735
Shawan	Tacheng	206,968
Toli	Tacheng	93,896
Yumin	Tacheng	55,507
Hoboksar	Tacheng	51,634
Altay	Altay	19,0064
Burqin	Altay	66,758
Fuyun	Altay	87,886
Fuhai	Altay	81,845
Habahe	Altay	82,507
Qinggil	Altay	58,858
Jeminay	Altay	35,365
Changji	Changji	426,253
Fukang	Changji	165,006
Hutubi	Changji	210,201
Manas	Changji	237,558
Qitai	Changji	210,566
Jimsar	Changji	113,284
Mori	Changji	65,719
Bole	Bortala	259,557
Alashankou	Bortala	not established
Jinghe	Bortala	139,661
Wenquan	Bortala	73,700
Korla	Bayin'gholin	549,324
Luntai	Bayin'gholin	116,166
Yuli	Bayin'gholin	96,068
Ruoqiang	Bayin'gholin	35,580
Qiemo	Bayin'gholin	65,572
Hejing	Bayin'gholin	160,804
Hoxud	Bayin'gholin	72,556
Bohu	Bayin'gholin	54,788
Yanqi	Bayin'gholin	127,628
Aksu	Aksu	535,657
Wensu	Aksu	233,933
Kuchar	Aksu	462,588
Shayar	Aksu	257,502
Toksu	Aksu	172,064
Baicheng	Aksu	229,252
Uqturpan	Aksu	197,990
Awat	Aksu	237,562
Kalpin	Aksu	44,261
Artux	Kizilsu	225,054
Akto	Kizilsu	181,049
Akqi	Kizilsu	39,764
Ulugqat	Kizilsu	54,140
Yining(shi)	Ili	515,082
Yining(xian)	Ili	372,590
Kuitun	Ili	166,261
Korgas (Huocheng)	Ili	not established
Huocheng	Ili	352,689
Gongliu	Ili	164,860
Xinyuan	Ili	282,718
Zhaosu	Ili	148,187
Tekes	Ili	142,718
Nilka	Ili	157,743
Qapqal	Ili	179,744
Shihezi	Direct administration	380,130
Aral	Direct administration	166,205
Tumxuk	Direct administration	213,300
Wujiaqu	Direct administration	72,613
Beitun	Direct administration	not established
Tiemenguan	Direct administration	not established
Shuanghe	Direct administration	not established
Kokdala	Direct administration	not established
Kunyu	Direct administration	not established
Huyanghe	Direct administration	not established
Xinxing	Direct administration	not established
Baiyang	Direct administration	not established
Caohu	Direct administration	not established

== Drafted and proposed cities ==
=== Short-term drafted cities ===
County-level cities under Xinjiang UAR government

- Zhundong (准东市)

County-level cities under XPCC (Bingtuan)

- Wuxing (五星市)
- Yulong (玉龙市)
- Wushishui (乌什水市)

County into county-level cities under Xinjiang UAR government

- Guqung (古城市) ← Qitai [Guqung] County (奇台县)
- Yarkant [Yerqiang] (叶尔羌市) ← [Yarkant] County (莎车县)

=== Mid-term drafted cities ===
County into county-level cities under Xinjiang UAR government

- Sawen (沙湾市) ← Shawan [Sawen] County
- Künes (新源市) ← Xinyuan [Künes] County
- Piqan (鄯善市) ← Shanshan [Piqan] County
- Bügür (轮台市) ← Luntai [Bügür] County
- Hejing (和静市) ← Hejing County
- Qarkilik (若羌市) ← Ruoqiang [Qarkilik] County
- Dörbiljin (额敏市) ← Emin [Dörbiljin] County

=== Long-term drafted cities ===
County into county-level cities under Xinjiang UAR government

- Kargilik (叶城市) ← Yecheng [Kargilik] County
- Bay (拜城市) ← Baicheng [Bay] County
- Uqturpan (乌什市) ← Wushi [Uqturpan] County
- Keriya (于田市) ← Yutian [Keriya] County
- Makit (麦盖提市) ← Maigaiti [Makit] County
- Peyziwat (伽师市) ← Jiashi [Payzawat] County
- Maralbexi (巴楚市) ← Bachu [Maralbexi] County

County-level cities under XPCC (Bingtuan)

- Jinyinchuan (金银川市)
- Fangxin (芳新市)
- Xiayedi (下野地市)
- Tarim (塔里木市)
- Milan (米兰市)
- Nantun (南屯市)
- Beiting (北亭市)
- Qianhai (前海市)
- Mosuowan (莫索湾市)
- Tianger (天格尔市)

=== Proposed cities ===
Proposed prefecture-level cities under Xinjiang UAR government

- Guqung (Prefecture-level city) ← Guqung
- Kuqa [Qiuqi] (Prefecture-level city) ← Kuqa [Qiuqi]
- Yarkant [Yerqiang] (Prefecture-level city) ← Yarkant [Yerqiang]

== Historical divisions ==
In 1954, Xinjiang, while still being administered as a province, comprised 1 administrative region, 10 special districts, 5 autonomous prefectures, 1 provincial-level city, 2 cities, 73 counties, and 6 autonomous counties.

The administrative divisions of Xinjiang in 1954
Prefecture-level cities and special districts	Number of counties and districts	Administrative center	County (seat)
Dihua			
Dihua Special Zone	8 counties, 1 autonomous county	Ürümqi	Fukang County (urban area), Shanshan County (urban area), Qitai County (urban area), Hutubi County (urban area), Turpan County (urban area), Jimsar County (urban area), Manas County (urban area), Toksun County (urban area), Muleihe Kazakh Autonomous County (urban area)
Hami Special Zone	2 counties, 1 autonomous county	Hami County	Hami County (urban area), Yiwu County (urban area), Barkol Kazakh Autonomous County (urban area)
Korla Special Zone	5 counties	Korla County	Korla County (urban area), Yuli County (urban area), Luntai County (urban area), Ruoqiang County (urban area), Qiemo County (urban area)
Southern Xinjiang Administrative Office	1 city, 26 counties, and 1 autonomous county	Kashgar	Kashgar Prefecture (headquartered in Kashgar City): Kashgar City, Shufu County (urban area), Shule County (urban area), Bachu County (urban area), Yingjisha County (urban area), Yuepuhu County (urban area), Jiashi County (urban area), Tashkurgan Tajik Autonomous County (urban area).
Southern Xinjiang Administrative Office	1 city, 26 counties, and 1 autonomous county	Kashgar	Shache Special Zone (based in Shache County): Shache County (urban area), Zepu County (urban area), Yecheng County (urban area), Maigati County (urban area)
Southern Xinjiang Administrative Office	1 city, 26 counties, and 1 autonomous county	Kashgar	Hotan Special District (based in Hotan County): Hotan County (urban area), Ceqin County (urban area), Pishan County (urban area), Minfeng County (urban area), Luopu County (urban area), Yutian County (urban area), Moyu County (urban area)
Southern Xinjiang Administrative Office	1 city, 26 counties, and 1 autonomous county	Kashgar	Aksu Special District (headquartered in Aksu County): Aksu County (urban area), Kuqa County (urban area), Shaya County (urban area), Uqturpan County (urban area), Xinhe County (urban area), Awat County (urban area), Wensu County (urban area), Keping County (urban area), Baicheng County (urban area)
Southern Xinjiang Administrative Office	1 city, 26 counties, and 1 autonomous county	Kashgar	Kizilsu Kyrgyz Autonomous Region (headquartered in Artush County): Artush County (urban area), Wuqia County (urban area), Akqi County (urban area)
Changji Hui Autonomous Prefecture	3 counties	Changji County	Changji County (urban area), Miquan County (urban area), Ürümqi County (urban area)
Bayingolin Mongol Autonomous Prefecture	2 counties, 1 autonomous county	Yanqi Hui Autonomous County	Hejing County (urban area), Heshuo County (urban area), and Yanqi Hui Autonomous County (urban area)
Ili Kazakh Autonomous Prefecture	1 city, 24 counties, 2 autonomous counties	Yining City	Ili Prefecture (headquartered in Yining City): Yining City, Yining County (Yining City), Tekes County (urban area), Suiding County (urban area), Zhaosu County (urban area), Xinyuan County (urban area), Gongliu County (urban area), Huocheng County (urban area), Nileke County (urban area), and Chabuchar Xibe Autonomous County (urban area).
Ili Kazakh Autonomous Prefecture	1 city, 24 counties, 2 autonomous counties	Yining City	Tacheng Special District (located in Tacheng County): Tacheng County (urban area), Shawan County (urban area), Emin County (urban area), Wusu County (urban area), Yumin County (urban area), Tuoli County (urban area), and Hoboksar Mongol Autonomous County (urban area).
Ili Kazakh Autonomous Prefecture	1 city, 24 counties, 2 autonomous counties	Yining City	Altay Special District (headquartered in Altay County): Altay County (urban area), Fuhai County (urban area), Jimunai County (urban area), Qinghe County (urban area), Habahe County (urban area), Fuyun County (urban area), Bulinjin County (urban area).
Ili Kazakh Autonomous Prefecture	1 city, 24 counties, 2 autonomous counties	Yining City	Bortala Mongol Autonomous Region (seat in Bole County): Bole County (urban area), Jinghe County (urban area), Wenquan County (urban area)
