= Karamay (disambiguation) =

Karamay is a prefecture-level city of Xinjiang.

Karamay may also refer to:

- Karamay District, a district of Karamay City
- Karamay (film), a 2010 documentary film

== See also ==
- Kalamay, a Filipino confection
