= Shuimogou Scenic Area =

Scenic location in Shuimogou District, People's Republic of China

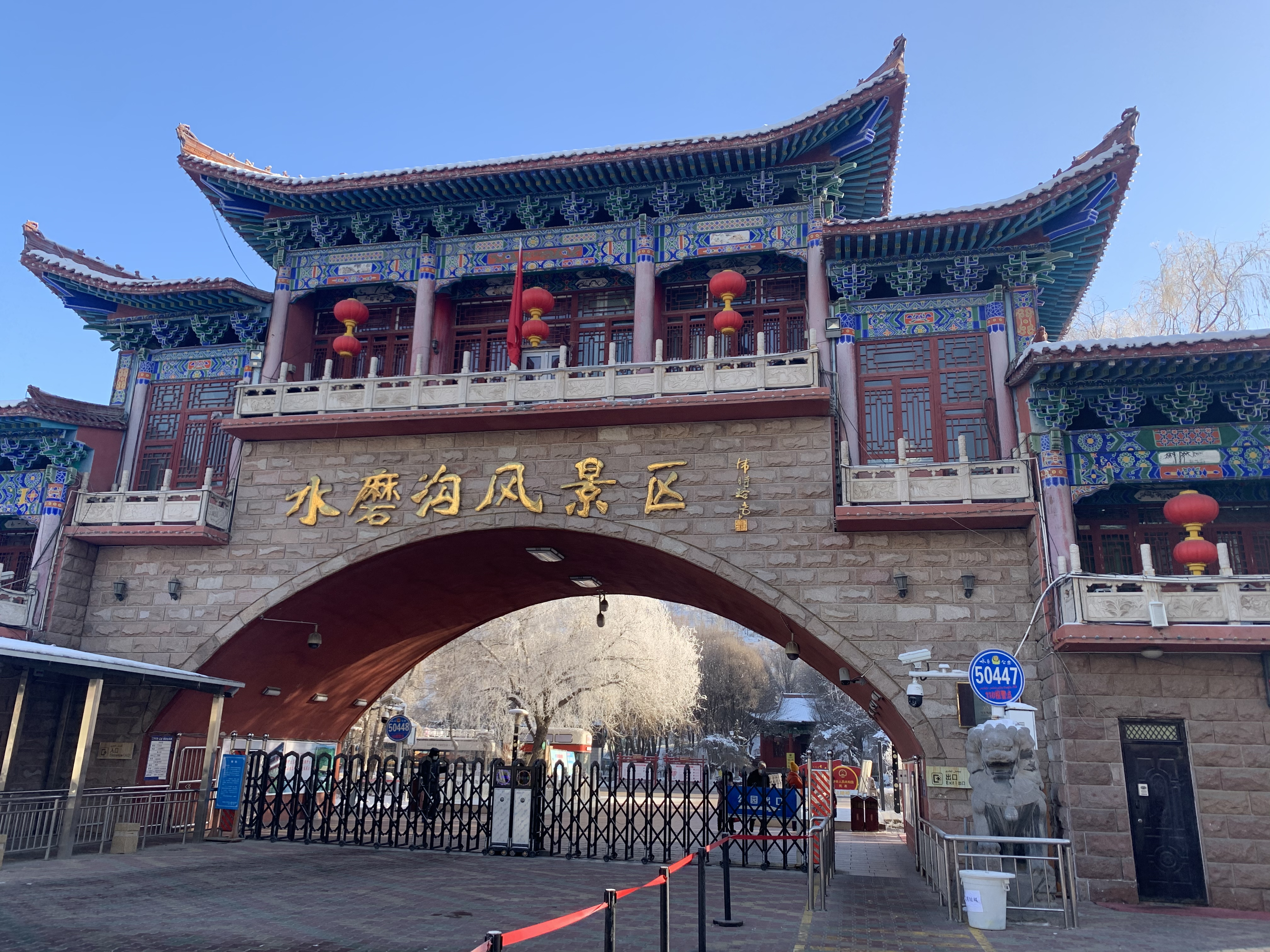
- The Gate of Shuimogou Scenic Area
- Interactive map of Shuimogou Scenic Area
- Location: Shuimogou District, Urumqi City
- Coordinates: 43.8546157°N 87.701087°E
- Area: about 3.7 square kilometers

The Shuimogou Scenic Area (simplified Chinese: 水磨沟风景区; traditional Chinese: 水磨溝風景區), or Shuimogou Scenic Spot, also called Shuimogou Park, is a scenic spot located in Shuimogou District, Urumqi City, Xinjiang Uygur Autonomous Region, People's Republic of China. It consists of "five mountains and one river"-Qingquan Mountain, Hongqiao Mountain, Hot Spring Mountain, Shuita Mountain, Snow Lotus Mountain and Shuimo River. It was established as a tourist attraction in the Qing Dynasty.

The total area of Shuimogou Scenic Area is about 3.7 square kilometers, and it was rated as a National AAAA Tourist Attraction in China by the China National Tourism Administration in 2006.
