= Qingquan Temple =

Buddhist temple in Ürümqi, China

- 清泉寺
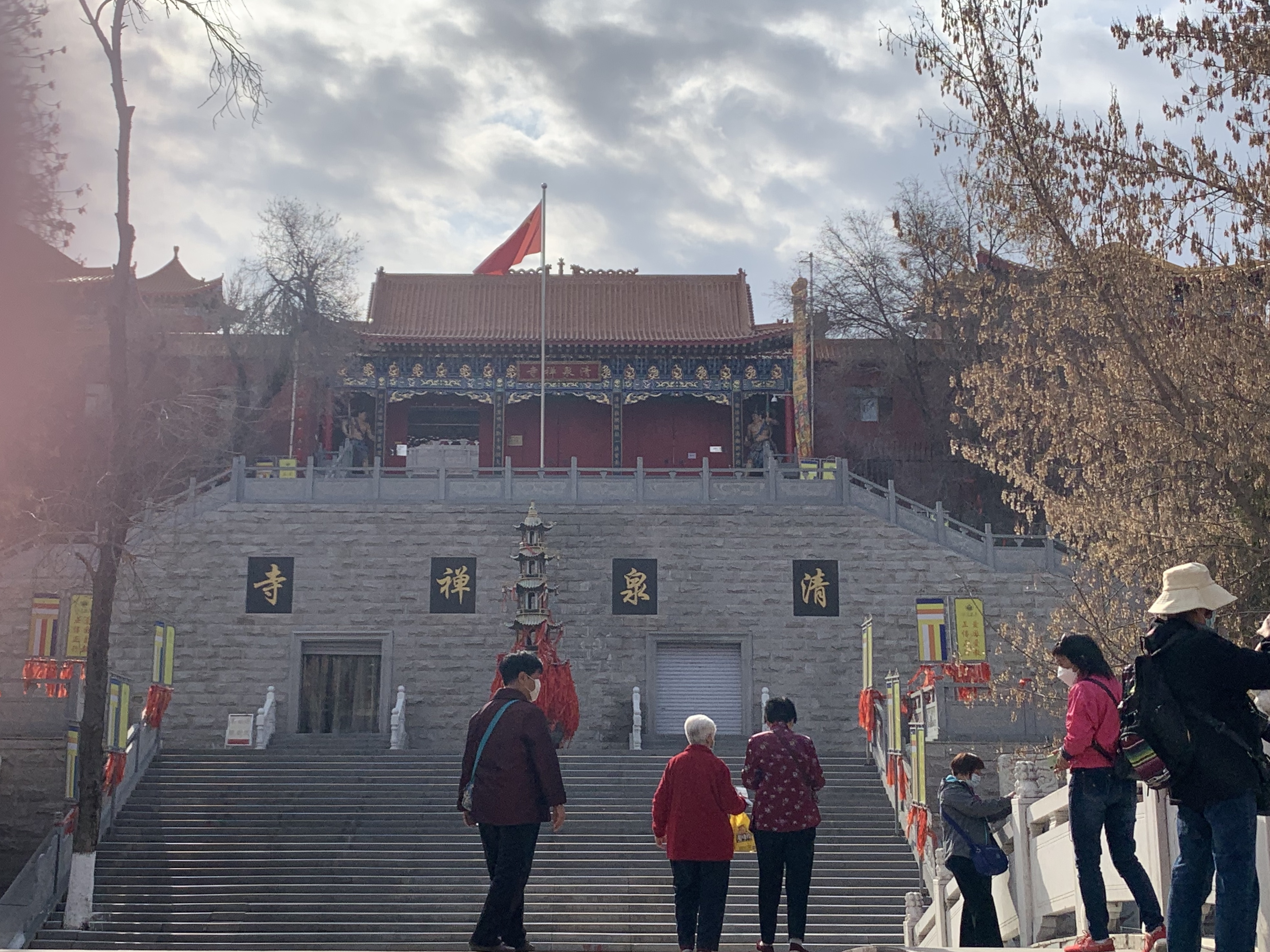
- Qingquan Temple in 2021

- Location within Dzungaria

Religion
- Affiliation: Buddhism
- Sect: Pure Land Buddhism
- Leadership: Shi Jiren (释寂仁)

Location
- Location: Shuimogou District, Ürümqi, Xinjiang, China
- Interactive map of Qingquan Temple
- Coordinates: 43°50′10″N 87°39′58″E

Architecture
- Style: Chinese architecture
- Established: 627–649
- Completed: 1989 (reconstruction)

Qingquan Temple (Chinese: 清泉寺; pinyin: Qīngquán Sì; lit. 'Crystal-Clear Spring Temple') is a Buddhist temple located in Shuimogou District of Ürümqi, Xinjiang, China.

== History ==
The original temple was built between 627 and 649, under the Tang dynasty (618–907). It was completely destroyed by the Red Guards during the ten-year Cultural Revolution.

After the 3rd Plenary Session of the 11th Central Committee of the Chinese Communist Party, the local government decided to rebuild the temple on its original site. Reconstruction of the temple, led by Wang Chengzhang (王成章), commenced in 1988 and was completed in 1998. In the early morning of 29 September 2013, a disastrous fire consumed the Mahavira Hall.

== Architecture ==
Now the existing main buildings include Shanmen, Heavenly Kings Hall, Mahavira Hall, Guanyin Hall, Maitreya Hall, Dharma Hall, Dining Room, etc.

== List of abbot ==
- Shi Jiren (释寂仁)
