= 1994 Karamay fire =

Theatre fire in Karamay, Xinjiang, China

Coordinates: 45°36′03″N 84°52′05″E

- Date: 8 December 1994
- Time: 16:10 Xinjiang Time; (18:10 (Beijing Time)
- Location: A theatre in Karamay
- Deaths: 325
- Injuries: 130

The Karamay fire (Chinese: 克拉玛依大火) of 8 December 1994 at the Friendship Theatre in Karamay, Xinjiang, China, was among the most notorious fires in China. Its notoriety derives partly from the disputed allegation that the schoolchildren, who were entertaining visiting officials, were ordered to remain seated when the fire started to allow the visiting officials to walk out first. The fire killed 325, including 288 schoolchildren.

== Building design ==
The Friendship Theatre was built in 1958 following Soviet architecture, renovated starting in 1989 and reentered operation in December 1991. The building had three floors and was originally designed with a capacity of 796 people. The renovation increased it to 810. The soundproofing material was made of asbestos and polyurethane; the curtains were made of cotton. In certain positions, the spotlight was only at a distance of 20 cm (7.9 in) from the stage curtains. Due to a lack of awareness on fire safety, the refurbishments of the theatre introduced many flammable objects, such as the seats, which due to being made from artificial fibres, burned well, spread out toxic gasses and proved fatal in the fire to many people.

A prior fire had occurred in the building, also as a result of burning a stage curtain with the spotlights; the curtain was electronically lowered, and the fire was able to be put out.

== Fire ==
On 8 December 1994, 500 schoolchildren were taken to a special variety performance at a theatre in Karamay at Friendship Theatre (友谊馆). Most were aged between seven and fourteen. At 18:10, a spotlight aimed too close at the curtains overheated the curtains, igniting the curtains towards the rear of the stage. By 18:20, a student in the second row noticed a burning smell; while the stage workers had realised the seriousness, much of the audience believed that it was part of the special effects and remained seated. Unlike the previous fire, the two electricians who operated the curtains were not available, being on a business trip to Ürümqi. Eventually, the main stage curtains were closed, concealing the fire from the audience; the fire was starved of oxygen, though it continued to burn, eventually burning through the electrical wiring and causing a blackout in the theatre. The students, who had previously remained seated started panicking to exit the theatre. At some point after the blackout, the supporting frame for the stage curtains collapsed, causing oxygen to rush into the previously starved fire, creating a backdraft reaching up to 1,200 °C (2,190 °F) at 60 60 atm (1,800 inHg).

First response consisted of four fire brigade trucks, however, the firefighters who arrived on scene first did not have proper respiratory equipment and thus struggled in the toxic environment, resulting in 27 injuries to firefighters due to the smoke. The fire crews also lacked powered equipment, with each fire truck having only one fire axe; the fire pump pressure around the hall was also lacking. The dry powder fire extinguishers in the theatre, though potent against chemical fires, were wholly useless against the fire, high up in the curtains.

=== "Let the officials leave first" ===
In 1995, the China Youth Daily was the first to have reported that somebody had asked the students "let the officials leave first" (让领导先走). The phrase has since become a catch phrase, meaning the government officials have priority over ordinary folks in times of emergency. As such, this fire remains the most notorious fire in China.

Online articles identified the official as Kuang Li (况丽), the vice-director of the state petroleum company's local education centre, without official confirmation of this. By the time the leaders had filed out of the only open emergency exit, the other exits remained locked, preventing many teachers and pupils from escaping.

Other survivors agreed that while "let the leaders go first" was indeed said, it was spoken at the beginning of the performance, as a manner of respect to them when the performance ends and China Youth Daily took the original sentence out of context. Notably, in the documentary Karamay, in an interview conducted in the hospital immediately after the fire, none of the interviewees spoke about the students being instructed to let the leaders go first.

The Guangxi Fire Department has argued that the evacuation issues were caused by panic, with people trying to escape through the doors from which they entered instead of the less crowded doors E and F. Additionally, the anti-robbery bars installed significantly hampered evacuation through windows and other doors.

== Fatalities and justice ==
A total of 325 deaths were reported, with 288 of them being school children. Out of 25 officials, 17 died at the scene.

甲、乙 are horizontally opening metal doors separating the entrance hall and the corridors. Only 甲 was open in the fire. Doors 1, 2, 3 are roller doors; 4, 5, 6, 7 and 8 are standard doors with an additional metal security door on the outside and locked in the fire. During the fire, door 3 was opened and fell down when power was cut. In another version, 3 was always open, 1 was closed but it was 2 that was out of order; in photos after the disaster, it is seen propped up by advertising hoarding. Although door 6 was locked, it was blown open by wind gusts from the fire. Doors A-F were wooden doors, C and D were locked. Red walls are windows; all windows had metal anti-theft bars. X marks where most people died.

In 1995, 300 families of the dead and injured sent representatives to the National People's Congress in Beijing, supposedly the venue for Chinese citizens to seek justice and a fair hearing. They were led off by security guards to a walled government compound, where five buses took them back to the airport. The group were then escorted through special channels to a plane bound for Xinjiang.

A court convicted a total of 13 people. Four of them, senior officials, were convicted of dereliction of duty and sentenced up to five years in prison. Others were convicted of lesser crimes while Zhao Zheng was acquitted.

Officials	Position	Prison time
Fang Tian Lu (方天录)	the highest-ranking official in the theatre	5 years
Zhao Lanxiu (赵兰秀)	the vice-mayor	4 years
Tang Jian (唐剑)	a city education official	5 years
Kuang Li (况丽)	-	4 years

Families received compensation of up to 50,589 yuan. One week after the fire, city officials in Karamay announced plans to demolish the burned out Friendship Theater. This plan was quickly scrapped following protests by residents of Karamay and parents of the deceased children. Three years later, in September 1997, the theater portion of the building was torn down, leaving only the front hall. This unmarked memorial still stands in what is now the People's Park in the center of Karamay.

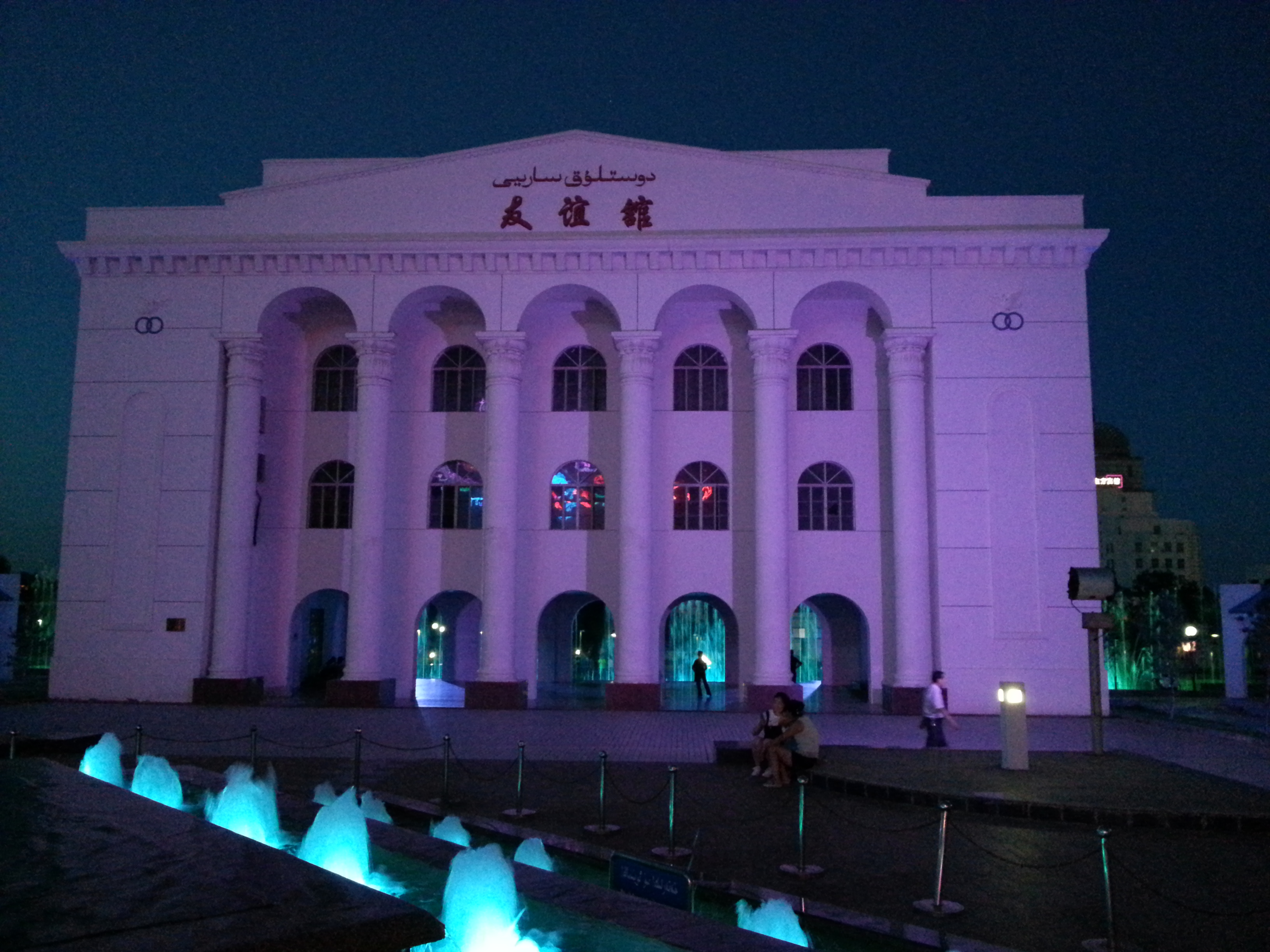
The Karamay Friendship Theater in 2016.

There is no plaque or memorial anywhere in Karamay that references the deadly fire.

== In popular culture ==
Popular Chinese folk singer Zhou Yunpeng (周云蓬) has compiled a list of Chinese man-made disasters and turned it into a song, and the Karamay fire incident was mentioned in the song, as was the internet catch phrase, "Let the officials walk out first." (让领导先走)

== See also ==
- Karamay (film)
- List of fires in China
