= Gulimina Mahamuti =

Chinese-American pianist

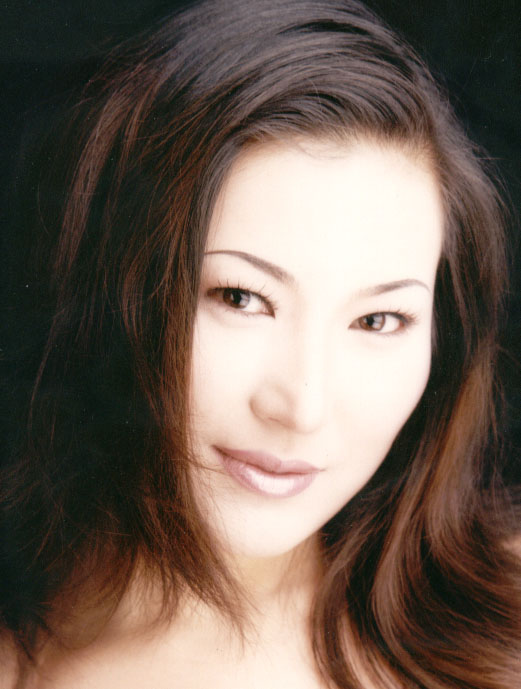
- Born: 9 May 1978 (age 48); Karamay, Xinjiang, China
- Occupations: Chinese-American pianist and performer. The first Chinese Uyghur to receive a Doctorate of Musical Arts in Piano Performance from the United States.
- Website: http://www.gulimina.com

Gulimina Mahamuti (Chinese: 古丽米娜·马哈木提; pinyin: Gǔlìmǐnà Mǎhāmùtí; born 9 May 1978) is a Chinese-American pianist.

== Biography ==
A native of Karamay City in Xinjiang, western China and the first Uyghur in China to receive a Doctorate of Musical Arts in Piano Performance from the United States, Gulimina Mahamuti performs in major cities throughout the U.S., Canada, Denmark, Hungary, Turkey, Mexico, and China, with broadcasts on radio and television. On January 8, 2012 at Carnegie Hall’s Weill Recital Hall, she performed Xinjiang solo piano music from western China by Shi Fu and Chen Yi, including premiere performances of Chen's Variations on "Awariguli," published by the Theodore Presser Company and the D String Song and Eagle Flute Dance from Xinjiang Suite No. 2 by Chinese composer Shi Fu.

Gulimina performed in Budapest at the invitation of the Turkish Ambassador in Hungary and in Istanbul under the auspices of the Turkish State Conservatory of Music, which was broadcast by Istanbul Technical University Radio. In the U.S., she gave recitals at various universities and music schools, including the opening concert for the "Year of the Nation Turkey" celebration at Queens College of The City University of New York. In 2008, she opened the UMKC festival, "A Schoenberg Retrospective," with Drei Klavierstücke, op. 11.

Gulimina is a member of the dynamic Duo Mundi George & Guli with George Lopez, the Robert Beckwith Artist in Residence at Bowdoin College. Her orchestral appearances include performances of Benjamin Britten's Piano Concerto, op. 13 with the Mansfield Symphony Orchestra on 14 April 2012, Saint-Saëns’ Le carnaval des animaux with the Southeast Kansas Symphony Orchestra (2010) and Chopin's Andante Spianato et Grand Polonaise, in E-flat major, op. 22 and the "Yellow River" Piano Concerto with the Harbin Symphony Orchestra in China (2005).

In the fall of 2011 Mahamuti joined the faculty of the Department of Music at Ohio Wesleyan University. She is a Nationally Certified Teacher of Music (NCTM) in piano in the U.S. and has previously taught at the conservatories of music of Capital University (U.S.) and of Northwest University for Nationalities in China. She performs extensively as a guest pianist in music schools across China, where she was interviewed frequently by China newspapers, radio, and television. In 2010, she performed and lectured in Beijing, Lanzhou, and Karamay, where she was featured in a two-part TV series on China State TV. Her life story, from her first piano lesson in Karamay to her earning a doctorate in the U.S., was the subject of a TV documentary in Gansu Province Public TV. Many of her students in China won Asian and domestic piano competitions and because of their achievements, she received the Excellent Piano Teacher Award on multiple occasions.

Mahamuti was published in major music journals in both China and the U.S. Her articles on piano education, pedagogy, and performance practices appeared in prestigious Chinese journals, including the People’s Music. After extensive nationwide research, she presented the results on how today's economy affected private music teaching at the Music Teachers National Association National Conference in Atlanta, Georgia. Her article, "Professional Development Makes You Recession-Resistant," was published in Clavier Companion; it was translated into Italian and appears in Didattica.

Her CD recording, Xinjiang Piano Music from Western China, features works by Chen Yi and Shi Fu. Her master's thesis in China on Shi Fu’s Xinjiang Piano Suites has become the main reference for Chinese and Western music scholars in their research and writing about his life and compositions. Her recent editorial work on Shi Fu's piano compositions was highly praised by the Shanghai Music Publisher in China.

She received the Doctorate of Musical Arts degree in Piano Performance from University of Missouri-Kansas City, where she was selected to attend The Harry S. Truman Good Neighbor Award Luncheon and where she became a twice-recipient of UMKC Women's Council Graduate Assistance Fund Fellowship and its Outstanding Merit Recipient. She received two Master of Music degrees, one in Piano Performance with Graduate Dean Academic Honors from Pittsburg State University and one in Piano Performance and Piano Pedagogy from Harbin Normal University in China. Mahamuti was elected to Phi Kappa Phi and Pi Kappa Lambda honor societies.

== CD recording ==
- "Xinjiang Piano Music from Western China." Gulimina Mahamuti, piano (2012).

== YouTube Channel ==
- “Gulimina Mahamuti YouTube Channel.”
- “Duo Mundi George & Guli YouTube Channel”

== Article ==
- "Professional Development Makes You Recession-Resistant" in Clavier Companion 1 (5) (September/October 2009): 48–50.
- "Sviluppo Della Professionalita' e Resistenza alla Recessione [Professional Development Makes You Recession-Resistant]," translated in Italian and appears in Didattica

== Bibliography ==
- Emre Aracı. "Carnegie Hall'da Mehtaplı Bir Gece [A Moonlit Night at the Carnegie Hall]," in Andante 68 (April 2012): 52–57.
