= China National Highway 217 =

Road in China

National Highway 217
- 217国道

Route information
- Length: 1,753 km (1,089 mi)

Major junctions
- From: Altay, Xinjiang
- To: Kuqa County, Xinjiang

Location
- Country: China

Highway system
- National Trunk Highway System; Primary; Auxiliary
← G216	→ G218

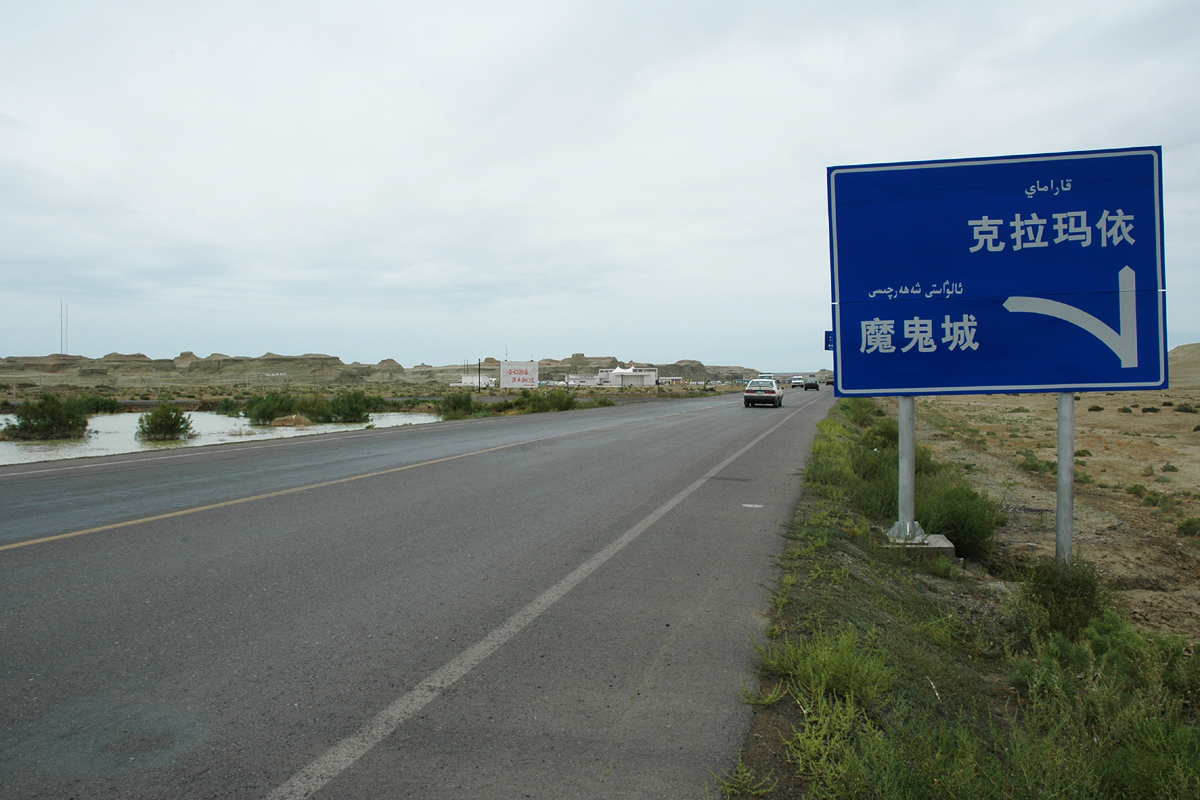
Turn-off for the "Ghost City" near Karamay

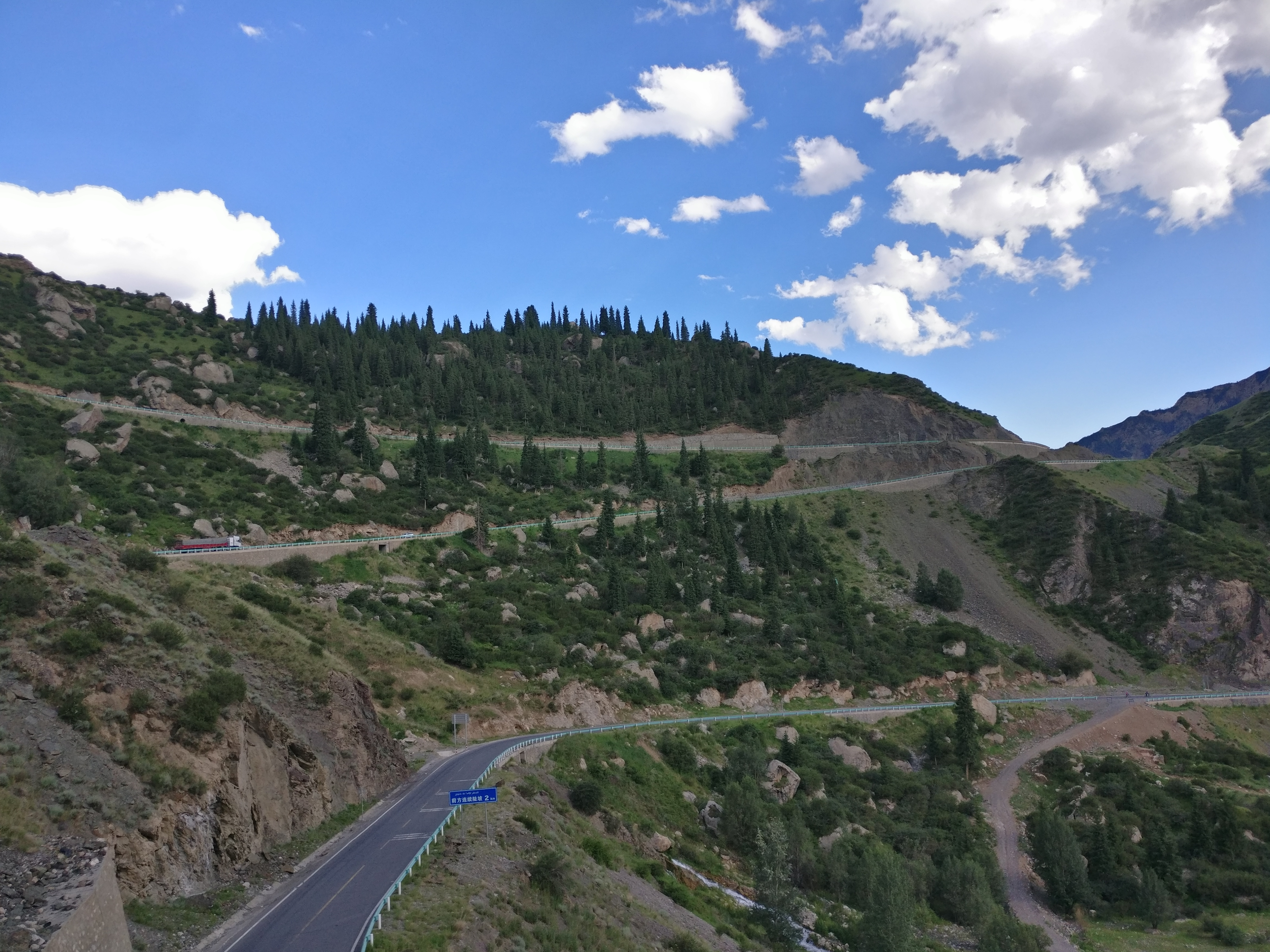
Curves at about 960 km from its starting point.

China National Highway 217 (G217) runs south from Altay, Xinjiang to Hotan, Xinjiang. It is 1,753 kilometres in length and runs southwest from Altay towards Kuqa County and from there southwards through the Taklamakan Desert to Hotan.

The highly scenic mountainous section between Dushanzi and Kuqa that crosses the Tianshan Mountains is commonly known as Duku Highway (独库公路). A section of Duku Highway also crosses the Bayanbulak Grassland National Nature Reserve.

== Route and distance ==
Route and distance

City	Distance (km)
Altay, Xinjiang	0
Burqin County, Xinjiang	110
Urho District, Xinjiang	339
Baijiantan District, Xinjiang	404
Karamay, Xinjiang	437
Kuytun, Xinjiang	574
Dushanzi District, Xinjiang	595
Kuqa County, Xinjiang	1117
Hotan, Xinjiang	1753

== Mountain Passes ==
From North to South:

- Haxilegen Pass, bypassed by tunnel. 3450 meters above the sea level.
- Yuximole Pass, bypassed by tunnel. 3438 meters above the sea level.
- Laerdun Pass. 2730 meters above the sea level.
- Tielimaiti Pass. bypassed by tunnel. 3335 meters above the sea level.

== See also ==
- China National Highways
