= Zhou Yunpeng =

Chinese singer-songwriter (born 1970)

Zhou Yunpeng (Chinese: 周云蓬; pinyin: Zhōu Yúnpéng; born 15 December 1970) is a Chinese blind independent folk singer, songwriter, and poet. Renowned for his poignant lyrics addressing social issues, personal struggles, and marginalized communities, he has released several studio albums and undertaken charitable projects benefiting visually impaired children.

== Early life and education ==
Zhou Yunpeng was born in Shenyang, Liaoning Province, in December 1970. He lost his sight at the age of nine due to an eye disease and subsequently attended a school for the visually impaired. Demonstrating academic aptitude, he enrolled in Changchun University's Chinese Language program and graduated in 1994.

Zhou finds his inspiration from reading, particularly classical Chinese literature; works such as Records of the Grand Historian, Comprehensive Mirror to Aid in Government, Dream of the Red Chamber, and Strange Tales from a Chinese Studio are books he has read over and over again. These texts enriched his mind with intellectual depth and breadth. Zhou embraces the Confucian idea that literature shall be a vehicle to convey the Way, and aspires to embody the qualities of the junzi — a gentleman who is steadfast, resolute, and mindful of his social responsibilities.

== Career ==
Zhou learned to play guitar at 15, attended university at 19, and started poem writing at 21. In 1995, shortly after completing his university studies, Zhou moved to Beijing and began performing folk songs as a street musician at the Old Summer Palace scenic area. Over the following years he traveled extensively across China, composing poetry and songwriting that explore themes of personal struggle, social injustice and the experiences of marginalized communities. Around 1998 he co-founded an independent poetry zine The Low Shore (低岸,Di’an) with some artist friends he met at the Old Summer Palace artist village. In 2002 published his first poetry collection, Spring's Rebuke (春天责备).

=== Recordings and publications ===
Zhou's debut album, Silent as a Mysterious Breath (沉默如谜的呼吸), was released in 2003 by Modern Sky Records (摩登天空). His second album, China's Children (中国孩子), was self-funded and issued in April 2007, featuring songs that juxtapose his life experience as a blind artist with broader social observations; it was limited to 3,000 copies and featured cover art by his partner, Yu Xiaoya.

Subsequent releases include Stir-Fried Bitter Melon (清炒苦瓜, 2008), The Cow and the Goat Descend the Mountain (牛羊下山, 2010) and April in Old County (四月旧州, 2014).

==== China's Children ====
The album's title track "China's Children" alludes to several incidents involving the death of young children and students across the country, the most well known one being the Karamay fire in 1994. The lyrics read: "Don't be the children of the Chinese, their fathers and mothers are coward. To prove their cold-heartedness, while Death was drawing near, they arranged the officials to evacuate first." The song was recorded in the basement of Xiaohe (小河), a folk singer-songwriter and music producer. In addition to the guitar solo by Zhou Yunpeng, Xiaohe added a double bass track and a humming chorus performed by pre-school kids. In 2007, Zhou started a solo performing tour across the country, with 40 shows at stops including Kunming, Guiyang, Changsha, Wuhan, Chongqing, Chengdu, Shanghai, and many other cities. 2000 copies of China's Children were sold at the concerts.

At a 2017 interview, Zhou said that he had not been performing "China's Children" in mainland China for a while, as the song did not pass official screening. The song's critical voice led some to label Zhou as a "protest singer" or "dissident singer", a characterization he rejected. He explained that only a couple of his songs contain dissident elements, while the majority are restrained and composed. At most, he said, his songs are melancholy, reflecting his own life experiences. Zhou also held that folk singers are not social critics, and the essence of folksong is to portray ordinary life with compassion and honesty.

==== The Cow and the Goat Descend the Mountain ====
This work sets to melody verses from the Chinese poetic tradition, including those of Du Fu, Li Bai, and Meng Jiao. Its themes of homesickness and longing reflect a recurrent sentiment in classical literature, while also resonating with the realities of modern migration and displacement. For Zhou, who lost his sight in childhood, the album recalls the poems he once memorized at school, carried with him as enduring companions through years of travel and hardship. Among the Tang poets, Zhou has a deep admiration for Du Fu, particularly for his moral integrity, social critique, and poetic depth. Zhou composed "Three Verses of Du Fu" as a musical tribute, stating that Du Fu's values and style resonate with his own artistic outlook. Zhou's revival of ancient poetry is less an escape from modern hardships than an act of artistic continuity and quiet resistance.

==== Philanthropy ====
In 2009, Zhou initiated the "Red Bulldozer" (红色推土机) project to support impoverished blind children. He invited more than twenty mainland folk singers to record an eponymous charity album of nursery rhymes and children's songs. The album was released on 10 April 2009, with proceeds directed toward educational and welfare programs for visually impaired youth.

== Awards and recognition ==
- Nominated for Best Folk Artist at the 5th Chinese Music Media Awards (2005).
- Best Folk Artist and Best Lyricist at the 8th Chinese Music Media Awards, for his Album China's Children (2007)
- People's Literature Award - Poetry, for poetry collection Love That Cannot Speak (2011)

== Discography ==
Studio albums

- Silent as a Mysterious Breath (沉默如谜的呼吸), 2004
- China's Children (中国孩子), 2007
- Stir-Fried Bitter Melon (清炒苦瓜), 2008
- The Cow and the Goat Descend the Mountain (牛羊下山), 2010
- April in Old County (四月旧州), 2014

Compilations and collaborations

- Red Bulldozer (红色推土机), 2009 (charity compilation)
- Golden Bulldozer (金色推土机), 2012
- Voice of Freedom: Contemporary Folk Compilation (自由之声–当代民谣合辑)
