= Dushanzi, Karamay =

Dushanzi: 独山子区 (Chinese); مايتاغ رايونى (Uyghur); Maytag
- District
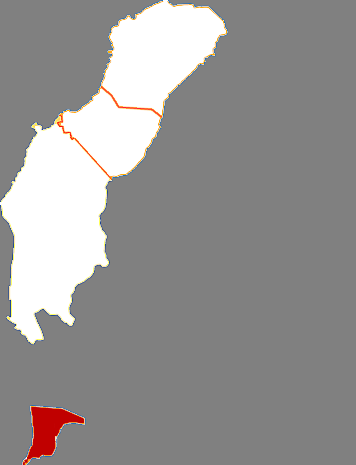
- Dushanzi in Karamay

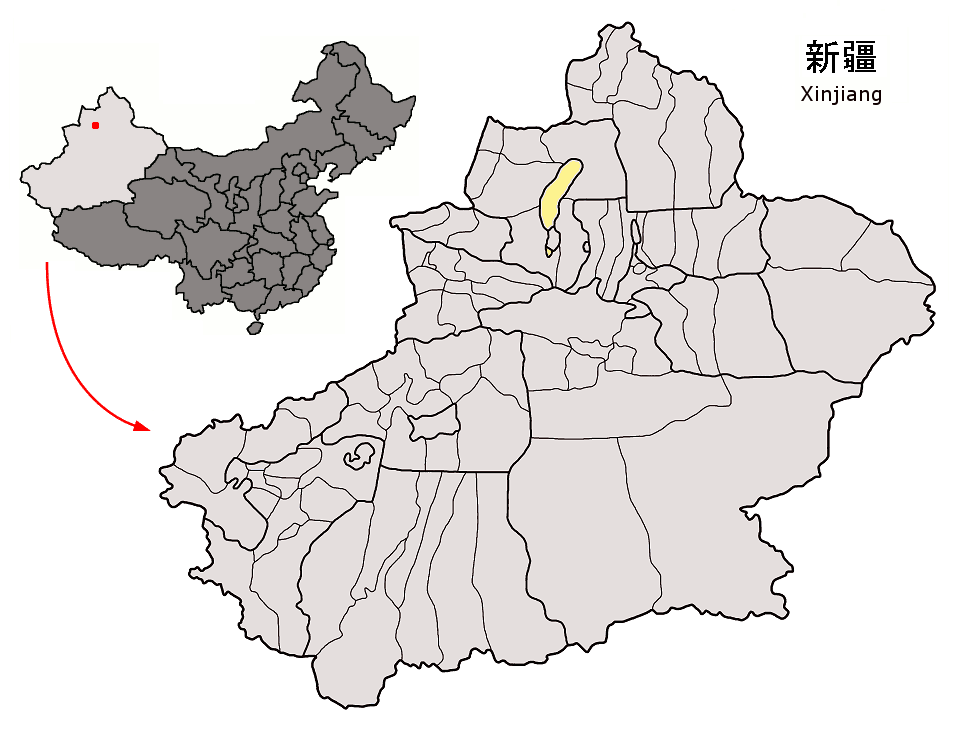
- Karamay in Xinjiang

- Location of the seat in Xinjiang Dushanzi (Xinjiang) Dushanzi (China)
- Coordinates: 45°36′N 84°52′E
- Country: China
- Region: Xinjiang
- Prefecture-level city: Karamay
- District seat: Xining Road Subdistrict

Area
  - Total: 404.1 km^{2} (156.0 sq mi)

Population (2020)
  - Total: 84,395
  - Density: 208.8/km^{2} (540.9/sq mi)
- Time zone: UTC+8 (China Standard (Note: Locals in Xinjiang frequently observe UTC+6 (Xinjiang Time), 2 hours behind Beijing.))
- Website: www.dsz.gov.cn

Dushanzi

Chinese name
- Simplified Chinese: 独山子区
- Traditional Chinese: 獨山子區
- Hanyu Pinyin: Dúshānzǐ Qū
Transcriptions
Standard Mandarin
- Hanyu Pinyin: Dúshānzǐ Qū

Alternative Chinese name
- Simplified Chinese: 玛依塔克
- Hanyu Pinyin: Mǎyītǎkè
Transcriptions
Standard Mandarin
- Hanyu Pinyin: Mǎyītǎkè

Second alternative Chinese name
- Simplified Chinese: 玛依套
- Hanyu Pinyin: Mǎyītào
Transcriptions
Standard Mandarin
- Hanyu Pinyin: Mǎyītào

Uyghur name
- Uyghur: مايتاغ رايونى
Transcriptions
- Latin Yëziqi: Maytagh Rayoni
- Yengi Yeziⱪ: Maytaƣ Rayoni
- SASM/GNC: Maytag Rayoni
- Siril Yëziqi: Майтағ Райони

Dushanzi District (Tu Shan Tzu) or Maytag District, is a district of the city of Karamay, in the Xinjiang Uyghur Autonomous Region, China and is under the administrative jurisdiction of the Karamay City. It contains an area of 400 km^{2} (150 sq mi). According to the 2002 census, it has a population of 60,000.

== Administrative divisions ==
Dushanzi District contains 3 subdistricts:

Name	Simplified Chinese	Hanyu Pinyin	Uyghur (UEY)	Uyghur Latin (ULY)	Administrative division code
Subdistricts
Jinshan Road Subdistrict	金山路街道	Jīnshānlù Jiēdào	ئالتۇنتاغ يولى كوچا باشقارمىسى	Altuntagh yoli kocha bashqarmisi	650202001
Xining Road Subdistrict	西宁路街道	Xīnínglù Jiēdào	شىنىڭ يولى كوچا باشقارمىسى	Shining yoli kocha bashqarmisi	650202002
Xinbeiqu Subdistrict	新北区街道	Xīnběiqū Jiēdào	يېڭى شىمالىي رايون كوچا باشقارمىسى	Yëngi shimaliy rayon kocha bashqarmisi	650202003

== Transport ==
- China National Highway 217
