= Karamay (film) =

2010 Chinese documentary film by Xu Xin

- Chinese release poster
- 克拉玛依
- Directed by: Xu Xin
- Release date: 28 March 2010
- Running time: 356 minutes
- Country: China
- Language: Mandarin

Karamay (simplified Chinese: 克拉玛依; traditional Chinese: 克拉瑪依; pinyin: Kèlāmǎyī) is a 2010 documentary film by Chinese director Xu Xin about the 1994 Karamay fire. It is largely black-and-white.

== See also ==
- List of longest films
