= Baijiantan, Karamay =

Baijiantan: 白碱滩区 (Chinese); جەرەنبۇلاق رايونى (Uyghur)
- District
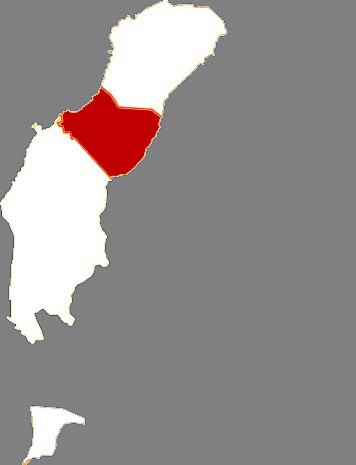
- Baijiantan in Karamay

- Location of the seat in Xinjiang Baijiantan (Xinjiang) Baijiantan (China)
- Coordinates: 45°38′N 85°11′E
- Country: China
- Autonomous region: Xinjiang
- Prefecture-level city: Karamay
- District seat: Zhongxing Road Subdistrict

Area
  - Total: 1,268 km^{2} (490 sq mi)

Population (2020)
  - Total: 50,825
  - Density: 40.08/km^{2} (103.8/sq mi)
- Time zone: UTC+8 (China Standard (Note: Locals in Xinjiang frequently observe UTC+6 (Xinjiang Time), 2 hours behind Beijing.))
- Website: www.bjtq.gov.cn

Baijiantan, Karamay

Chinese name
- Simplified Chinese: 白碱滩区
- Traditional Chinese: 白鹼灘區
Transcriptions
Standard Mandarin
- Hanyu Pinyin: Báijiǎntān Qū
Yue: Cantonese
- Jyutping: baak^{6}gaan^{2}taan^{1} keoi^{1}

Uyghur name
- Uyghur: جەرەنبۇلاق رايونى
Transcriptions
- Latin Yëziqi: Jerenbulaq Rayoni
- Yengi Yeziⱪ: Jərənbulaⱪ Rayoni
- Siril Yëziqi: Җәрәнбулақ Райони

Baijiantan District (Chinese: 白碱滩区; Uyghur: جەرەنبۇلاق رايونى) is a district of the city of Karamay in the Xinjiang Uyghur Autonomous Region. It contains an area of 1,272 km^{2} (491 sq mi). According to the 2002 census, it has a population of 60,000.

== Administrative divisions ==
Baijiantan District contains 3 subdistricts:

Name	Simplified Chinese	Hanyu Pinyin	Uyghur (UEY)	Uyghur Latin (ULY)	Administrative division code
Subdistricts
Zhongxing Road Subdistrict	中兴路街道	Zhōngxīnglù Jiēdào	مەركىزىي ئاۋات يولى كوچا باشقارمىسى	Merkiziy Awat yoli kocha bashqarmisi	650204001
Sanping Road Subdistrict	三平路街道	Sānpínglù Jiēdào	سەنپىڭ يولى كوچا باشقارمىسى	Senping yoli kocha bashqarmisi	650204002
Jinlongzhen Subdistrict	金龙镇街道	Jīnlóngzhèn Jiēdào	جىنلۇڭ بازىرى كوچا باشقارمىسى	Jinlung baziri kocha bashqarmisi	650204003

== Transport ==
- China National Highway 217
