= Karamay =

Prefecture-level city in Xinjiang, China

Karamay: 克拉玛依市 (Chinese); قاراماي شەھىرى (Uyghur); Karamai
- Prefecture-level city
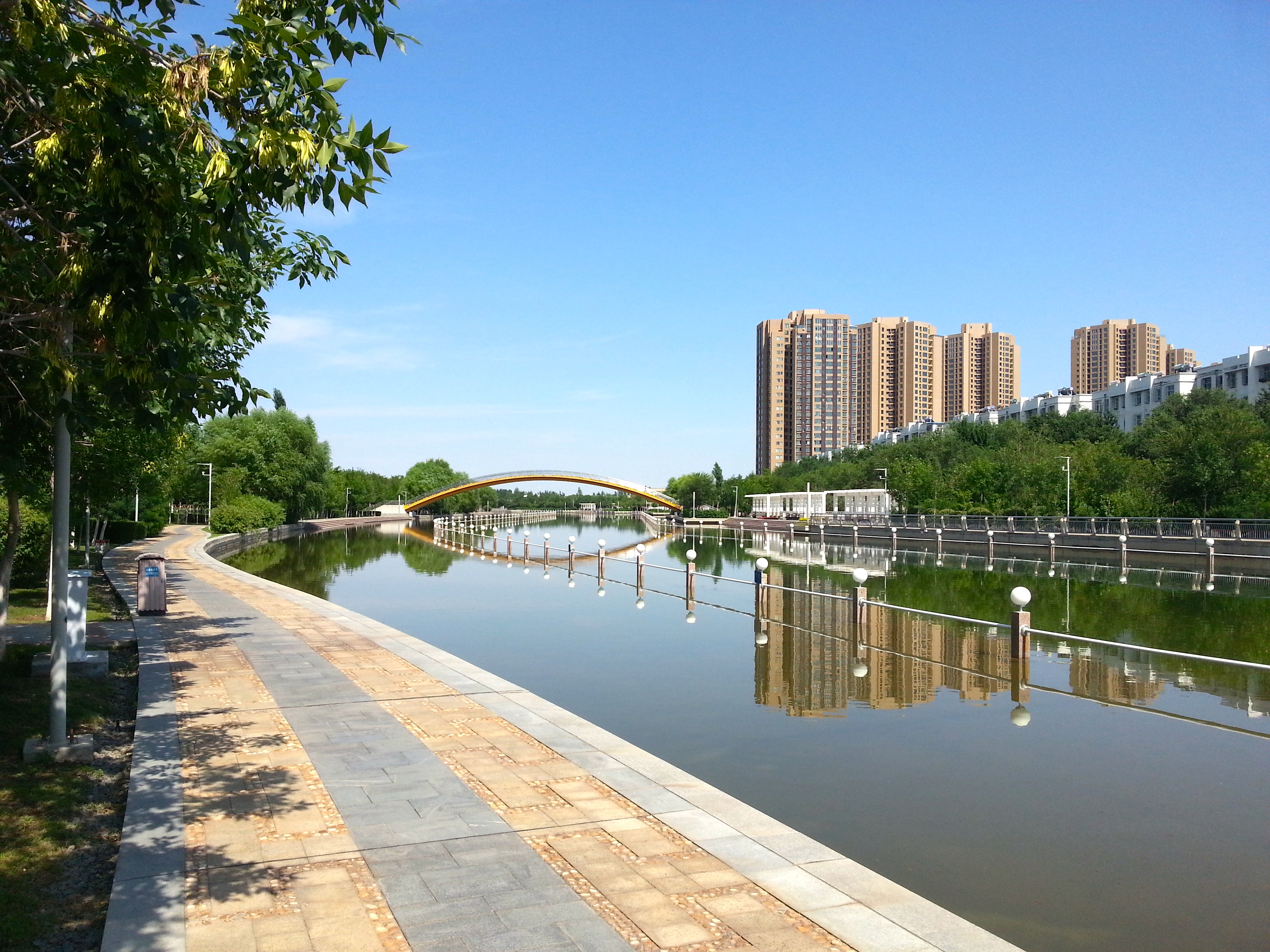
- The Karamay River running through Karamay District
- Etymology: From Uyghur words qara may (قارا ماي), meaning "black oil"
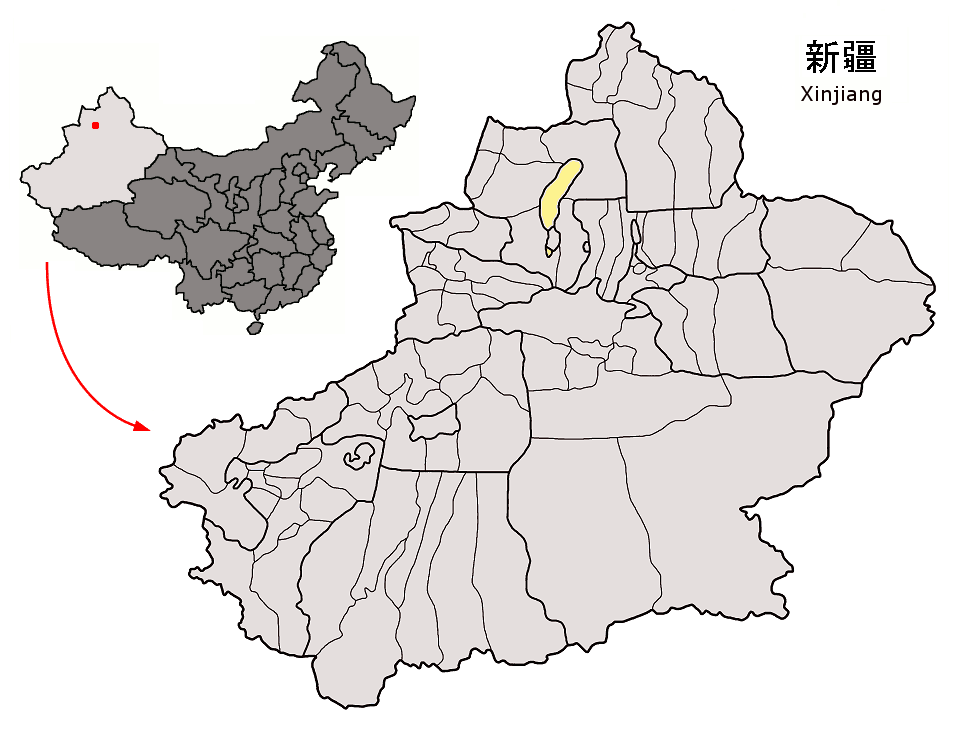
- Location of Karamay City jurisdiction in Xinjiang

- Location of the city centre in Xinjiang Karamay (Xinjiang) Karamay (China)
- Coordinates (Karamay municipal government): 45°34′48″N 84°53′21″E
- Country: People's Republic of China
- Region: Xinjiang
- Municipal seat: Karamay District
- Subdivisions: Districts: Karamay; Baijiantan; Dushanzi; Uroho

Area
  - Total: 7,734 km^{2} (2,986 sq mi)
- Elevation: 354 m (1,161 ft)

Population (2020)
  - Total: 490,348
  - Density: 63.40/km^{2} (164.2/sq mi)
  - Major Nationalities: Han Chinese – 74.8%

GDP
  - Total: CN¥ 97.3 billion US$ 14.1 billion
  - Per capita: CN¥ 210,426; US$ 30,452
- Time zone: UTC+8 (China Standard)
- Postal code: 834000
- Area code: 0990
- ISO 3166 code: CN-XJ-02
- License Plate Prefix: 新J
- Website: www.klmy.gov.cn/Pages/default.aspx

Karamay

Chinese name
- Simplified Chinese: 克拉玛依
- Traditional Chinese: 克拉瑪依
Transcriptions
Standard Mandarin
- Hanyu Pinyin: Kèlāmǎyī
- Wade–Giles: Kʻo⁴-la¹-ma³-i¹
other Mandarin
- Xiao'erjing: کْ‌لَامَاءِ
- Dungan: Кәламайы

Uyghur name
- Uyghur: قاراماي
- Literal meaning: black oil
Transcriptions
- Latin Yëziqi: Qaramay
- Yengi Yeziⱪ: Ⱪaramay
- SASM/GNC: K̂aramay
- Siril Yëziqi: Қарамай

Karamay (also spelled Karamai; Chinese: 克拉玛依, romanized: Kèlāmǎyī, Uyghur: قاراماي, romanized: Qaramay) is a prefecture-level city in the north of the Xinjiang Uyghur Autonomous Region, People's Republic of China. It is surrounded on all sides by Tacheng Prefecture. The name of the city comes from the Uyghur language and means "black oil", referring to the oil fields near the city.

Karamay was the site of one of the worst disasters in modern Chinese history, the 1994 Karamay fire, when 324 people, including 288 school children, lost their lives in a cinema fire on 8 December 1994.

== Subdivisions ==
Karamay City has jurisdiction over four districts (区; qū). They are not contiguous as Dushanzi District is located south of the Lanxin Railway and forms an exclave, separated from the rest of Karamay City by Kuytun City. Together with Kuytun City, Karamay City forms an enclave surrounded on all sides by Tacheng Prefecture.

Map
District	Hanzi	Hanyu Pinyin	Uyghur (UEY)	Uyghur Latin (ULY)	Population (2020 Census)	Area (km^{2})	Density (/km^{2})
Karamay	克拉玛依区	Kèlāmǎyī Qū	قاراماي رايونى	Qaramay Rayoni	337,188	3,834	87.95
Dushanzi	独山子区	Dúshānzǐ Qū	مايتاغ رايونى	Maytagh Rayoni	84,395	400	210.99
Baijiantan	白碱滩区	Báijiǎntān Qū	جەرەنبۇلاق رايونى	Jerenbulaq Rayoni	50,825	1,272	39.96
Orku	乌尔禾区	Wū'ěrhé Qū	ئورقۇ رايونى	Orqu Rayoni	17,940	2,228	8.05

== Geography ==
Karamay is located in the northwest of the Dzungarian basin, with an average elevation of 400 meters (1,300 ft). Its administrative area ranges in latitude from 44° 07' to 46° 08' N and in longitude from 80° 44' to 86° 01' E and has a maximal 240 km (150 mi) north–south extent and reaches 110 km (68 mi) in east–west width. It borders Hoboksar Mongol Autonomous County to the northeast, Shawan County to the southeast, Toli County and Wusu to the west and Kuytun to the south.

The naturally available water supply in the Karamay area is limited: it mostly consists of two small rivers (the Baiyang River and the Da'erbute River (达尔不特河) flowing into the Dzungarian Basin from the mountains of its northwestern rim. In addition, the city receives water from the Irtysh River, over the Irtysh–Karamay Canal, which was officially opened in 2008.

A number of natural (Ailik Lake) and artificial (Fengcheng, Huangyangquan) reservoirs are located in Karamay's northeastern Urho District; they all are replenished, directly or indirectly, by water from the Irtysh–Karamay Canal.

=== Climate ===
Karamay has an extremely continental desert climate (Köppen climate classification BWk, Trewartha BWac), typified by great seasonal extremes in temperature, varying by 43.0 °C (77.4 °F); with very hot summers (for its latitude) and severely cold winters with brief spring and autumn in between. The monthly 24-hour average temperature is −15.2 °C (4.6 °F) in January and soars to 27.8 °C (82.0 °F) in July and the annual mean is 8.91 °C (48.0 °F), warmer than most places at the corresponding latitude, due to the long summers. Annual precipitation is 119 millimeters (4.69 in) and the summer months record the most rainfall, despite relative humidity levels averaging around 30%. With monthly percent possible sunshine ranging from 37% in December to 71% in September, sunshine is generous, only occurring less than 50% of the time in November and December and the annual average total is 2,694 hours.

Climate data for Karamay, elevation 450 m (1,480 ft), (1991–2020 normals, extremes 1951–2010)
Month	Jan	Feb	Mar	Apr	May	Jun	Jul	Aug	Sep	Oct	Nov	Dec	Year
Record high °C (°F)	5.8 (42.4)	12.9 (55.2)	24.9 (76.8)	35.6 (96.1)	39.5 (103.1)	40.7 (105.3)	44.0 (111.2)	42.7 (108.9)	39.1 (102.4)	29.9 (85.8)	20.2 (68.4)	9.5 (49.1)	44.0 (111.2)
Mean daily maximum °C (°F)	−11.9 (10.6)	−6.6 (20.1)	6.4 (43.5)	19.7 (67.5)	26.4 (79.5)	31.7 (89.1)	33.4 (92.1)	31.8 (89.2)	25.0 (77.0)	15.3 (59.5)	3.5 (38.3)	−8.0 (17.6)	13.9 (57.0)
Daily mean °C (°F)	−15.9 (3.4)	−10.8 (12.6)	1.7 (35.1)	14.0 (57.2)	20.5 (68.9)	26.0 (78.8)	27.7 (81.9)	26.0 (78.8)	19.5 (67.1)	10.5 (50.9)	−0.2 (31.6)	−11.4 (11.5)	9.0 (48.2)
Mean daily minimum °C (°F)	−18.9 (−2.0)	−14.3 (6.3)	−2.4 (27.7)	9.2 (48.6)	15.2 (59.4)	20.7 (69.3)	22.5 (72.5)	20.8 (69.4)	14.7 (58.5)	6.5 (43.7)	−3.2 (26.2)	−14.0 (6.8)	4.7 (40.5)
Record low °C (°F)	−35.9 (−32.6)	−34.3 (−29.7)	−26.7 (−16.1)	−10.4 (13.3)	2.1 (35.8)	9.0 (48.2)	12.3 (54.1)	8.2 (46.8)	0.3 (32.5)	−7.7 (18.1)	−27.2 (−17.0)	−34.3 (−29.7)	−35.9 (−32.6)
Average precipitation mm (inches)	4.6 (0.18)	3.3 (0.13)	3.4 (0.13)	9.5 (0.37)	14.0 (0.55)	17.8 (0.70)	27.2 (1.07)	17.4 (0.69)	9.2 (0.36)	7.3 (0.29)	5.6 (0.22)	6.1 (0.24)	125.4 (4.93)
Average precipitation days (≥ 0.1 mm)	7.5	5.6	2.9	4.5	5.3	7.5	9.5	7.1	4.6	3.6	4.2	8.5	70.8
Average snowy days	12.7	10.2	3.8	0.6	0	0	0	0	0	0.5	5.4	13.7	46.9
Average relative humidity (%)	78	75	56	35	31	32	35	34	35	46	63	77	50
Mean monthly sunshine hours	127.2	150.7	218.9	259.9	306.7	299.3	301.2	301.6	264.2	222.3	135.9	97.9	2,685.8
Percentage possible sunshine	44	50	58	63	66	64	64	71	72	67	49	36	59
Source: China Meteorological Administration

== Demographics ==
According to the 2010 census, over 80% of Karamay's population are Han Chinese, with minorities such as Uighur, Kazakhs, Mongols and Hui making up the rest. The population of 2010 is 391,008, a rise from the 270,232 of 2000 census. The population density is 50.6 inhabitants per km^{2}. The 2015 population estimate is 401,468.

Population by ethnicity (2010)

Ethnicity	Population	%
Han Chinese	319,265	81.65%
Uyghur	44,866	11.47%
Kazakhs	11,620	2.97%
Hui	8,238	2.11%
Mongol	2,348	0.60%
Manchu	754	0.19%
Xibe	681	0.17%
Tujia	678	0.17%
Russian	471	0.12%
Uzbek	177	0.05%
Dongxiang	133	0.03%
Kyrgyz	117	0.03%
Tajik	35	<0.01%
Others	1,625	0.42%
Total	391,008	100%

== Economy ==
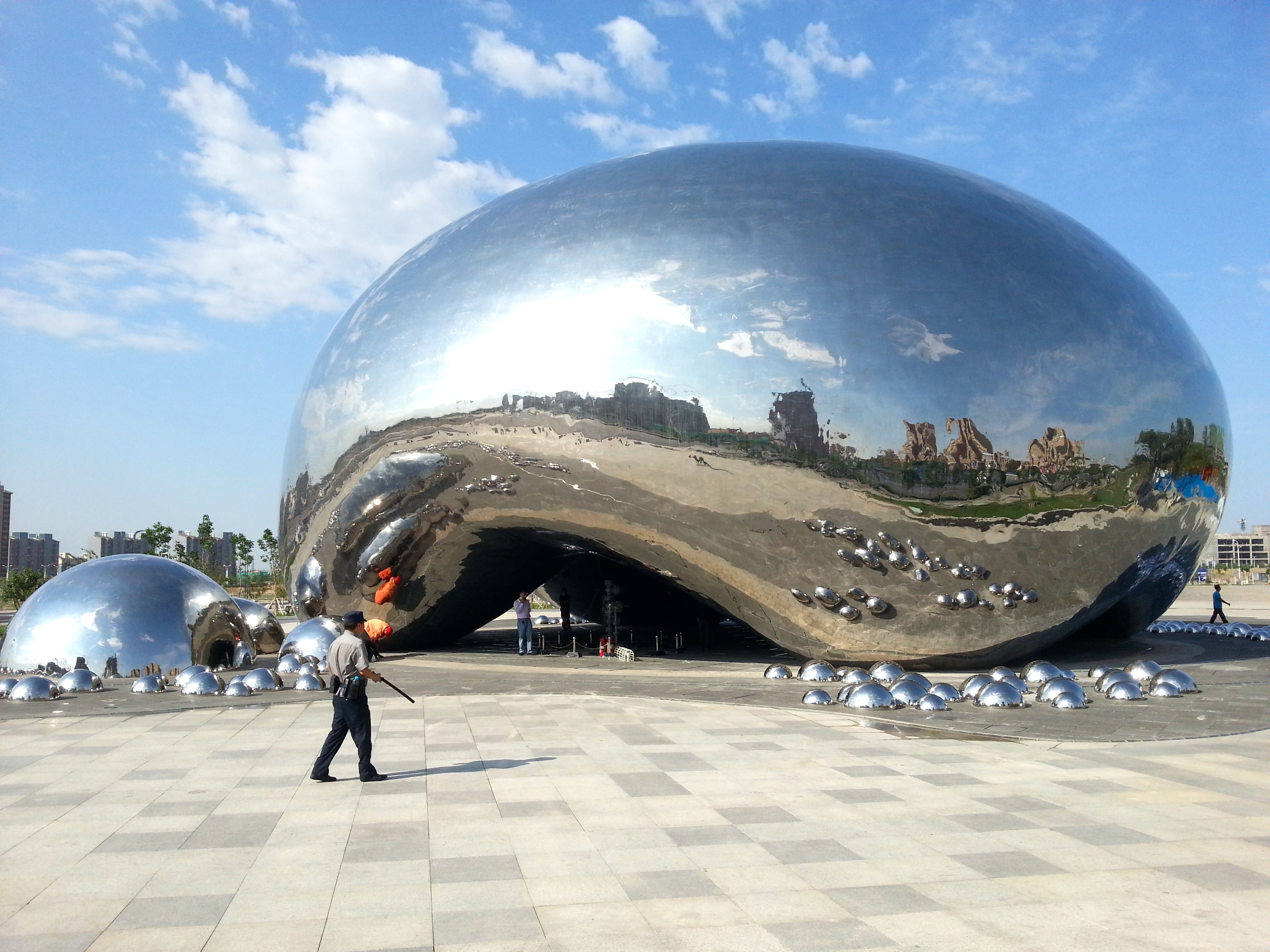
The Karamay Large Oil Bubble art piece. It was constructed between 2013 and 2015. It has been accused of being a copy of Anish Kapoor's Cloud Gate sculpture in Chicago, Illinois.

In 1955, one of the largest oil fields in China was discovered there. Since then, the city has grown into an oil-producing and refining center.

In 2008, the GDP reached ¥66.1 billion and GDP per capita reached ¥242,391 (US$34,901), ranking first among 659 cities in mainland China.

=== Cloud computing industry ===
Karamay has established a Cloud Computing Industry Park as part of its economic diversification strategy away from traditional oil extraction. The park leverages the city's abundant power supply and cool, dry climate to host data centers and attract IT companies, positioning itself as a key node for data services in Western China.

== Transport ==
- Kuytun–Beitun Railway. There are passenger stations in Karamay itself and in Wuwu New Town (五五新镇街道), south of central Karamay.
- Karamay–Tacheng Railway
- Kelamayi Guhai Airport
- China National Highway 217

== Notable persons ==
- Adil Mijit, comedian
- Gulimina Mahamuti, pianist
