= Shuimogou, Ürümqi =

Shuimogou: 水磨沟区 (Chinese); بۇلاقتاغ رايونى (Uyghur)
- District
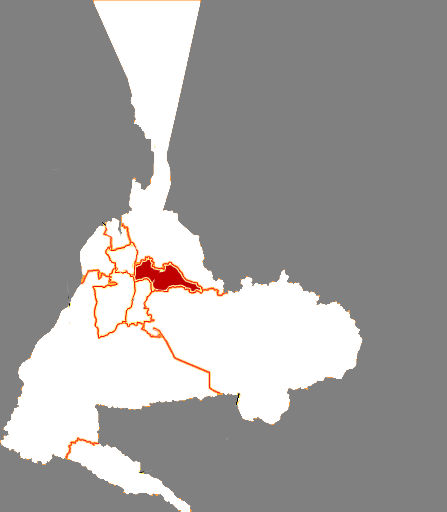
- Location in Ürümqi

- Location of the seat in Xinjiang Shuimogou (Xinjiang) Shuimogou (China)
- Coordinates: 43°48′N 87°35′E
- Country: China
- Autonomous region: Xinjiang
- Prefecture-level city: Ürümqi
- District seat: Shuitashan Subdistrict

Area
  - Total: 280.1 km^{2} (108.1 sq mi)

Population (2020)
  - Total: 549,576
  - Density: 1,962/km^{2} (5,082/sq mi)
- Time zone: UTC+8 (China Standard (Note: Locals in Xinjiang frequently observe UTC+6 (Xinjiang Time), 2 hours behind Beijing.))
- Website: www.xjsmgq.gov.cn

Shuimogou, Ürümqi

Chinese name
- Simplified Chinese: 水磨沟区
- Traditional Chinese: 水磨溝區
Transcriptions
Standard Mandarin
- Hanyu Pinyin: Shuǐmógōu Qū

Uyghur name
- Uyghur: بۇلاقتاغ رايونى
Transcriptions
- Latin Yëziqi: Bulaqtagh Rayoni

Shuimogou District or Bulaqtagh District (Chinese: 水磨沟区; pinyin: Shuǐmógōu Qū; Uyghur: بۇلاقتاغ رايونى, romanized: Bulaqtagh Rayoni) is one of 7 urban districts of the prefecture-level city of Ürümqi, the capital of Xinjiang Uygur Autonomous Region, Northwest China. It contains an area of 91 km^{2} (35 sq mi). According to the 2002 census, it has a population of 150,000.

== Administrative divisions ==
Shuimogou District contains 14 subdistricts:

Name	Simplified Chinese	Hanyu Pinyin	Uyghur (UEY)	Uyghur Latin (ULY)	Administrative division code
Subdistricts
Shuimogou Subdistrict	水磨沟街道	Shuǐmògōu Jiēdào	بۇلاقتاغ كوچا باشقارمىسى	Bulaqtagh kocha bashqarmisi	650105001
Liudaowan Subdistrict	六道湾街道	Liùdàowān Jiēdào	ليۇداۋان كوچا باشقارمىسى	Lyudawan kocha bashqarmisi	650105002
Weihuliang Subdistrict	苇湖梁街道	Wěihúliáng Jiēdào	ۋېيخۇلياڭ كوچا باشقارمىسى	Wëyxulyang kocha bashqarmisi	650105003
Xinmin Road Subdistrict	新民路街道	Xīnmínlù Jiēdào	يېڭى دېموكراتىيە يولى كوچا باشقارمىسى	Yëngi dëmokratiye yoli kocha bashqarmisi	650105005
Nanhu South Road Subdistrict	南湖南路街道	Nánhúnánlù Jiēdào	يېكەنكۆل جەنۇبىي يولى كوچا باشقارمىسى	Yëkenköl jenubiy yoli kocha bashqarmisi	650105006
Nanhu North Road Subdistrict	南湖北路街道	Nánhúběilù Jiēdào	شىمالىي يېكەنكۆل يولى كوچا باشقارمىسى	Shimaliy yëkenköl yoli kocha bashqarmisi	650105007
Qidaowan Subdistrict	七道湾街道	Qīdàowān Jiēdào	چىداۋان كوچا باشقارمىسى	Chidawan kocha bashqarmisi	650105008
Yushugou Subdistrict	榆树沟街道	Yúshùgōu Jiēdào	يۈشۇگۇ كوچا باشقارمىسى	Yüshugu kocha bashqarmisi	650105010
Shirenzigou Subdistrict	石人子沟街道	Shírénzǐgōu Jiēdào	شىرېنزىگۇ كوچا باشقارمىسى	Shirënzigu kocha bashqarmisi	650105011
Shuitashan Subdistrict	水塔山街道	Shuǐtǎshān Jiēdào	سۇمۇنار تېغى كوچا باشقارمىسى	Sumunar tëghi kocha bashqarmisi	650105012
Huaguang Street Subdistrict	华光街街道	Huáguāngjiē Jiēdào	خۇاگۇاڭ كوچىسى كوچا باشقارمىسى	Xuaguang kochisi kocha bashqarmisi	650105013
Longsheng Street Subdistrict	龙盛街街道	Lóngshèngjiē Jiēdào	لۇڭشېڭ كوچىسى كوچا باشقارمىسى	Lungshëng kochisi kocha bashqarmisi	650105014
Zhen'an Street Subdistrict	振安街街道	Zhèn'ānjiē Jiēdào	جېنئەن كوچىسى كوچا باشقارمىسى	Jën'en kochisi kocha bashqarmisi	650105015
Hemaquan Subdistrict	河马泉街道	Hémǎquán Jiēdào	خېماچۈەن كوچا باشقارمىسى	Xëmachüen kocha bashqarmisi	650105016

== Tourist attractions ==
Qingquan Temple is a Buddhist temple in the district.
