= Karamay, Karamay =

Karamay: 克拉玛依区 (Chinese); قاراماي رايونى (Uyghur)
- District
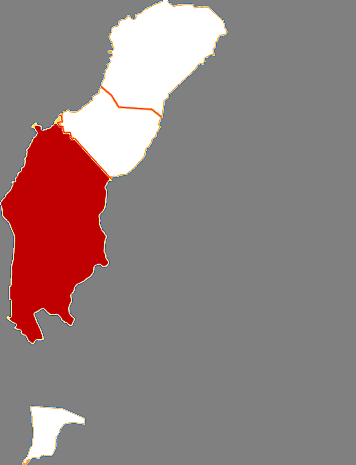
- Karamay District in Karamay

- Location of the seat in Xinjiang Karamay (Xinjiang) Karamay (China)
- Coordinates: 45°36′N 84°52′E
- Country: China
- Autonomous region: Xinjiang
- Prefecture-level city: Karamay
- District seat: Tianshan Road Subdistrict

Area
  - Total: 3,253 km^{2} (1,256 sq mi)

Population (2020)
  - Total: 337,188
  - Density: 103.7/km^{2} (268.5/sq mi)
- Time zone: UTC+8 (China Standard (Note: Locals in Xinjiang frequently observe UTC+6 (Xinjiang Time), 2 hours behind Beijing.))
- Website: www.klmyq.gov.cn

Karamay, Karamay

Chinese name
- Simplified Chinese: 克拉玛依区
- Traditional Chinese: 克拉瑪依區
Transcriptions
Standard Mandarin
- Hanyu Pinyin: Kèlāmǎyī Qū

Uyghur name
- Uyghur: قاراماي رايونى
Transcriptions
- Latin Yëziqi: Qaramay Rayoni
- Yengi Yeziⱪ: Ⱪaramay Rayoni
- Siril Yëziqi: Қарамай Райони

Karamay District (Uyghur: قاراماي رايونى, romanized: Qaramay Rayoni, Ⱪaramay Rayoni, Қарамай Райони) is a district of Karamay City, Xinjiang, China. It contains an area of 5,351 km^{2}. According to the 2002 census, it had a population of 150,000.

== Administrative divisions ==
Karamay District contains 7 subdistricts, 1 township:

Name	Simplified Chinese	Hanyu Pinyin	Uyghur (UEY)	Uyghur Latin (ULY)	Administrative division code
Subdistricts
Tianshan Road Subdistrict	天山路街道	Tiānshānlù Jiēdào	تەڭرىتاغ يولى كوچا باشقارمىسى	Tengritagh yoli kocha bashqarmisi	650203001
Shengli Road Subdistrict	胜利路街道	Shènglìlù Jiēdào	غەلىبىيەت يولى كوچا باشقارمىسى	Ghelibiyet yoli kocha bashqarmisi	650203002
Kunlun Road Subdistrict	昆仑路街道	Kūnlúnlù Jiēdào	كۇئېنلۇن يولى كوچا باشقارمىسى	Kuënlun yoli kocha bashqarmisi	650203003
Yinhe Road Subdistrict	银河路街道	Yínhélù Jiēdào	سامانيولى كوچا باشقارمىسى	Samanyoli kocha bashqarmisi	650203004
Wuwuxinzhen Subdistrict	五五新镇街道	Wǔwǔxīnzhèn Jiēdào	ئەللىكبەش بازىرى كوچا باشقارمىسى	Ellikbesh baziri kocha bashqarmisi	650203007
Yingbin Subdistrict	迎宾街道	Yíngbīn Jiēdào	مەرھابا كوچا باشقارمىسى	Merhaba kocha bashqarmisi	650203007
Guhai Subdistrict	古海街道	Gǔhǎi Jiēdào			650203008
Town
Xiaoguai Township	小拐乡	Xiǎoguǎi Xiāng	شۆگەي يېزىسى	Shögey yëzisi	650203200
