= Kadisha (disambiguation) =

Kadisha may refer to:

== People ==
- Neil Kadisha
- Kadisha Onalbayeva
- Saba Kadisha
- Kadisha Mamyrbekkyzy

== Other ==
- Chevra kadisha
- Asra Kadisha
- Kadisha River
- Kadisha Valley
