= Kazakhstan–Spain relations =

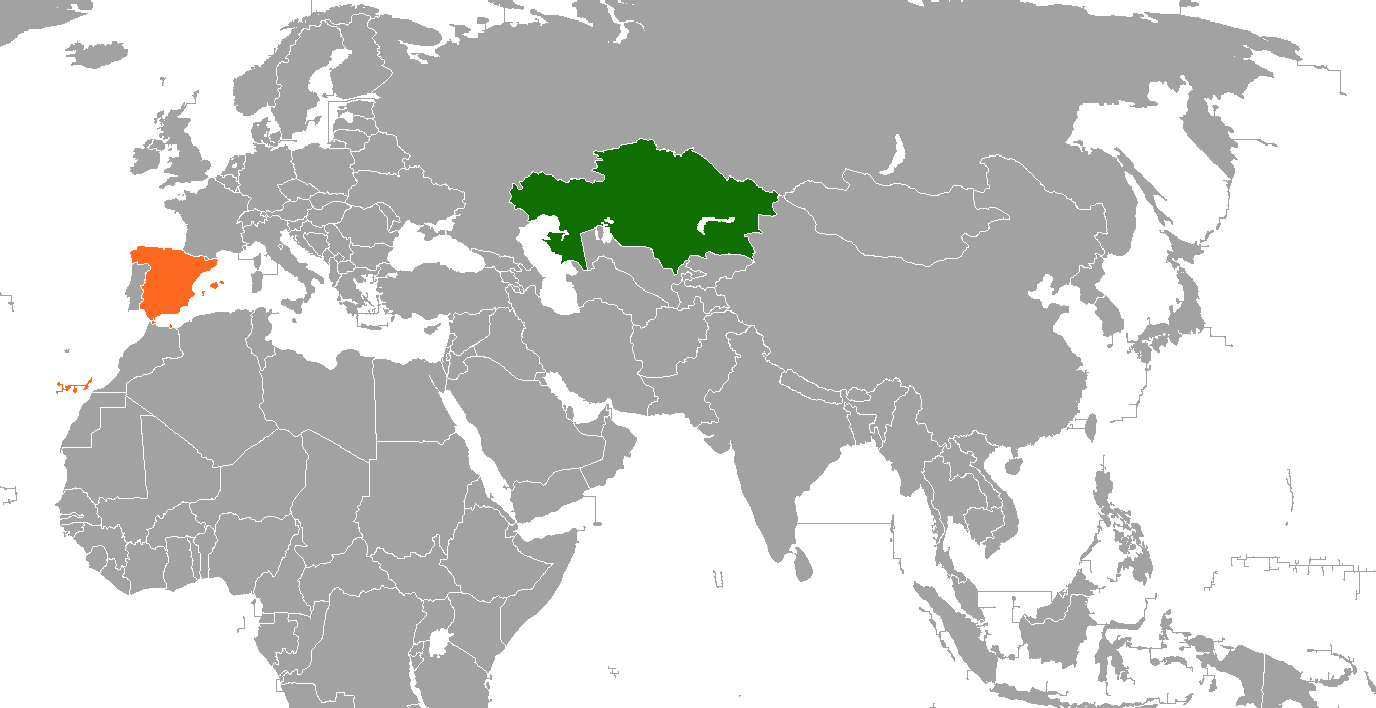

- Kazakhstan: Spain

Kazakhstan–Spain relations are the bilateral relations between Kazakhstan and Spain. Both nations are members of the Organization for Security and Co-operation in Europe.

== History ==
After the dissolution of the Soviet Union, Kazakhstan became an independent nation in December 1991. On 11 February 1992, Kazakhstan and Spain established diplomatic relations. In 1999, Spain opened a resident embassy in the former capital of Almaty before moving the embassy to Astana in 2006. That same year, Kazakhstan opened a resident embassy in Madrid.

Since the initial establishment of diplomatic relations, both nations have worked closely within multinational forums such as the Organization for Security and Co-operation in Europe. In 2017, Spain participated in the Expo 2017 being held in Astana.

Since independence, many Kazakhs, notably including students seeking a European higher education, have moved to Spain, thus enlarging the local Kazakh diaspora in cities like Madrid, Torrevieja, Barcelona, San Sebastián, and Valencia. The diaspora includes painter Tolqyn Saqbaeva, among others.

== High-level visits ==
High-level from Kazakhstan to Spain

- President Nursultan Nazarbayev (2008, 2013)

High-level from Spain to Kazakhstan

- King Juan Carlos I (2007)
- Prime Minister José Luis Rodríguez Zapatero (2011)
- Prime Minister Mariano Rajoy (2013)

== Agreements ==
Since 1992, both nations have signed several bilateral agreements such as Agreement on the Reciprocal Promotion and Protection of Investments (1995); Agreement on Economic and Industrial Cooperation (1997); Agreement on Cultural, Educational and Scientific Cooperation (1997); Agreement to transport equipment and military personnel through Kazakh territory for Spanish stabilization and reconstruction in Afghanistan (2009); Agreement on the Elimination of Visas for Diplomatic Passport Holders (2009); Agreement on Tourism Cooperation (2009); Extradition Treaty (2012) and an Agreement on Military Cooperation (2013).

== Trade ==
In 2015, trade between Kazakhstan and Spain totaled €1.3 billion Euros. Kazakhstan's main exports to Spain include: combustibles and lubricants, copper based products, inorganic chemical products, steel products and electrical equipment. Spain's main exports to Kazakhstan include: vehicles, air navigation equipment, construction equipment, clothing and shoes.

== Resident diplomatic missions ==
- Kazakhstan has an embassy in Madrid and a consulate in Barcelona.
- Spain has an embassy in Astana.
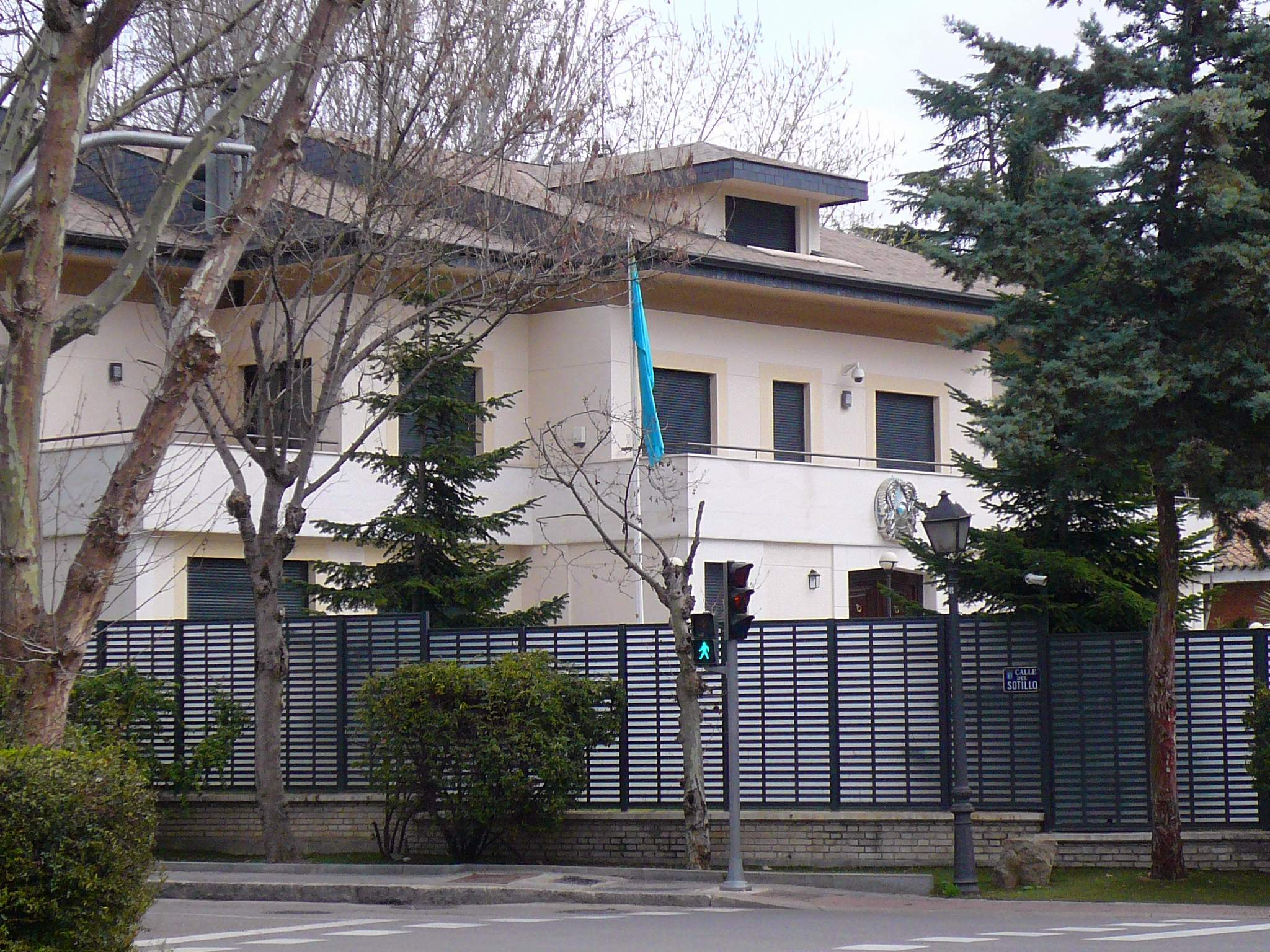
Embassy of Kazakhstan in Madrid

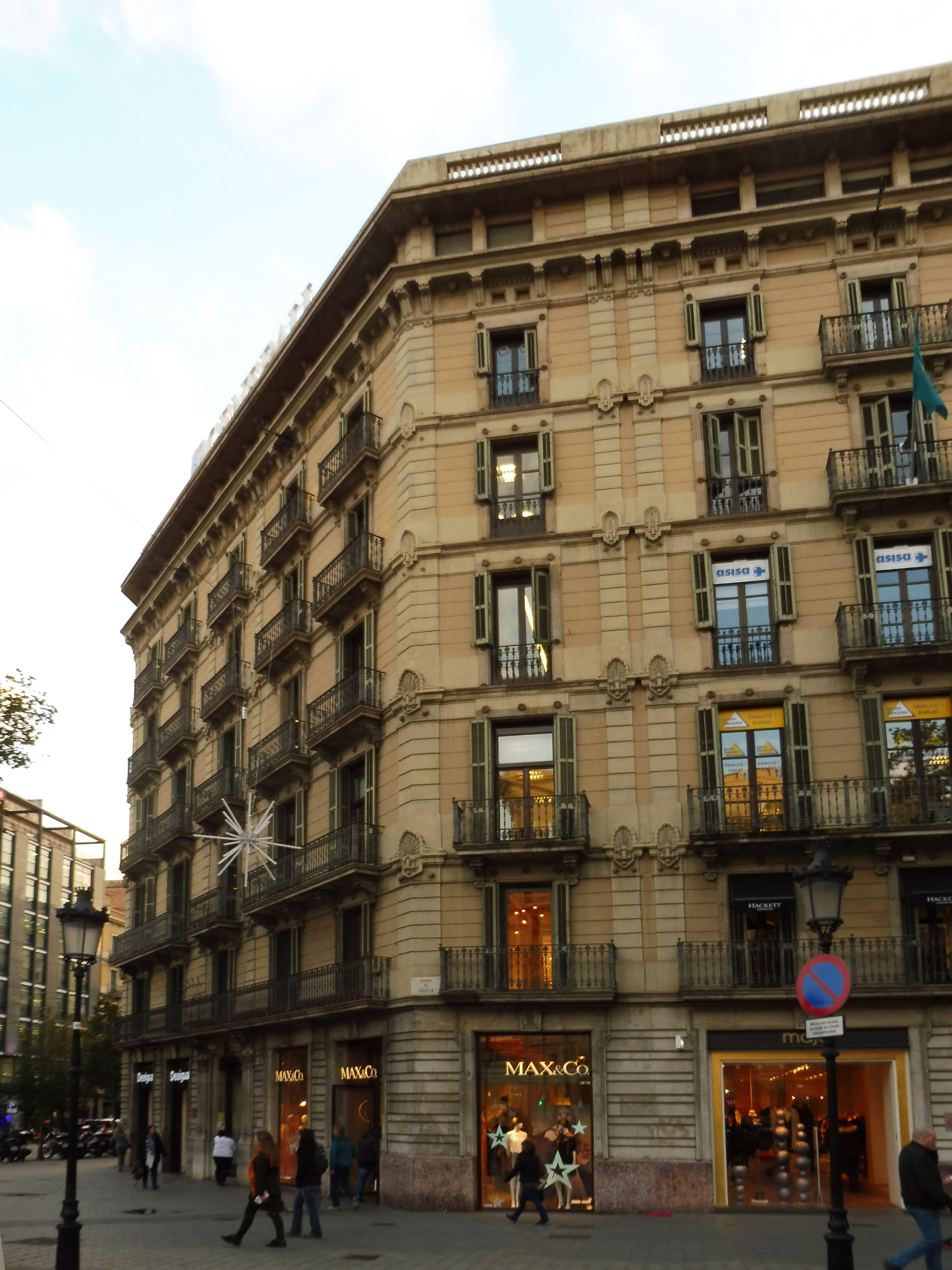
Consulate of Kazakhstan in Barcelona

== See also ==
- Foreign relations of Kazakhstan
- Foreign relations of Spain
