= Oralman =

Kazakh diaspora who immigrate to Kazakhstan

Oralman (Kazakh: Оралман, lit. 'returnee') is a term used by Kazakh authorities to describe Kazakh diaspora who have immigrated or returned to Kazakhstan since the country gained independence from the Soviet Union in 1991.

On 31 December 1991, just over two weeks after Kazakhstan declared independence, the country's first president, Nursultan Nazarbayev, delivered a radio address to ethnic Kazakhs living abroad, announcing that Kazakhstan was prepared to facilitate their repatriation. Preparations also began for the first World Kurultai of Kazakhs.

According to Article 1 of the Law of the Republic of Kazakhstan "On Migration" of December 13, 1997, the official term is kandas (Kazakh: қандас, "compatriot", "same-blood"): "Kandas [compatriots] are Kazakh foreigners or stateless persons who permanently resided outside the Republic of Kazakhstan at the time of independence and came to Kazakhstan for permanent residence."

Oralman usually come from the neighboring countries of China, Mongolia, Uzbekistan, Russia, Turkmenistan, and Kyrgyzstan, but also from countries with small Kazakh minorities such as Iran (Iranian Kazakhs), Afghanistan, and Pakistan.

== Distribution ==
Oralman typically settle in areas of Kazakhstan adjacent to or near their former homes, either because of climate or convenience. Thus, returnees from Uzbekistan and Kyrgyzstan are often found in the south of Kazakhstan, while those from China and Mongolia are concentrated in the east. The government prefers to settle them in the north of the country, and offers them more benefits to resettle there; however, returnees themselves prefer regions such as the south where the Russian language is less important in everyday life.

According to research done by LSAR (Laboratory for Social and Anthropological Research), the Oralman can be divided into two general groups: those who returned in the 1990s and those who returned in the 2000s. The research showed that Oralman from the 1990s did not interact with Oralman from the 2000s, as the former saw themselves as locals and identified more closely with local Kazakhs. The research also described internal differences among Oralman depending on where they came from and what cultural values they had, with differences mainly rooted in language. Overall, they were able to discover several major divisions through asking samples of Oralman to describe who they see as "We" vs. "They":

- Russians – Kazakhs
- Russians – Oralman
- Local Kazakhs – Oralman
- Oralman from Mongolia – Oralman from China
- Early Oralman – recently arrived Oralman
- Oralman in urban environments – Oralman in Shyghys
- Oralman from Altay Prefecture (China) – Oralman from Tacheng Prefecture (China)

== Ethnic Kazakhs in China ==
According to Astrid Cerny's research paper, Going where the grass is greener: China Kazakhs and the Oralman immigration policy in Kazakhstan, approximately 1.1 million ethnic Kazakhs live in the Xinjiang Uighur Autonomous Region in the north of China. According to Cerny, this diaspora rose from the mass exodus that Kazakhstan faced in the 20th century. Cerny claims that the recent phenomenon of former ethnic Kazakhs willing to return to their motherland stems from a desire to maintain and strengthen cultural identity, as assimilating into different cultures has proved to be difficult for ethnic Kazakhs in China. According to the research paper, a combination of economic, ecological, and socio-political factors drove people to leave their countries of residence and return to their area of ethnic origin.

== Government repatriation initiatives ==
=== Integration centers ===
One of the key issues in tackling the migration issue in Kazakhstan is to support the repatriation process of Kazakhs returning to Kazakhstan. The Republic of Kazakhstan has launched several integration centers for the temporary residence of the Oralman since 2008 in cities such as Karaganda and Shymkent and throughout the South. Through these centers, the government has tried to implement and ensure legal consultations, support for learning state languages, as well as support for vocational training and professional development.

=== The nation-building initiative ===
Since the beginning of Kazakh sovereignty in the early 1990s, Kazakh repatriates from abroad began to be co-ethnically reintegrated into Kazakh society. In response, Kazakh government policy has revolved around building a state for its titular ethnicity in order to overcome issues of Russification and promote the use of the Kazakh language. According to Kazakh migration policy, Kazakh ethnic purity is kept untouched even if repatriates have been abroad for generations.

The government's nation-building policy stresses that the repatriates need to contribute to Kazakhstan rather than becoming a social burden. Kazakhstan's migration and citizenship policies are based on the idea of Kazakh self-identification. The Kazakh government maintains that the only ethnic center for Kazakhs is and will be Kazakhstan itself. Government policy seeks to restore historical justice and describe the colonial past that forced people to flee Kazakhstan. However, sustaining such a consistent and effective migratory policy has been difficult.

Since Kazakhstan's independence, the country has struggled to sustain a large number of repatriates. One of the reasons for this is the unsustainable number of repatriates receiving financial support from the government, as Kazakhstan has been hit by economic crisis. For instance, the government planned to provide 10,000 households annually, but this proved impossible to sustain, and quotas had to be set as low as 500 households. However, as the country became more sustainable and achieved higher annual economic growth, the government began to refocus on the Oralman dilemma. For instance, in December 2008 it adopted the Nurly Kosh (Bright Move) program, aiming to effectively situate immigrants, as well as repatriates, with employment and housing.

== Reintegration issues faced by Oralman ==
According to Natsuko, Kazakh locals generally consider repatriates as the "other" and not "authentic" co-ethnics. Local communities claim that Oralman share the Kazakh ethnicity only through name and that the special government treatment of repatriates is unfair.

Linguistic differences also challenge Oralman reintegration. Kazakhs, Mongolians, and Russians usually write with Cyrillic script. However, Turkmens and Uzbeks usually use Latin alphabets, and repatriates from Latinized countries generally have difficulty learning Cyrillic script, which eventually creates problems for them in secondary and higher education. Many Kazakhs prefer a gradual shift to the Russian language, whereas Oralman have preserved the Kazakh language. This cultural division between native Kazakhs and Oralman has complicated the nation-building process, but it is likely to no longer be an issue by 2025, once Kazakhstan officially completes its transition from Cyrillic to Latin script.

Oralman often face difficulty integrating into the labor market and communicating due to insufficient command of the Russian language, which remains an important Lingua Franca in Kazakhstan. On a separate note, Oralman from China form the majority of Mandarin teachers at universities in Kazakhstan.

On the other hand, Oralman who have attained higher education abroad may receive unnecessary state support that would better serve local Kazakhs, as the Kazakh government can not afford to provide both returnees and locals with consistent financial support. Furthermore, the repatriates see themselves, rather than locals, as genuine Kazakhs, as they have been able to preserve an "authentic" Kazakh identity even after living abroad for generations. This superior self-identity further alienates repatriates from local communities.

The Kazakh government understands that, in many ways, Oralman have preserved traditional Kazakh customs and identity, and are able to contribute to reviving traditional Kazakh culture both abroad and within Kazakhstan, as through decades of Russification, native Kazakhs have been stripped of uniquely Kazakh culture. Despite the professed cultural value of Oralman, many repatriates have been faced with prejudice from locals. Many locals espouse critical perceptions of repatriates, raising the questions “Why does the government give people from China and Mongolia so much money?" and "Why don’t they give it to people from Kazakhstan to make their lives better?”. Oralman are sometimes portrayed as uneducated and welfare-dependent resettlers who harm to Kazakh society. Despite this perception, the Kazakh government has set Oralman as state priorities that boost the ethnic Kazakh population, which has risen by nearly 20% since Kazakh independence. The government considers that use of the Kazakh language will be boosted by Oralman and would speed the Kazakh-ification of Russian-dominated regions in the north. A rising sense of nationalism and cultural identity has been observed in Kazakhstan since the beginning of the Russo-Ukrainian war, which was a trigger event for the Kazakh government to expand its repatriation efforts and promote the strengthening of its nation-building program.

Although there existed dissent surrounding the reintegration of the Kazakh repatriates through the nation-building process, there has not been substantial widespread cultural or ethnic conflicts between Kazakhs, repatriates, and minority groups, as non-Kazakh minorities and ethnic Kazakh citizens have not objected to the Kazakh-oriented state-building process.

One aspect that gives the reintegration process impetus is the absence of political counterforce towards current migratory policies, and it seems unlikely that political resistance to reintegration will develop. Natsuko Oka writes, describing the weight of the reintegration issue on the Kazakh community and state, "Having defined itself as the state for all Kazakhs of the world, Kazakhstan has entitled co-ethnics with the right of return to their ancestral homeland to become full-fledged citizens. If the government declares that the state cannot accept ethnic brethren any more, such a decision will surely invite severe criticism from Kazakh nationalists as well as immigrants, who will readily cast the ruling elites as traitors to the Kazakh nation. On the other hand, instability in the society will only grow worse if new immigrants continue to arrive while the integration of those who already have settled barely proceeds, and their social problems remain unsolved. Kazakhstan finds itself caught in a dilemma: because of its ethnic roots and decolonization agenda, Kazakh repatriation policy cannot be easily abandoned even if it creates more problems than benefits."

== Oralman identity issues ==
Identity is a complicated issue. According to E. Erickson's theory of identity, one's self-image integrates with the surrounding world, which can manifest into successful sublimations, active protective mechanisms, preferable potentials, etc. Ethnicity plays an important role in issues of personal and group identity in Kazakhstan, as it forms the basis for understanding objective characteristics features such as place of birth, language, socioeconomic status, race, etc.

According to a study published in the Kazakh-American Free University Academic Journal on the ethno-linguistic identities of repatriates in modern Kazakhstan, repatriates between the ages of 17–25 were identified as generally having undergone the identity crisis "Who am I?". Along with this identity issue, repatriates also undergo problems in receiving secondary education in their mother tongue. Most of the time they are taught either through a bilingual secondary program or only in Kazakh, which causes a spill-over effect on the education system of other states and places huge strains in adaptational programs for repatriates.

Other factors influence repatriate identity, such as ethnic-linguistic identification, including the level of proficiency in their language, socio-economic situation, and residence area. Identity loss and the ethnic-linguistic issue among Kazakh repatriates is dependent on many factors and highly individual-specific.

== Correlation of the 2011 Zhanaozen Massacre and the Oralman ==
The 2011 labor worker strike massacre in the city of Zhanaozen in the Mangistau Region brought negative public opinion towards the Oralman, who allegedly provoked the killing. More than 12 people died in the incident, and the oil workers' demand for higher wages and better working conditions was denied. The Oralman were criticized by the Chairman of the Board of the National Welfare Fund Samruk-Kazyna as defectors and instigators of the strike. Kazakh nationalists labeled this insult as discriminatory towards the Oralman, as well as an attempt at defaming the group. It is believed that immigration of repatriates into the region seriously burdened local authorities. Due to this, the government temporarily reconsidered its quota system, reducing it for the next 4 months. According to Oka Natsuko in A Note on Ethnic Return Migration Policy in Kazakhstan: Changing Priorities and a Growing Dilemma, the Zhanaozen incident indicated that the government had failed to create an effective scheme for utilizing labor and satisfying the needs of Kazakh immigrants.

== See also ==
- Kazakh exodus from Xinjiang
