= Qazhyghumar Shabdanuly =

Kazakh Chinese dissident writer (1925–2011)

- قاجىعۇمار شابدانۇلى
- Born: 1925; Tansyq, East Kazakhstan Region, Kazakh SSR, Soviet Union
- Died: February 11, 2011 (aged 85–86); Qoqek, Tacheng Prefecture, Ili Kazakh Autonomous Prefecture, Xinjiang, China
- Occupations: writer; political activist
- Writing career
- Language: Kazakh language

Chinese name
- Simplified Chinese: 哈吉乌玛尔·夏布旦
- Traditional Chinese: 哈吉烏瑪爾·夏布旦
Transcriptions
Standard Mandarin
- Hanyu Pinyin: Hājíwūmǎ'ěr Xiàbùdàn

Russian name
- Russian: Кажигумар Шабданулы

Kazakh name
- Kazakh: قاجىعۇمار شابدانۇلى; Қажығұмар Шабданұлы; Qajyğūmar Şabdanūly

Qazhyghumar Shabdanuly (Kazakh: قاجىعۇمار شابدانۇلى; 1925 – 11 February 2011) was a Kazakh Chinese political activist and a Kazakh-language dissident writer. For more than forty years, Qazhyghumar was imprisoned by the People's Republic of China for his political views.

== Biography ==
Qazhyghumar was born in 1925 in the village of Tansyq in Eastern Kazakhstan, then in the Soviet Union. Soon, the family fled from the 1932–1933 famine to Xinjiang. Shabdanuly's problems with Chinese law began during the 1944–1946 Ili Rebellion.

During the Cultural Revolution, Qazhyghumar participated in a nationalist Kirghiz-Kazakh Society. In 1958 he was arrested and imprisoned for both "left wing" and "ultra right" political activities. He was sentenced to 22 years and served if full-time in Tarim camps of the Taklamakan Desert. Qazhyghumar was released in 1980, and in 1982 published the first volume of his magnum opus, Qylmys (Crime), in Ürümqi. The second volume was printed in 1985. The third and the fourth volumes were already set for printing when Qazhyghumar was arrested again. This time he was charged with running a Kazakh separatist organization and feeding intelligence to Kazakhstan. Qazhyghumar was sentenced to thirteen years and again served the full term in Ürümqi jail.

The first independent edition of Qazhyghumar 's history novel Pana (Shelter) was published in Kazakhstan in 2005. Qazhyghumar's original Kazakh text was in the Arabic script, and was transcribed into Cyrillic by Qabdesh Jumadilov. The first complete six-volume edition of Qylmys was printed in Almaty in 2009. In January 2010, it was nominated for Kazakh state prize in literature. The nominator presented Qylmys as "a book about the colonization of the Kazakh territories, which gives a clear picture of what Kazakhs went through under the imperial pressure of China and the Soviet Union". However, the government commissioners stonewalled the proposal and struck the book off the nominations' list.

As of July 2010, Qazhyghumar remained under house arrest in Chuguchak. Kazakh nationalist organizations advised president Nursultan Nazarbayev to demand full freedom for Qazhyghumar but, as of 2010, limited government efforts brought no result. According to Qazhyghumar's daughter Jaynar, who lives in Almaty and is a citizen of Kazakhstan, the Chinese government regularly refused to let Qazhyghumar leave the country. He has five surviving adult children, four of them remain in China. According to Jaynar, her mother and her siblings in China are able to travel from China to Kazakhstan and back.

== See also ==
- Oralman, re-immigration of ethnic Kazakhs to Kazakhstan
- Kazakh exodus from Xinjiang
