= Kazakhs in China =

Turkic ethnic group in Xinjiang, China

Total population
- 1,562,518 (2020 census)

Regions with significant populations
- Xinjiang (Ili Kazakh Autonomous Prefecture, Barkol Kazakh Autonomous County, Mori Kazakh Autonomous County) and Gansu (Aksai Kazakh Autonomous County)

Languages
- Kazakh, Mandarin

Religion
- Islam

Related ethnic groups
- Uyghurs, Salar people, Kyrgyz in China, Uzbeks in China

Chinese name
- Simplified Chinese: 中国哈萨克族
- Traditional Chinese: 中國哈薩克族
Transcriptions
Standard Mandarin
- Hanyu Pinyin: Zhōngguó Hāsàkèzú

Dunganese name
- Dungan: Җунгуй хазахзў

Kazakh name
- Kazakh: جۇڭگو قازاقتارى; Қытайда қазақтар Qytaida qazaqtar [qɤ̆tʰaɪtá qasaχtʰáɚ]

Kazakhs in China (Chinese: 中国哈萨克族; Kazakh: جۇڭگو قازاقتارى) form the largest community of Kazakhs outside Kazakhstan. They are one of the 56 ethnic groups officially recognized by the People's Republic of China. There is one Kazakh autonomous prefecture – Ili in Xinjiang – and three Kazakh autonomous counties – Aksay in Gansu, and Barkol and Mori in Xinjiang.

== History ==
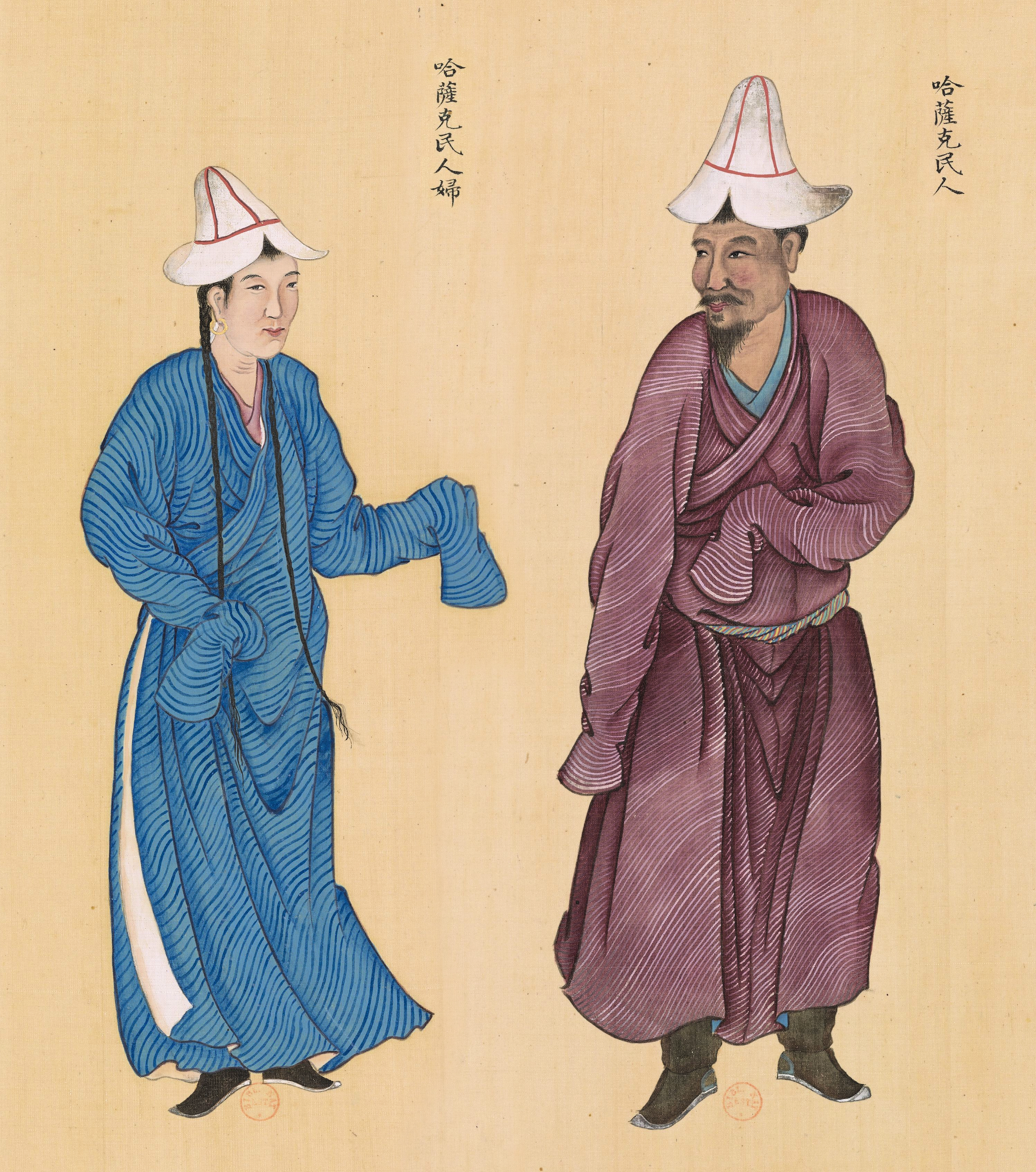
Huang Qing Zhigong Tu, a Kazakh commoner with his wife, depicted in 1769

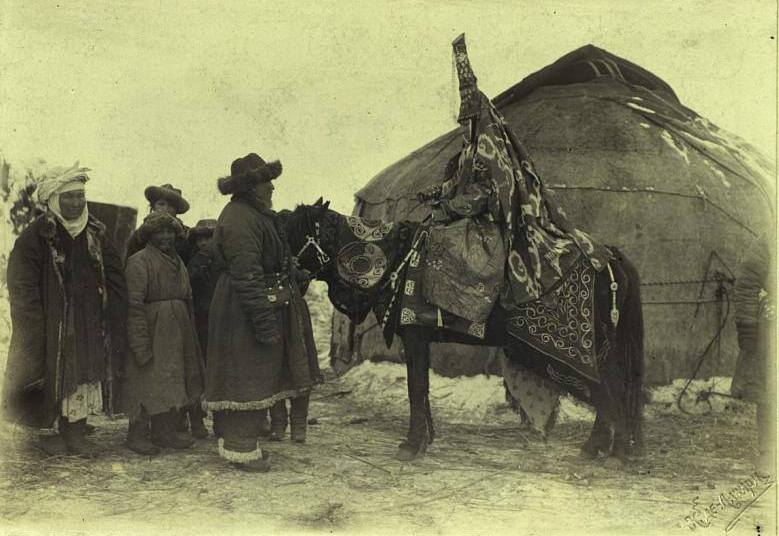
Kazakh nomads in the 19th century

=== Background ===
In the early 13th century, Genghis Khan granted the vast Kipchak steppe west of the Irtysh River to his eldest son Jochi, forming the “Jochi Ulus,” i.e., the Jochid Khanate. Later, Jochi died before Genghis Khan, and Jochi's second son Batu Khan succeeded him. After the victory of the Mongol invasion of Europe in 1242, he established his capital at Sarai on the lower reaches of the Volga River along the northern shore of the Caspian Sea, formally founding the state, which became known as the Kipchak Khanate or the Golden Horde. Batu granted a region roughly corresponding to modern Kazakhstan to his elder brother Orda Khan, forming the White Horde; and granted a region north of the White Horde to his younger brother Shiban, forming the Blue Horde.

The areas east of the Golden Horde, including both sides of the Tian Shan and the Transoxiana region to the south, belonged to the Chagatai Khanate, ruled by Genghis Khan's second son Chagatai Khan and his descendants. In the mid-14th century, the Chagatai Khanate split, after which the Timurid Empire rose and at one time dominated Central Asia. In the first half of the 15th century, the Timurid Empire declined, and nomadic tribes from the northern Kipchak steppe known as the Uzbeks took the opportunity to move south and occupy the oasis regions of Transoxiana. In the mid-15th century, a descendant of Shiban, Abu'l-Khayr Khan, became the leader of the Uzbeks; his grandfather was Ibrahim, a khan of the Blue Horde. Meanwhile, two grandsons of the White Horde khan Urus Khan—Kerei and Janibek Khan—fell out with Abu'l-Khayr, led their followers to independence, occupied the steppe north of the Syr Darya River, and in August 1465 established the Kazakh Khanate.

Even before the founding of the Kazakh Khanate, the Kazakhs had established direct contact with the Western Regions. In 1456, Kerei and Janibek sought refuge with the Eastern Chagatai Khanate, which then ruled the Western Regions. Khan Esen Buqa granted them the western part of the Semirechye region along his western frontier. The establishment of this territory laid the initial foundation for the Kazakh Khanate. From then until the 16th century, the two states sometimes cooperated against enemies and intermarried, but also fought each other. In the late 16th century, a group of Oirats migrated from the western Mongolian steppe across the Altai Mountains into the Western Regions, and later entered the Kazakh Steppe. In 1640, the Dzungar tribe unified the Oirat Mongols and established the Dzungar Khanate; in 1680, the Dzungars defeated the Yarkent Khanate in southern Xinjiang and unified the regions north and south of the Tian Shan. In early conflicts, the Kazakhs under Tauke Khan achieved some victories, but overall were at a disadvantage. After Tauke Khan's death, the Kazakh Khanate split into three “zhuzes” (hordes): the Great, Middle, and Little. From 1723 to 1728, Dzungar forces penetrated deep into the Kazakh steppe and eventually controlled the Great Zhuz. Meanwhile, the Tsarist Russia also invaded the Kazakh Khanate from the west and north. By the mid-18th century, the Little Zhuz was annexed by Tsarist Russia, the Great Zhuz became subordinate to the Dzungar Khanate, and the Middle Zhuz was under dual control by both powers.

In 1745, the Dzungar khan Galdan Tseren died of illness, and his son Tsewang Dorji Namjal succeeded him. In 1749, the young and reckless Namjal, who neglected state affairs, imprisoned his sister Olan Bayar, who had been managing governance on his behalf. Her husband Sayn Bolek supported Darja, the illegitimate eldest son of Galdan Tseren, and sent troops to Ili to imprison Namjal. Because Darja's mother was of low status, some high-born nobles opposed his succession and plotted to enthrone the younger son of Galdan Tseren, Tsewang Dash, but the plot was exposed before it could be carried out. Tsewang Dash was executed, the conspirator Dashi Dawa was killed, and Dawachi and Amursana fled to the Kazakh Khanate, seeking refuge with Ablai of the Middle Zhuz. In 1753, Amursana and Dawachi launched a surprise attack on Ili, killed Darja, and Dawachi succeeded as Khong Tayiji. Soon afterward, Amursana and Dawachi fell out; the disadvantaged Amursana sought help from Ablai. Dawachi was defeated and abandoned the capital Ili, retreating to Bortala. Kazakh forces carried out widespread looting and destruction in Ili, burning the Gurzha Temple and Hainuk Temple. In 1754, Dawachi counterattacked, and Amursana was defeated and fled to the Qing. In July 1755, the Qianlong Emperor of the Qing launched a western campaign, and Qing forces swiftly defeated Dawachi and pacified Ili. In August 1755, Amursana rebelled against the Qing and declared independence. In March 1756, Qing forces again captured Ili, and Amursana fled to the Middle Zhuz. In 1757, Amursana fell out with Ablai, who then submitted to the Qing and became known as the “Left Kazakhs.” In 1758, during the suppression of Amursana's rebellion, Qing forces advanced into the territory of the Great Zhuz; the Great Zhuz, already subordinate to the Dzungar Khanate, surrendered and became a Qing vassal, known as the “Right Kazakhs.”

Regarding how to govern the Kazakh tribes, the Qing court initially believed that, since they had submitted, direct administration should be implemented. However, the Qianlong Emperor considered the Kazakhs too distant from the interior and decided to adopt a loose Jimi system of indirect rule. Thus, after submission, the Kazakhs retained their original system. At Ablai Khan's request, the Qing court granted titles to various tribes and opened trade at Ulungur. However, regarding Ablai's request that the Qing allow Kazakhs to pasture in former Dzungar lands near Tarbagatai, the Qing government politely declined in an imperial edict.

=== Entry into Inner Territory ===
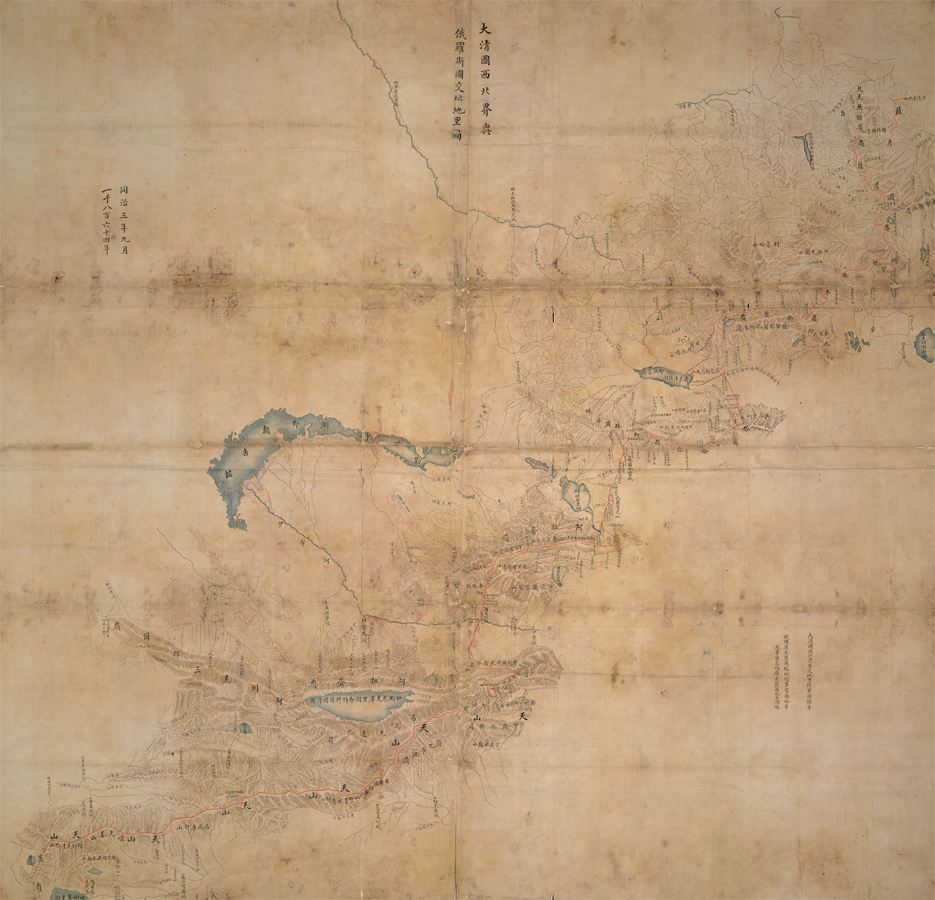
The Sino-Russian northwestern border in 1864

In the final years of the Dzungar Khanate, widespread epidemics, continuous civil wars, and heavy population losses significantly reduced the Dzungar population. At the same time, many tribes migrated to Russia, Kazakhstan, and other regions of China.

With the fall of the Dzungar Khanate in the mid-18th century, the Manchus of the Qing Dynasty massacred the native Dzungars of Dzungaria in the Dzungar genocide. During the Qing campaign to pacify the Dzungars, many rebellious or suspected rebellious tribes were exterminated by Qing forces, while even non-rebellious groups were often incorporated into the Eight Banners or relocated to northern Mongolia. After the campaign, the Dzungar population had fallen to roughly one-tenth of its peak, leaving vast areas of former pastureland empty. Among the peoples who migrated into depopulated Dzungaria were the Kazakhs from the Kazakh Khanates, although this migration was small and disrupted by the later Sino–Kazakh Wars that also saw Kazakhs massacred.

After the Qing conquest of Xinjiang, the Kazakhs submitted to Qing rule and requested permission to graze in the former Dzungar pastures in Ili and Tarbagatai. The Qing government rejected this request. In 1760, the Qing court ordered that all intruders crossing into the region be expelled. However, cross-border grazing increased steadily, with Kazakh groups frequently entering Qing territory. The Qing government was forced to strengthen border controls and expel unauthorized crossers.

In 1762, the Qing government established the office of the Ili General to govern military and civil affairs in Xinjiang. His jurisdiction included a vast area east and south of Lake Balkhash, bringing Kazakh groups between Ili, Tarbagatai, Altai, and Balkhash under Qing rule.

From 1766 onward, due to sparse population in frontier regions, the Qing adopted an “open admission and resettlement” policy for voluntarily submitting Kazakhs. They were assigned grazing lands and taxed at a rate of one percent. As a result, Kazakh migration into Qing territory increased, and regions such as Ili, Tarbagatai, and Zaisan became major Kazakh pastoral areas.

However, after the return of more than 70,000 Torghut Mongols in 1771 and the continued settlement of Kazakhs, available pastureland became increasingly limited. In 1776, the Qing government restricted admission, allowing only Kazakhs with relatives inside the border to settle. Despite this, illegal crossings continued, especially during harsh winters, sometimes leading to clashes with border troops.

In 1790, Kazakh leader Kukudai of the Abak Kerei tribe visited Beijing and was granted the title of Prince of the First Rank. In 1794, the Qing allowed Kazakhs to graze in designated “interior-border buffer zones” after paying taxes. Following this legalization, Kazakh migration increased significantly, spreading from Altai into Tarbagatai, Bogda, Barkol, and Manas.

By the early 19th century, these buffer zones had effectively become permanent Kazakh grazing territories within Qing-controlled Xinjiang.

In 1864, the Qing government signed the Treaty of Chuguchak with the Russian Empire, losing large territories east and south of Lake Balkhash. Kazakhs in these newly ceded areas were placed under Russian rule. During the chaos of the Dungan Revolt, more than 100,000 Russian Kazakhs crossed into Qing territory.

Among them, descendants of Kukudai's lineage migrated south to the Saur Mountains. In 1864, local uprisings in Xinjiang further destabilized the region, and in 1871 Russian forces occupied Ili under the pretext of Kazakh migration movements.

In the 19th century, the advance of the Russian Empire pushed Kazakh populations into neighboring regions. Russian settlers on traditional Kazakh lands displaced many people across the border into China, contributing to an increase in the Kazakh population there.

After the Qing reconquest of Xinjiang in 1878, Kazakhs were resettled depending on whether they wished to remain under Russian or Qing rule. Those choosing Russia were allowed to leave, while others were resettled within Qing territory.

In 1884, Xinjiang was formally established as a province. The Ili General continued to oversee frontier military affairs, while Altai was later separated into a new administrative office. The Qing also introduced a hierarchical tribal governance system among Kazakhs, including ranks such as princes, beis, taiji, and others, while implementing fixed taxation.

By the late Qing period, increasing taxation and administrative control led many Kazakhs in Altai to migrate toward northern Xinjiang, Barkol, Mulei, Ürümqi, and Manas, with some moving further into Qinghai. This migration pattern largely shaped the modern distribution of Kazakh populations in China.

=== Republican period ===
After the establishment of the Republic of China, Yang Zengxin was appointed by Yuan Shikai as Military Governor of Xinjiang, and later served for a long time as Governor of Xinjiang. The Ili General was renamed Ili Frontier Defense Commissioner, and the Altai Amban was renamed Altai Administrative Commissioner, both still directly under the central government. In 1914, Ili was changed to a garrison commissioner and placed under the jurisdiction of Xinjiang Province. In 1916, the Tarbagatai counselor was changed to circuit intendant, concurrently administering Kazakh tribes, under the authority of the Xinjiang governor and military governor. In 1919, Altai was also changed to a circuit and incorporated into Xinjiang Province. During Yang's administration of Xinjiang, he adopted a policy of conciliation and balance in ethnic and religious affairs. As a traditional scholar-official, Yang Zengxin governed Xinjiang in a more traditional manner, emphasizing agriculture and traditional handicrafts, extensively constructing irrigation canals and reclaiming wasteland, and developing the wool processing industry in Uyghur and Kazakh regions. Under his rule, Xinjiang society prospered, order was maintained, and ethnic and religious tensions were greatly eased.

In 1912, Kazakh leaders such as Zhakreya (Zhamurke) and Baimura from Altai led a Kazakh delegation to Beijing. The Beiyang government conferred titles: Ailin was granted the title of prince (junwang), Wumurtai was made a duke, and Mami and Zakariya were made beizi, with 12 taiji and 12 ukurtai established under them.

In 1916, during World War I, dissatisfaction with Russian conscription policies triggered a large-scale anti-Russian uprising in Central Asia known as the Basmachi movement. More than 200,000 people from various ethnic groups fled into Xinjiang, China, with Kazakhs forming the largest group. Yang Zengxin ordered counties to designate areas to resettle them. In 1928, Yang Zengxin was assassinated, and Jin Shuren succeeded him as chairman of Xinjiang. In the early 1930s, Joseph Stalin launched agricultural collectivization, leading to widespread famine, including the Kazakh famine of 1930–1933, causing many Kazakhs to flee to China. In addition to famine, Soviet-led class struggle policies also affected Kazakhs: wealthy individuals labeled as “bai” had their property redistributed, prompting some to migrate to China. In 1930, Dali Lihan Sugurbayev of the Kerey tribe returned with his people from Uliastai (Outer Mongolia) to Altai. In 1932, the Kumul Rebellion broke out, and the Hui warlord Ma Zhongying entered Xinjiang. Kazakhs in the Fuhai area revolted and attacked Chenghua Temple multiple times. In 1933, Ma Zhongying's subordinate Ma Rulong attacked Altai, while Sharif Khan resisted, forcing Ma's forces to withdraw.

In 1933, Sheng Shicai came to power through a coup and became provisional governor of Xinjiang. Relying on the Soviet Union, he pursued pro-Soviet policies. However, due to harsh exploitation under Sheng, Kazakhs began migrating to Gansu and Qinghai from 1934 onward. By 1938, about 18,000 Kerey Kazakhs had moved there. Multiple migration waves occurred, often suffering interception and hardship. Conflicts with Mongols and attempts to migrate further into Tibet also led to violence and heavy losses.

In 1936, after Sheng Shicai expelled 30,000 Kazakhs from Xinjiang to Qinghai, Hui Chinese led by General Ma Bufang massacred Kazakhs, until there were only 135 of them left.

In 1942, Sheng Shicai shifted allegiance to the Nationalist government, and the Soviet Union began supporting oppressed ethnic groups in Xinjiang.

In 1943, Dali Lihan Sugurbayev returned from the Soviet Union to Altai. Armed uprisings spread across northern Xinjiang. On November 12, 1944, the East Turkestan Republic was established in Yining. Violence and massacres occurred before being controlled by the provisional government.

On April 8, 1945, various armed groups were unified into the Ili National Army under Soviet General Ivan Polinov. The army expanded control beyond the Ili Valley. In September, Nationalist forces in Altai surrendered.

After the Sino-Soviet Treaty of Friendship and Alliance in August 1945, Soviet support declined. In 1946, the coalition Xinjiang Provincial Coalition Government was formed under Zhang Zhizhong.

Internal conflicts continued between pro-Soviet and traditionalist Kazakh leaders, especially between Osman Batur and Dali Lihan. Armed clashes occurred through 1946–1947.

In 1948, the Xinjiang League for the Protection of Peace and Democracy was established, rejecting Pan-Islamism and Pan-Turkism and formally adopting the name “Xinjiang.”

Although the Chinese Communist Party had limited influence in Xinjiang at the time, it maintained contacts with local organizations. In 1949, Dali Lihan and other leaders were invited to attend the Chinese People's Political Consultative Conference, but died in the Baikalsk plane crash while en route via the Soviet Union.

=== People's Republic ===
On 26 September 1949, Bao Erhan Shahidi, chairman of the Xinjiang provincial government of the Nationalist Government, officially declared a rebellion via telegram and reorganized the provincial government into the Provisional People's Government of Xinjiang Province, temporarily maintaining provincial administration while awaiting instructions from the Central People's Government.

On 1 October 1949, the People's Republic of China was founded. On 12 October, the Chinese Communist Party Central Committee decided to establish the CCP Xinjiang Bureau, with Wang Zhen as secretary. Because troops were still advancing into Xinjiang, the bureau initially had no organizational structure or functioning offices. On 7 November, after Wang Zhen and Xu Liqing arrived in Dihua, the Xinjiang Bureau was formally established.

In December, the People's Government of Xinjiang Province and the Xinjiang Military Region were established. On 29 December, the Nationalist Xinjiang Security Command and its surrendered forces were reorganized into the 22nd Corps of the PLA, marking the peaceful liberation of Xinjiang. Kazakh regions thus became part of the newly established PRC administration. On 10 January 1950, the National Army in Yining was reorganized into the PLA 5th Corps, consisting of the 13th and 14th Divisions, headquartered in Yining. The commander of the 14th Division, Alimjan Ubraimbayev, was Kazakh.

On 28 September 1949, former U.S. vice consul in Dihua and CIA agent Mark Nan left Dihua and later met with Osman Batur in Qitai. On 19 March 1950, Yao Lebos led armed forces from Hami into the southern mountains of Qitai, joining Osman Batur, former Xinjiang finance minister Janimuhan, and elements of the 7th Cavalry Division. In March, Osman Batur was appointed commander-in-chief of the so-called "Anti-Communist National Salvation Army." He and others mobilized over 20,000 pastoralists in rebellion, which quickly spread across northern and southern Xinjiang.

By April, the forces attacked PLA positions in Hami, Qincheng, Xiaobao, Nanshan Pass, and Yiwu, carrying out widespread looting. Over two months, more than 300 incidents occurred, 30 houses were burned, and 130 civilians were killed or injured. The movement was centered in the Hongliuxia area near Qitai. Osman's forces attempted to encircle Barkol and capture Hami, aiming to cut transport routes and advance toward Dihua.

On 15 April, the PLA launched a snowstorm assault on Hongliuxia, forcing Osman to flee. His remnants retreated through Gansu (Dunhuang and Anxi), where joint PLA operations destroyed most of the forces by November 1950. On 19 February 1951, Osman Batur was captured north of the Qaidam Basin. On 29 April, a public trial involving over 80,000 people was held in Dihua, and Osman was executed by firing squad.

Between 1952 and 1953, 300 Kazakh households relocated back to Altai with government approval.

On 22 August 1952, the Second Session of the First People's Congress of Xinjiang Province established the Preparatory Committee for Ethnic Regional Autonomy, with Kazakh Anniwar Gakulin as vice chairman.

On 27 November 1954, the Ili Kazakh Autonomous Prefecture was officially established in Yining. In November 1955, it was renamed the Ili Kazakh Autonomous Prefecture.

In 1954, the Mori Kazakh Autonomous County and Barkol Kazakh Autonomous County were also established. In the early 1960s, during the deterioration of Sino-Soviet relations, the Soviet Union encouraged migration of residents from Khorgos and Tacheng to Kazakhstan, known as the Ili-Tacheng Incident.

In 1951, the Dunhuang County government established a “Work Committee for Resettling Displaced Kazakhs.”

In 1953, a tri-provincial conference (Gansu–Qinghai–Xinjiang) defined Kazakh pastoral regions and policies for autonomy and resettlement. The agreement designated specific grazing zones across Gansu and Qinghai for Kazakh communities. In 1954, the Akesai Kazakh Autonomous County Preparatory Committee was established, and in 1954–1955, the county was formally created.

The arrival of the People's Republic of China at the end of the civil war led to significant changes in Xinjiang. The Kazakhs and other ethnic groups in the region were granted autonomy around governance, language, and religion at first, but the end goal was for the Kazakhs to integrate into the new Chinese State.

In the early stages, this meant high spending on infrastructure and education, aiming to boost agricultural output and literacy respectively. The arrival of the Cultural Revolution saw the end of permissiveness and the beginning of a more hardline policy, as Kazakh party cadres were purged, Islamic practice restricted, and pastoralist herds collectivized. The end of pastoralism was especially harmful, as the connection to the land and nomadic lifestyle remains an important part of the Kazakh identity.

In more outward ways, Xinjiang began to change as well. The Xinjiang Production and Construction Corps began a series of projects aimed at urbanising the region. This, combined with the arrival of Han settlers led to a demographic shift as Kazakh areas were no longer majority Kazakh. This period also saw concerns over separatism, as worsening Sino-Soviet relations saw the USSR stirring up nationalist sentiments.

The end of the Cultural Revolution and rise of Deng Xiaoping led to a loosening of restrictions. The representation of Kazakhs rebounded, especially with the return of purged political leaders and Kazakhs who fled the country. The collectivisation policies were also rolled back, but ethnic tensions between Kazakh and Han persist.

But, there were limitations to the loosening of restrictions. The 1990s saw a wave of popular unrest and terrorist attacks that led to the Chinese Government instituting the Strike Hard campaign aimed at suppressing separatism and restoring security. This and the political climate after 9/11 led to a change in policy away from cultural assimilation to securitization, as the Chinese state increasingly cracked down on separatists and Islamist terrorists.

In 1984, 1,175 Kazakhs from Qinghai returned to Xinjiang with state support.

In 1991, after the dissolution of the Soviet Union and Kazakhstan's independence, Kazakhstan encouraged overseas Kazakhs to return. According to estimates, over 106,000 Chinese Kazakhs migrated to Kazakhstan between 1991 and 2011.

Amnesty International condemned the charges against 19 Atajurt activists in Kazakhstan, urging their release. The activists face up to 10 years in prison for a peaceful protest calling for the release of a detained Kazakhstani citizen in China. Amnesty criticized the misuse of "incitement of hatred" charges to suppress dissent. Atajurt, a human rights group, has been targeted since 2019 for documenting abuses against ethnic Kazakhs in China.

== Distribution ==
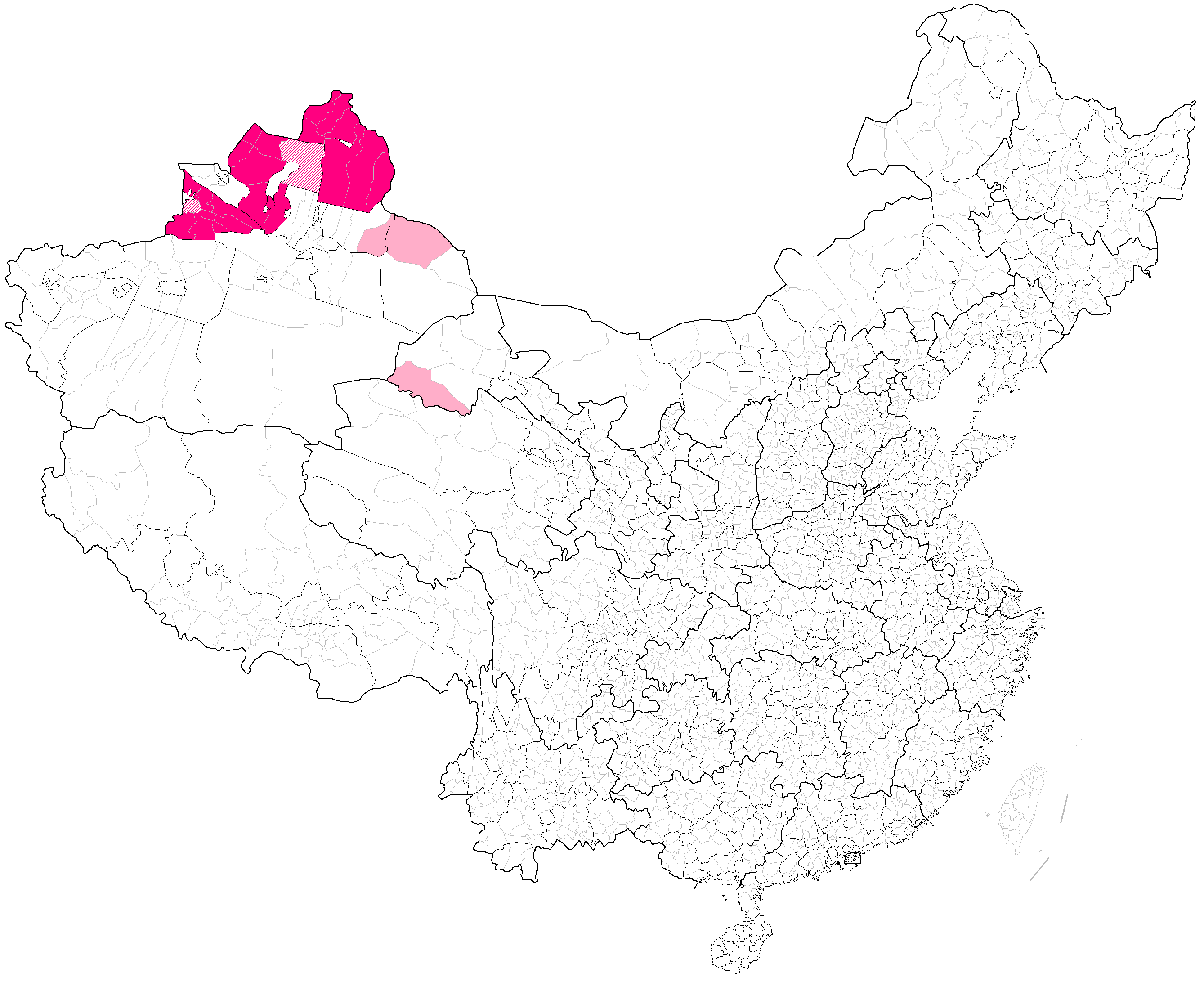
Kazakh autonomous prefectures and counties in China

=== By county ===
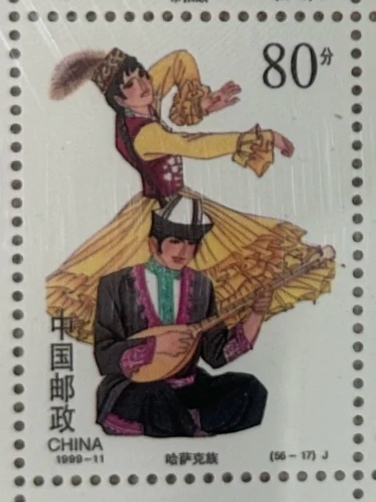
Kazakh people on Chinese postage stamps commemorating the 50th anniversary of China in 1999

(Only includes counties or county-equivalents containing >1% of county population.)

County-level distribution of Kazakhs (2000)
Сounty/City	% Kazakh	Kazakh pop	Total pop
Xinjiang Uyghur Autonomous Region	6.74	1,245,023	18,459,511
Aksay Kazakh Autonomous County	30.5	2,712	8,891
Ürümqi City	2.34	48,772	2,081,834
Tianshan district, Ürümqi	1.77	8,354	471,432
Saybag district, Ürümqi	1.27	6,135	482,235
Xinshi district, Ürümqi	1.06	4,005	379,220
Dongshan district, Ürümqi	1.96	1,979	100,796
Ürümqi County	8.00	26,278	328,536
Karamay City	3.67	9,919	270,232
Dushanzi district	4.24	2,150	50,732
Karamay district	3.49	5,079	145,452
Baijiantan district	3.35	2,151	64,297
Orku district	5.53	539	9,751
Hami City	8.76	43,104	492,096
Yizhou district	2.71	10,546	388,714
Barkol Kazakh Autonomous County	34.01	29,236	85,964
Yiwu county	19.07	3,322	17,418
Changji Hui Autonomous Prefecture	7.98	119,942	1,503,097
Changji City	4.37	16,919	387,169
Fukang City	7.83	11,984	152,965
Midong district	1.94	3,515	180,952
Hutubi County	10.03	21,118	210,643
Manas County	9.62	16,410	170,533
Qitai County	10.07	20,629	204,796
Jimsar County	8.06	9,501	117,867
Mori Kazakh Autonomous County	25.41	19,866	78,172
Bortala Mongol Autonomous Prefecture	9.14	38,744	424,040
Bole City	7.10	15,955	224,869
Jinghe County	8.27	11,048	133,530
Wenquan County	17.89	11,741	65,641
Ili Kazakh Autonomous Prefecture	1.78	5,077	285,299
Kuytun City	1.78	5,077	285,299
Ili Prefecture direct-controlled territories	22.55	469,634	2,082,577
Ghulja City	4.81	17,205	357,519
Ghulja County	10.30	39,745	385,829
Qapqal Xibe Autonomous County	20.00	32,363	161,834
Huocheng County	7.96	26,519	333,013
Gongliu County	29.69	45,450	153,100
Xinyuan County	43.43	117,195	269,842
Zhaosu County	48.43	70,242	145,027
Tekes County	42.25	56,571	133,900
Nilka County	45.15	64,344	142,513
Tacheng Prefecture	24.21	216,020	892,397
Tacheng City	15.51	23,144	149,210
Usu City	9.93	18,907	190,359
Emin County	33.42	59,586	178,309
Shawan County	16.23	30,621	188,715
Toli County	68.98	55,102	79,882
Yumin County	32.42	15,609	48,147
Hoboksar Mongol Autonomous County	22.59	13,051	57,775
Altay Prefecture	51.38	288,612	561,667
Altay City	36.80	65,693	178,510
Burqin County	57.31	35,324	61,633
Koktokay County	69.68	56,433	80,986
Burultokay County	31.86	24,793	77,830
Kaba County	59.79	43,889	73,403
Qinggil County	75.61	40,709	53,843
Jeminay County	61.39	21,771	35,462

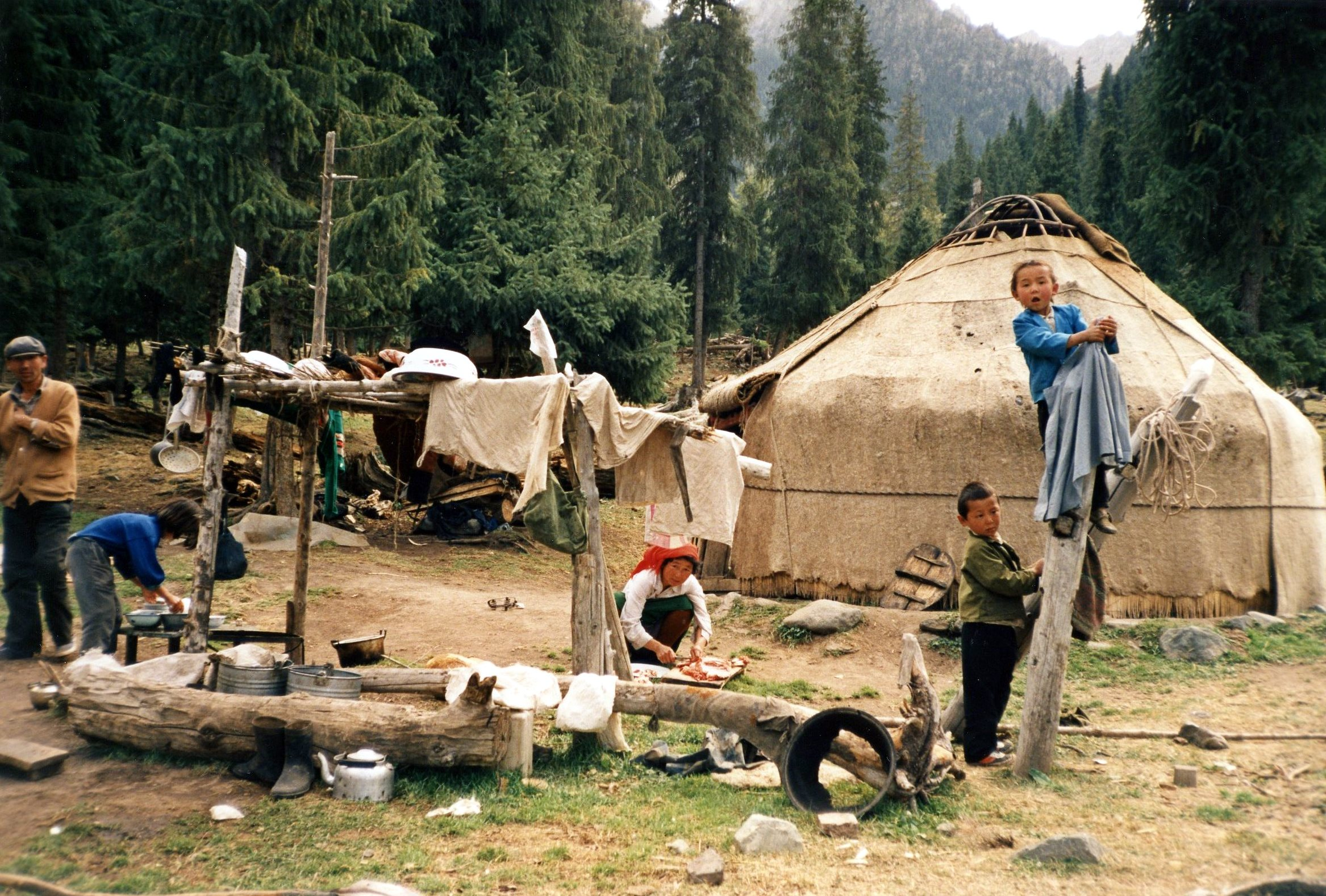
Kazakh people in Xinjiang, China

== Language and culture ==
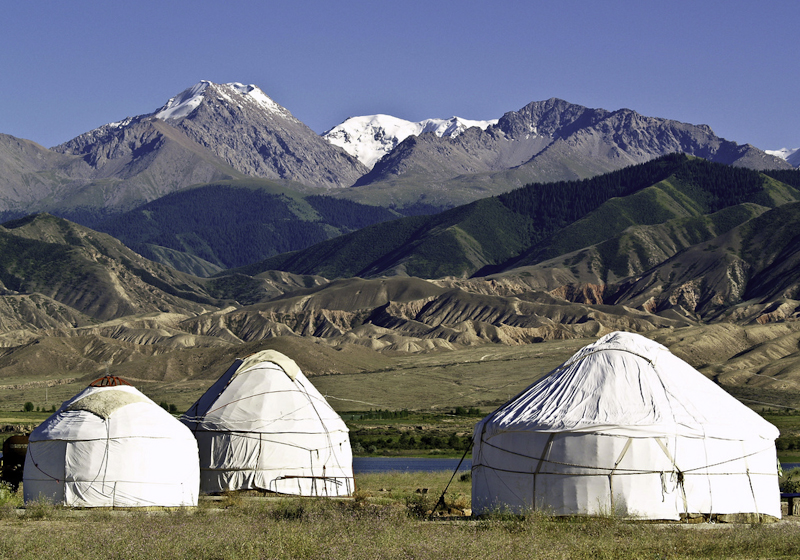
Kazakh yurts

The Kazakh population in China has a distinct culture, mostly based on a series of genealogical records that in addition to stipulating lineage, keep the traditional ways of life alive. Some Kazakhs are nomadic herders and raise sheep, goats, cattle, and horses. These nomadic Kazakhs migrate seasonally in search of pasture for their animals. During the summer the Kazakhs live in yurts, while in winter they settle and live in modest houses made of adobe or cement blocks. Others live in urban areas and tend to be highly educated and hold much influence in integrated communities. The Islam practiced by the Kazakhs in China contains many elements of shamanism, ancestor worship, and other traditional beliefs and practices.

Kazakh is still spoken in the community, although unlike other Kazakh varieties it takes influences from Mandarin and is written in the Arabic script. Chinese Kazakhs almost always speak Uyghur or Mandarin in addition, both of which are used for interethnic communication. Thus, Kazakh remains important but is seldom spoken outside the home, with the exception of Kazakh-majority areas. Many Kazakhs feel ethnically distinct from other groups in Xinjiang and connected to Kazakhs across the border in Kazakhstan. However, the rollback of Kazakh-medium education and the Russification of post-Soviet Kazakhs across the border means this feeling is not quite universal.

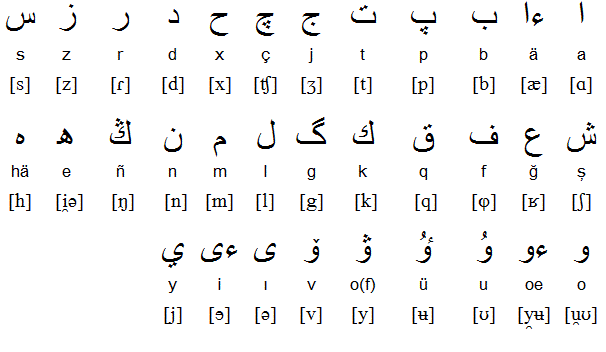
Kazakh Arabic alphabet, used in China

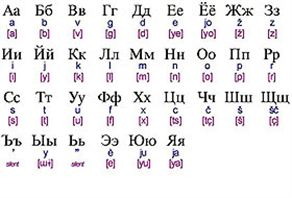
Kazakh Cyrillic alphabet, used in Kazakhstan

== Religious beliefs ==
Historically, the Kazakh people practiced early forms of totemism, worshipping objects such as the sun, fire, eagles, and wolves. Their Turkic ancestors also practiced Shamanism and folk varieties of Zoroastrianism, Nestorian Christianity, and Buddhism. From the 8th century onward, some clans and tribes began to adopt Islam, and by the 16th century, Islam had largely become the dominant religion of the Kazakh people.

Due to constraints of production and lifestyle, as well as the influence of tribal systems and traditional customs, the spread of Islam among the Kazakhs was a long and gradual process. Kazakh Islam, like that of other Muslim ethnic groups in Xinjiang, developed distinctive local characteristics, including remnants of shamanistic beliefs and practices such as fire and sun worship. Influenced by Shamanism and other natural religions, the Kazakhs embraced a worldview of animism, worshipping the sun, moon, water, fire, and various nature deities. Kazakhs also worship the wolf, believing it to be a servant and messenger of Tengri. Overall, the level of Islamic observance among Kazakhs is relatively weaker compared to other Muslim ethnic groups. This is reflected in the small number of mosques, limited number of religious clergy, and low participation in formal religious activities in Kazakh-populated areas. However, Islam still has a significant influence on everyday life, particularly in marriage, funerals, and customs. Kazakhs generally follow Islamic rules and taboos in diet, burial practices, and other aspects of life.

The Kazakhs follow the Sunni Islam tradition and do not have a Sufi order (menhuan) system, and sectarian divisions are minimal. Mosques among Kazakhs are often small or absent and rarely endowed with waqf property. Due to their nomadic lifestyle, mosques are usually built on a tribal basis, and several tribes may share one mosque when populations are small. Some Kazakh funeral customs differ from Islamic prescriptions. For example, if a husband dies, his wife may wear a white mourning cloth and sing laments, and during burial ceremonies, family members often perform mourning songs. Kazakh inheritance customs also differ in certain respects from the prescriptions of the Qur’an.

== Notable people ==
- Osman Batur (1899–1951) – Kazakh chieftain who fought both for and against the Nationalist Chinese government in the 1940s and early 1950s
- Alen Zheniskhanuly (1889–1960) Kazakh nobleman
- Kadisha "Kaduan" Mamyrbekkyzy (1900–1963) – Kazakh politician who served in the Nationalist and Communist Chinese governments, wife of Alen Zheniskhanuly
- Dalelkhan Sugirbayev (1906–1949) – Kazakh chieftain who fought against the Nationalist Chinese government and sought to join the Chinese Communists in 1949
- Qazhyghumar Shabdanuly (Kazakh: Қажығұмар Шабданұлы; 1925–2011) – Kazakh Chinese political activist and author writing in Kazakh language. For more than forty years, Shabdanuly was imprisoned by the People's Republic of China for his political views.
- Ashat Kerimbay (Асхат Керімбай) – Chinese politician
- Mukhtar Kul-Mukhammed (Мұхтар Абрарұлы Құл-Мұхаммед) – politician and public figure of Kazakhstan; First Deputy Chairman of "Nur Otan" party
- Jänäbil Smağululı (Жәнәбіл Смағұлұлы) – Chinese politician
- Mayra Muhammad-kyzy (Kazakh: Maıra Muhamedqyzy; Maira Kerey) – opera singer. She was the first Kazakh at the Parisian Grand Opera, and is an Honored Artist of the Republic.
- Mamer – folk singer
- Rayzha Alimjan (Риза Әлімжан; رايزا ٴالىمجان) – Kazakh Chinese actress and model
- Xiakaini Aerchenghazi (Шакен Аршынғазы) – speed skater who competed in the 2018 Winter Olympics
- Rehanbai Talabuhan – speed skater who competed in the 2018 Winter Olympics
- Adake Ahenaer (Ақнар Адаққызы) – speed skater
- Yeljan Shinar (Елжан Шынар) – footballer currently playing as a defender for Shenzhen
- Yerjet Yerzat – Chinese footballer for Chongqing Dangdai Lifan FC
- Yeerlanbieke Katai (Ерланбек Кәтейұлы) – freestyle wrestler; bronze medals winner at the 2014 Asian Games, and competed in the 2016 Summer Olympics
- Zhumabek Tursyn – mixed martial arts fighter; he previously fought as a Bantamweight in the Ultimate Fighting Championship
- Kanat Islam – boxer who won bronze medals at the 2008 Summer Olympics, 2007 World Championships, and the 2006 Asian Games
- Yushan Nijiati – amateur boxer; bronze medal winner at the 2007 World Amateur Boxing Championships in the 91 kg division
- Tuohetaerbieke Tanglatihan (Тоқтарбек Танатхан) – amateur boxer; competed in the men's middleweight event at the 2020 Summer Olympics
- Walihan Sailike (Уалихан Сайлық) – Greco-Roman wrestler; bronze medal winner in the 60 kg event at the 2018 World Wrestling Championships, and bronze medal winner in the 2020 Summer Olympics
- Ahenaer Adake (Ақнар Адақ) – speed skater; competed in the women's 1,500 meters, 3,000 meters, and team pursuit events at the 2022 Winter Olympics
- Sayragul Sauytbay (Сайрагүл Сауытбай) – doctor, headteacher, political activist & whistleblower about the Xinjiang re-education camps

== See also ==
- Chinese people in Kazakhstan
- China–Kazakhstan relations
- Yi–Ta incident
- Kyrgyz in China
- Uzbeks in China
- Dungans
