= World Kurultai of Kazakhs =

International congress

World Kurultai of Kazakhs (Kazakh: Қазақтардың Дүниежүзілік құрылтайы) is an international congress bringing together representatives of the Kazakh diaspora and ethnic Kazakhs living in Kazakhstan. First held in 1992 following Kazakhstan's independence from the Soviet Union, the congress addresses issues relating to cultural identity, education, diaspora relations and the repatriation of ethnic Kazakhs to Kazakhstan.

The first congress led to the establishment of the World Association of Kazakhs, an organization intended to maintain cultural, educational and other ties with Kazakh communities abroad.

== History ==
=== Background and establishment ===
Following the dissolution of the Soviet Union and Kazakhstan's declaration of independence on 16 December 1991, the government began developing policies aimed at strengthening ties with ethnic Kazakhs living outside the country and facilitating their return to Kazakhstan.

On 31 December 1991, President Nursultan Nazarbayev delivered a radio address to Kazakhs living abroad, announcing the country's willingness to facilitate their repatriation. Preparations also began for an international congress of Kazakhs.

The first World Kurultai of Kazakhs took place in Almaty from 29 September to 3 October 1992. The gathering brought together representatives of Kazakh communities from countries including China, Mongolia, Turkey, Iran, Russia, Germany and the United States.

The congress discussed relations between Kazakhstan and the Kazakh diaspora, the preservation of the Kazakh language and culture abroad, and opportunities for ethnic Kazakhs to settle in Kazakhstan. During the gathering, the World Association of Kazakhs was established, with Nursultan Nazarbayev elected as its chairman.

=== Subsequent congresses ===
The second World Kurultai of Kazakhs was held in Turkistan in October 2002, ten years after the inaugural congress. The congress was attended by President of Kazakhstan Nursultan Nazarbayev. The Declaration on the National Revival of Kazakhstan was adopted at the congress. The participants also discussed a draft state programme entitled "Support for Compatriots Abroad" for 2003–2007.

The third congress took place in Astana in September 2005, bringing together more than 370 participants from over 30 countries.

The fourth congress was held in Astana in 2011. It was attended by approximately 660 delegates, including representatives of cultural, academic, business and public organizations.

The fifth World Kurultai took place in Astana from 22 to 25 June 2017. Its agenda included support for Kazakh cultural centres abroad, educational opportunities for young ethnic Kazakhs and measures to encourage repatriation. Representatives from more than 40 countries were invited to participate.

== Congresses ==
No.	Year	Host city
I	1992	Almaty
II	2002	Turkistan
III	2005	Astana
IV	2011	Astana
V	2017	Astana
