= Alen Zheniskhanuly =

Kazakh nobleman from Xinjiang (1889–1960)

Prince Alen Zheniskhanuly
- الەن جەڭىسحانۇلى; 艾林·精思汗
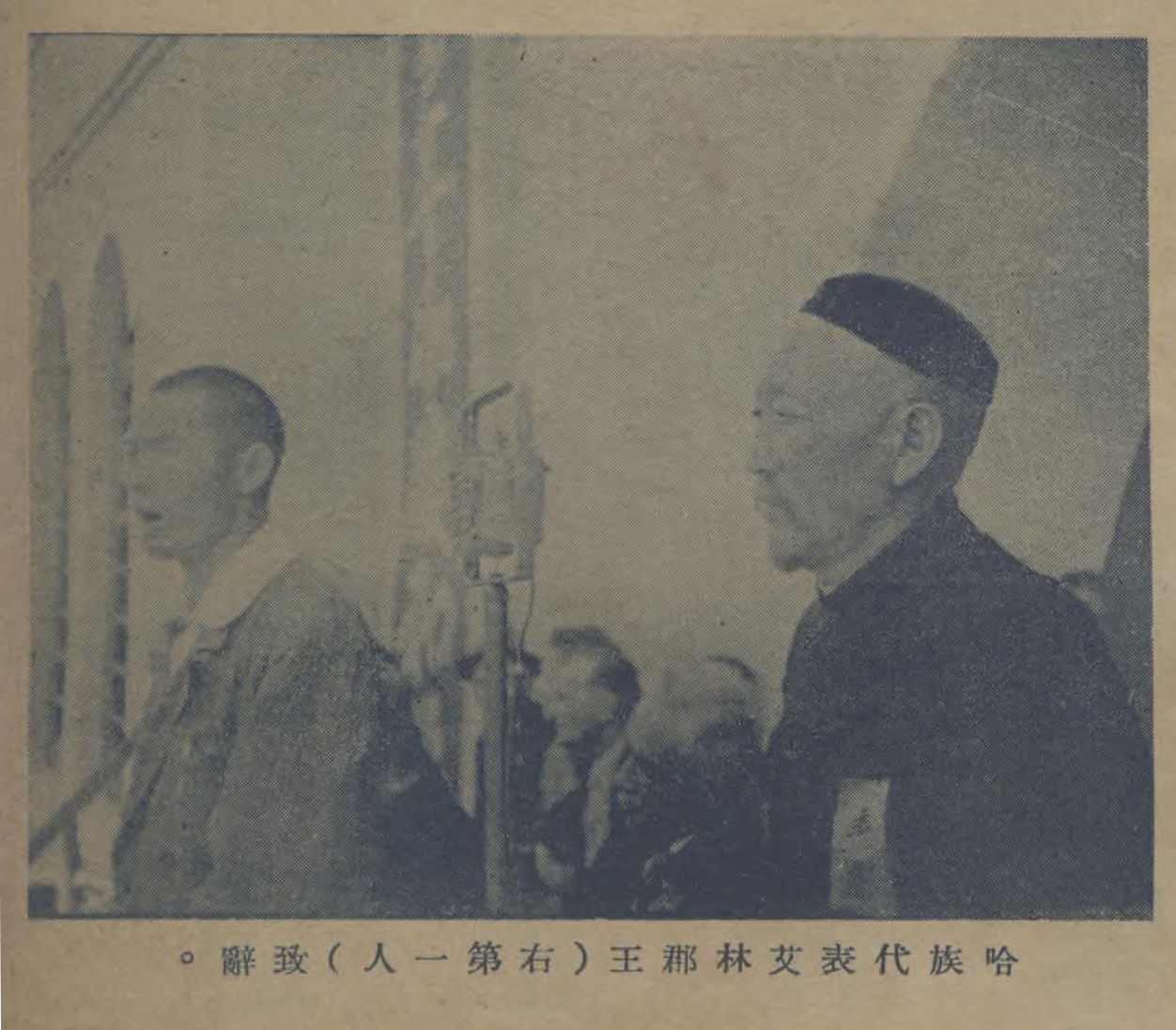
- Alen (right) speaking in Dihua (now Ürümqi) in 1947
- Born: 1889
- Died: 1960 (aged 70–71)
- Spouse: Kadisha "Kaduan" Mamyrbekkyzy (m. 1910)

Chinese name
- Chinese: 艾林·精思汗
Transcriptions
Standard Mandarin
- Hanyu Pinyin: Àilín Jīngsīhán

Alternative Chinese name
- Chinese: 艾林郡王
- Literal meaning: (Commandery) Prince Alen
Transcriptions
Standard Mandarin
- Hanyu Pinyin: Àilín Jùnwáng

Kazakh name
- Kazakh: الەن جەڭىسحانۇلى; Әлен Жеңісханұлы; Älen Jeñıskhanūly

Alen Zheniskhanuly (Note: Kazakh: الەن جەڭىسحانۇلى, romanized: Älen Jeñıskhanūly; Chinese: 艾林·精思汗; pinyin: Àilín Jīngsīhán) (1889–1960), known to the Chinese as Prince Alen, (Note: Chinese: 艾林郡王; pinyin: Àilín Jùnwáng) was a Kazakh nobleman from Jeminay in northern Xinjiang, China. He was a fourth-generation descendant of Kogedai Abilpeizuly.

As a child, he was educated at a local madrasa. In 1910, he married Kadisha "Kaduan" Mamyrbekkyzy, who became his personal advisor and translator. In 1912, the first president of China Yuan Shikai gave him the title Junwang (郡王), which means prince of a commandery. In 1933, Chinese warlord Sheng Shicai overthrew the provincial government in Dihua (present-day Ürümqi) and Alen became a member of the provisional government. Alen was supportive of Sheng's modern ideas and brought new tools and technology to rural Kazakh herders. Alen also benefited from trade with the Soviet Union, which backed Sheng. Sheng detained and imprisoned Alen in Dihua in 1937–38, but he was freed by the Kuomintang after Sheng was dismissed and exiled. In 1944, Alen was sent back to Altay Prefecture to win over the local Kazakh population during the Ili Rebellion.

In 1949, he participated in the incorporation of Xinjiang into the People's Republic of China and became an advisor to the Xinjiang Provincial People's Government.

Alen died in 1960.

== See also ==
- Kazakhs in China
