= Tolqyn Saqbaeva =

Kazakh artist

- Толқын Сақбаева
- Born: 1990 (age 35–36); Alma-Ata, Alma-Ata Oblast, Kazakh SSR, Soviet Union
- Education: Almaty College of Decorative and Applied Arts; Kazakh National Academy of Arts

Tolqyn Saqbaeva (Note: Often transliterated as Tolkyn Sakbayeva through a Russified Romanization of Толкын Сакбаева.) (Kazakh: Толқын Сақбаева; born 1990) is a Kazakh Spain-based painter. Born in Alma-Ata and residing in Madrid, she is an artist that mainly works with oil on canvas. The website Caravan.kz credited her as "one of the most original artists in Europe".

== Early life and education ==
Saqbaeva was born in 1990, in Alma-Ata. Before she is born, her parents are advised to abort the baby. At age four, Saqbaeva starts drawing.

In 2008, she enrolls in the Almaty College of Decorative and Applied Arts, joining Kenjebai Düisenbaev's crew. She was the college's only student with cerebral palsy.

In 2012, Saqbaeva joins the Kazakh National Academy of Arts. Having studied a year there, she was transferred to correspondence to Spain. There, she attends Guia Academy.

== Career ==
Since 2013, Saqbaeva lives in Spain. There, she faces less challenges with her cerebral palsy than in Kazakhstan.

Once in Barcelona during her studied in Spain, Saqbaeva becomes a permanent art resident of the "Espronceda" Institute of Arts. She has since become author of several exhibitions starting from 2019. Her first, titled Light of My Life, was made public in 2014 in Barcelona. It was covered in Spanish and Kazakh mass media. The second one, also in Spain, was called The Kaleidoscope, and took place in 2015. She also has many portraits, including self-portraits to her name.

In September 2019, she held her own art exhibition in Almaty, titled Teen Park, at the Esentai Gallery. This was the first public viewing of her art. In the drawings, teenagers of the park Parque del Buen Retiro, Madrid are illustrated. She is accompanied by Spanish artist Juan Saliquet at the event.

== Personal life ==
Saqbaeva has an older sister, Togjan, and a younger sister, Meruert. Meruert was the one accompanying Tolqyn in Spain. Saqbaeva has named Francisco Goya, Henri Matisse, Paul Cézanne, and Pablo Picasso as her favorite artists.
