= Kadisha Onalbayeva =

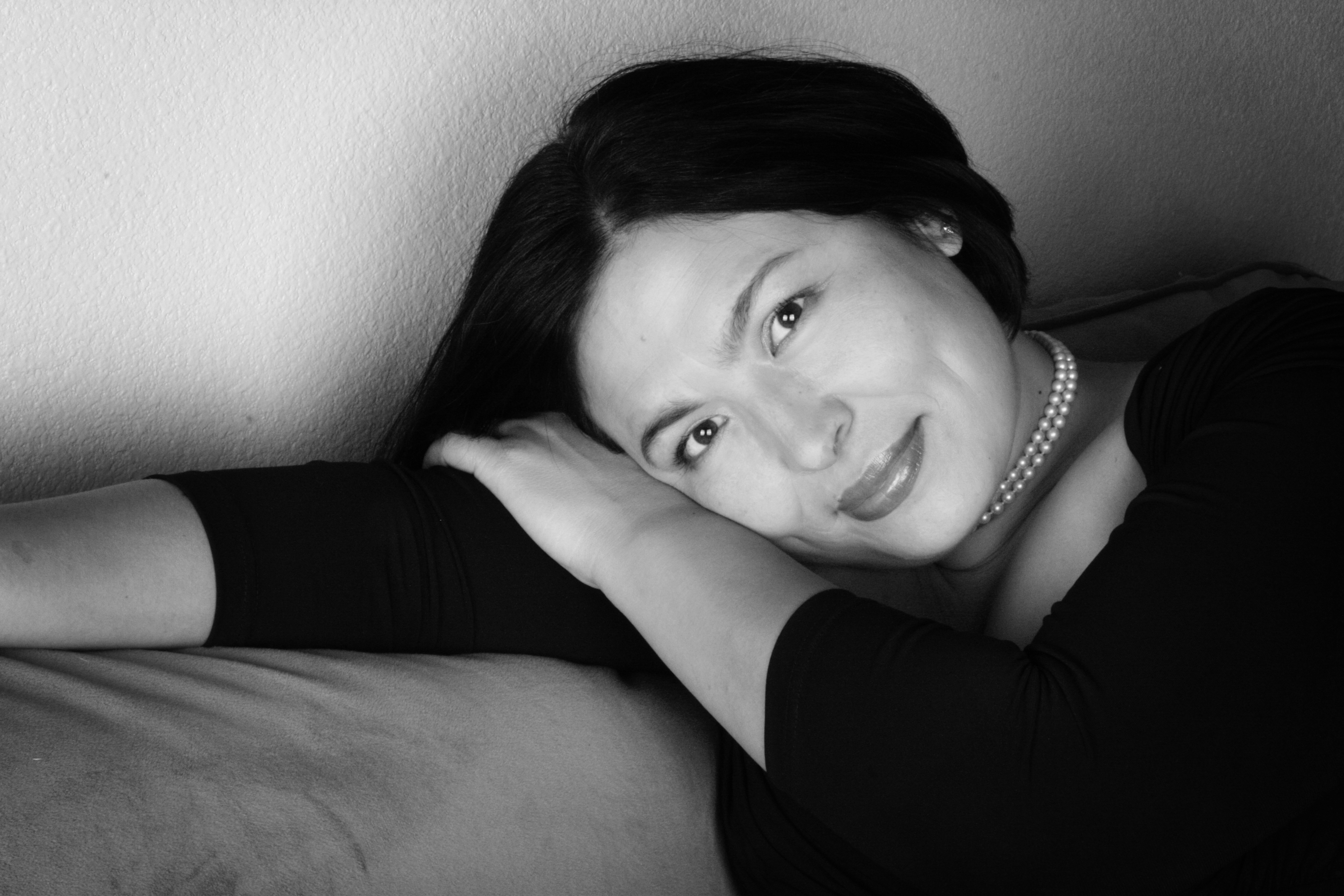
Kadisha Onalbayeva

Kadisha Onalbayeva (Kazakh: Hadısha Ońalbaeva, born 1972 in Zhetisay, Kazakhstan) is a pianist and composer.

== Early life and education ==
She began her musical training at age five, when she was recruited to attend the exclusive Zhubanov School for Talented Children in Almaty, Kazakhstan. While at the Zhubanov School, she excelled in piano and composition, garnering awards including prizes from the Soviet Union's New Talent competitions, Kazakhstan national piano competitions and other competitions and festivals in Central Asia, Germany, Turkey, Russia, and Uzbekistan. After graduating from the Zhubanov School, Kadisha entered the Kurmangazy National Conservatory of Music.

In 1988, Onalbayeva was presented the President's Award for Young Artists and Chevron Award for Talented Students in piano and composition. After immigrating to the United States in 2003, she earned dual M.M degrees in composition and piano performance at the University of New Orleans, Louisiana (2005, 2006), followed by a DMA in piano performance in 2010 from Louisiana State University in Baton Rouge, Louisiana.

== Career ==
Throughout her career, Onalbayeva has participated in festivals of new and classical music as composer, performer and festival organizer throughout Kazakhstan, Russia, Uzbekistan, Costa Rica, Austria, and England. She was commissioned by the Kazakhstan National Philharmonic Orchestra in 2013 to write a symphonic poem, which she titled Zherym (My Motherland). This new work premiered in May 2014 and was performed by the Kazakhstan National Philharmonic Orchestra. She has performed with the University of Mobile Orchestra, the Mobile Symphonic Band, the Pensacola Civic Band, the Albany Symphony Orchestra (Georgia), Kazakhstan National Philharmonic Orchestra as well as the Astana Philharmonic Orchestra. Chamber performances include collaborations with the Gaziza Zhubanova String Quartet in Kazakhstan, the Emerald Coast Trio, Gulf Coast Virtuosi, and violinist Emanuel Borok, among others. She is also an international piano performance adjudicator, clinician, and lecturer.

In 2013, Onalbayeva became Kazakhstan's first Steinway Artist. She currently serves on the faculty as Professor of Music at the University of Mobile, in addition to being President and Founder of the Gulf Coast Steinway Society.

The Ministry of Culture of the Republic of Kazakhstan recently filmed a full-length documentary on her life and musical career titled "Independent National’s Heritage." This video was released in 2015 in both Kazakh and Russian.

December 20, 2016, Onalbayeva recorded four works for Steinway’s Spirio recording project at Steinway Hall in New York, NY. In 2017, she chaired a successful “All Steinway” school effort for the University of Mobile, AL. The same year, she was awarded an Artist Fellowship Grant from the Alabama State Council on the Arts. On June 6, 2018 she performed a solo recital at Carnegie Hall. “Kadisha Onalbayeva maximizes the intricate fascination of each work with obvious familiarity and proficiency... sumptuous evocations of sorrow, longing, romance and elegance.” In 2019, she recorded “Ligeti Light” for solo piano by Lawrence Moss on a CD titled “New Dawn,” released through Innova. She received the “Glad Robinson Youse Adult Composer Award” in 2019 for her solo piano composition “Think...Together.” During this year, she also traveled to Kazakhstan where she performed at the Kazakh National Conservatory, conducted master classes, and judged in 5th International Professional Competition for Classical Vocalists. In 2020, Onalbayeva composed the theme song for an internationally-acclaimed documentary on the life of 1940’s Christian Dior muse, Alla Ilchun. This documentary is under consideration in Europe for a Golden Eagle award.

She lives in Mobile, AL and in Pensacola, FL with her composer-pianist husband, Michael Coleman. She has one daughter, Malika and a granddaughter, Dorothy Kadisha.
