= Kazakh diaspora =

Kazakh peoples living in other countries

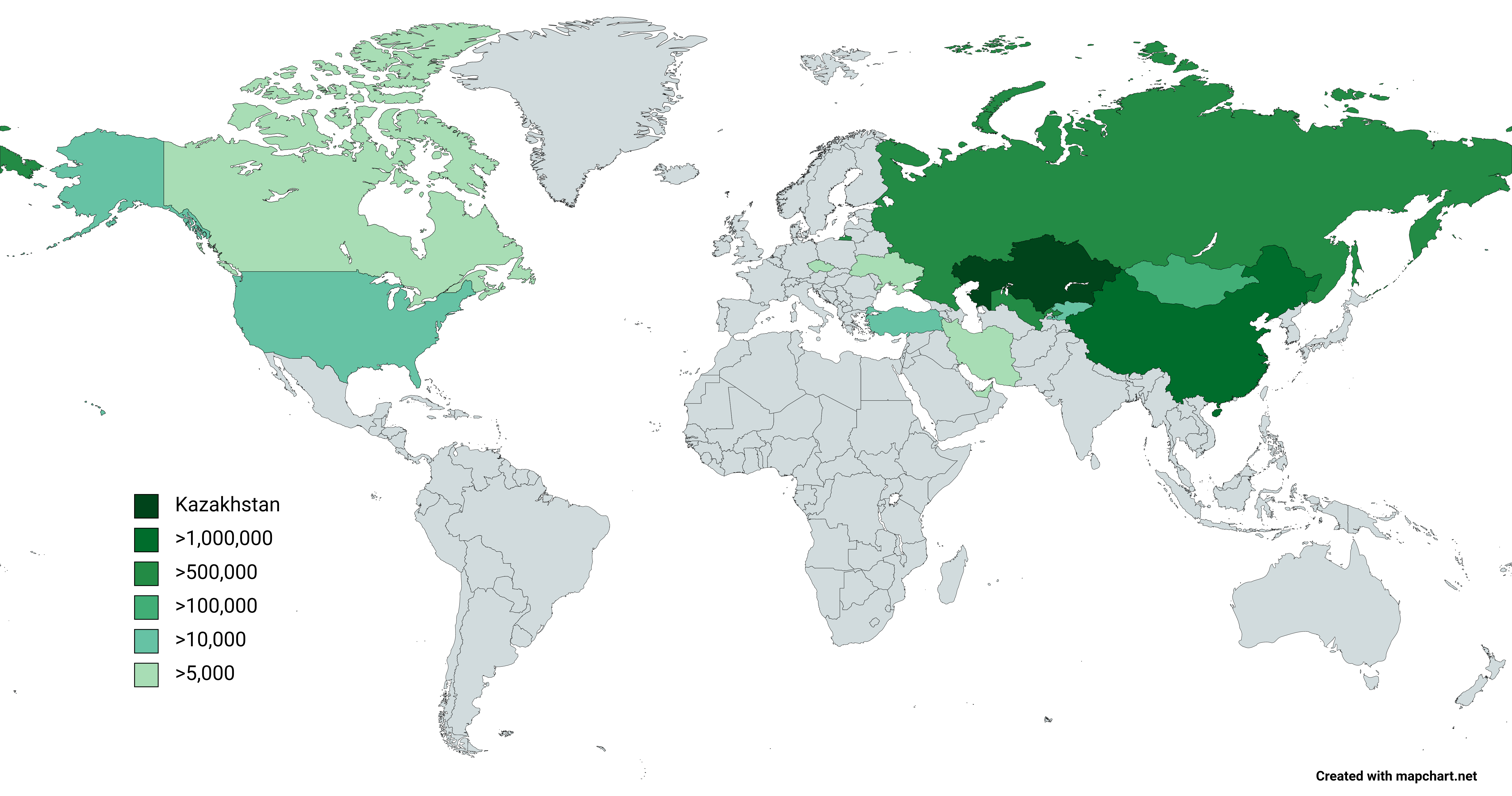
Kazakh diaspora in the world

Kazakh diaspora (Kazakh: Қазақтар диаспорасы, romanized: Qazaqtar diasporasy) is a term used to collectively to describe the ethnic or people of Kazakh descent who reside in outside of Kazakhstan across the world in various countries as a result of annexed territories and diasporic migration in the late 19th and early 20th centuries. It is estimated that more than four million Kazakhs live abroad. Although the Kazakh diaspora is usually a sparse one, particularly in Western Europe and United States, it retains ethnic enclaves within the countries of Turkey, Iran, and Afghanistan.

The Kazakh diaspora originates from forced migrations which originally began since the foundation of the Kazakh Khanate and its national identity of Kazakhs beginning in the 15th century. During that time, a series of Kazakh exodus took place in result of conflicts and wars that took place in the territory of Kazakhstan to neighbouring territories. However, it wasn't until in the beginning of the 20th century where a modern Kazakh diaspora began forming as by that time, Kazakhstan was under control of the Russian Empire and later eventually the Soviet Union where larger waves of migration, with most notably being China, occurred in result of Central Asian revolt of 1916 and the Kazakh famine of 1930–1933. Since 1960s, the Kazakh migration has been viewed to be more voluntary with Turkey, Western Europe, and the United States being primary spots of emigration and following the dissolution of the Soviet Union in 1991, a new massive departure occurred from Kazakhstan, although most of the emigrees being overwhelmingly Russians, Germans, and Ukrainians when taking to account of Kazakhstan's large multiethnic population in which the latter groups have been interchangeably classified as Kazakh emigrants.

== Classification and causes ==
In general, there are three possible causes for the emergence of the Kazakh diaspora in which are highlighted:

- Political:
  - In the Russian Empire and the Soviet Union: the Central Asian revolt of 1916, Russian Civil War, the Kazakh famines of 1919–1922 and 1930–1933, and Operation Barbarossa during World War II.
  - In the Republic of China: the Kazakh exodus from Xinjiang.
- Economical: the destruction of the Nomadic pastoralism after the Russian conquest of Central Asia and during the Soviet policies of Collectivization, labour immigration to Western Europe and the United States in the second half of the 20th century.
- Religious: the difficulty or complete impossibility of making a Hajj.

The Kazakh diaspora was formed on the basis of infection in several countries: first from Kazakhstan to China, then, including to the countries of Central Asia, Iran and Afghanistan, and eventually the rest of the world following the second half of the 20th century. The conservative minded older generation of the Kazakh diaspora is considered to be less welcome towards interethnic marriages, with the exception for marriages only being with other Turkic peoples.

== History ==
The instances of Kazakh migration dates back to 1723, when during the Kazakh–Dzungar Wars, various Kazakh villages were pillaged and attacked by the Dzungars, resulting in many civilian deaths. As a result, the remaining surviving Kazakh tribes were forced to flee their homes and settle in the Khanate of Bukhara, Khanate of Khiva and Badakhshan, an event that become known as the Aqtaban Shubirindi (Great Retreat). In the 18–19th centuries, as the Kazakh Khanate was in the process of being absorbed by the Russian Empire, several failed uprisings took places by the Kazakhs against the Tsarist government's policies in auctioning fertile land to the ethnic Russians which led to another migration to China, Bukhara, Khiva, Afghanistan, and Persia.

It wasn't until in the beginning of the 20th century when the Kazakh diaspora began developing with the Central Asian revolt of 1916 over the Tsarist government's policies in conscripting Kazakhs along with other Central Asian peoples for labour battalions in World War I. The armed revolt eventually led to the massacre of several hundred thousand Kazakhs and caused a mass exodus through Tian Shan of 300,000 Kazakhs and Kyrgyz to neighbouring China. After the Bolsheviks established control of Kazakhstan following the Russian Civil War, many Kazakhs had also emigrated towards South and East with the countries being Afghanistan, Iran, China, as well as abroad in Turkey and France.

Under Joseph Stalin's enactment of the first five-year plan in 1928, a policy which formed collectivization in Kazakhstan, resulted in nomadic Kazakhs to be forcefully settled in collective farms that led to the decline of livestock populations due to a lack of adequate grazing, mandatory confiscations, and slaughtering to fulfill required grain quotas. As a result of the consequences, it eventually led to the Kazakh famine of 1930–1933, a catastrophic event which caused massive deaths of approximately 1.5 million people from starvation with the majority victims being ethnic Kazakhs. An estimated 665,000 to 1.1 million Kazakhs, risking punishment, fled to China, Mongolia, Afghanistan, Iran, and the Soviet republics of Uzbekistan, Kyrgyzstan, Turkmenistan, Tajikistan, and Russia in search for food and work.

Following German invasion of the Soviet Union during World War II in 1941, various Kazakhs serving in the ranks of Red Army subsequently became captured POWs where they were transferred to internment camps within German occupied territories served within Turkestan Legion or joined the French Resistance. After the defeat of Nazi Germany in 1941, majority of Kazakhs captured by the Allies were sent back to the Soviet Union while others who refused to return eventually settled in the Western Bloc nations such as Turkey and the United States.

In Xinjiang Province under the Republic of China where an estimated half million Kazakhs lived since beginning with the defeat and collapse of the Dzungar Khanate in the 18th century, experienced an exodus of Kazakhs beginning in the 1930s due to provincial governor Sheng Shicai's anti-Turkist purges which sought to populate the region with ethnic Han Chinese people. A second wave of Kazakh migration from Xinjiang occurred following the incorporation of the Second East Turkestan Republic to the People's Republic of China in 1949 with desired place for settlement being Pakistan and India.

A notable member of the Kazakh diaspora to move from Xinjiang to Turkey and later Germany was Hasan Oraltay.

== Central Asia ==
=== Uzbekistan ===
As of the beginning of 2021, more than 821,000 ethnic Kazakhs lived in Uzbekistan. They live mostly in Karakalpakstan and northern Uzbekistan.

== East Asia ==
=== China ===
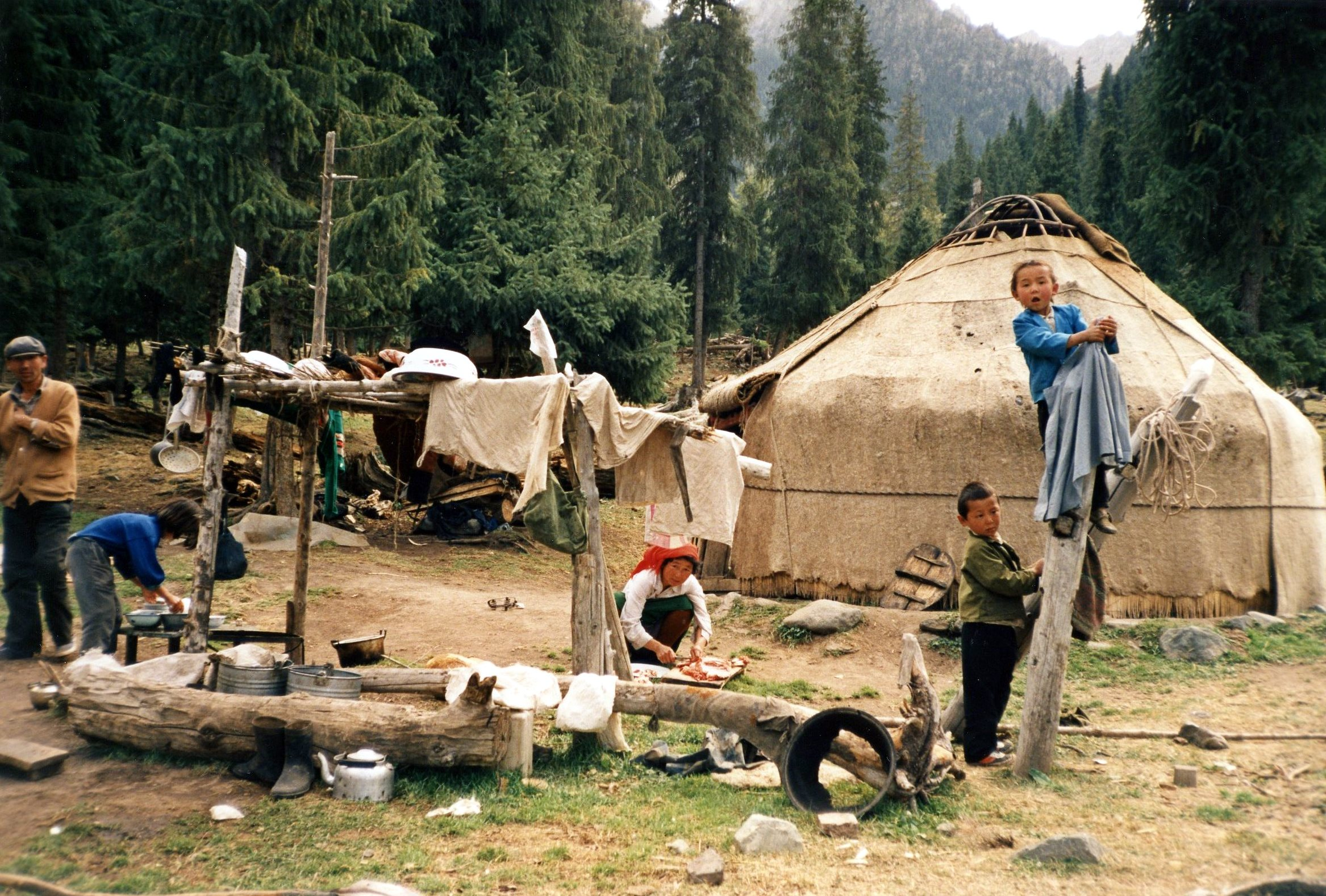
Kazakhs in Xinjiang, China, 1987

Kazakhs migrated into Dzungaria in the 18th century after the Dzungar genocide resulted in the native Buddhist Dzungar Oirat population being massacred.

Kazakhs, called "哈萨克族" in Chinese (pinyin: Hāsàkè Zú; lit. 'Kazakh nationality') are among 56 ethnic groups officially recognized by the People's Republic of China. According to the census data of 2020, Kazakhs had a population of 1,562,518, ranking 18th among all ethnic groups in China. Thousands of Kazakhs fled to China during the 1932–1933 famine in Kazakhstan.

In 1936, after Sheng Shicai expelled 30,000 Kazakhs from Xinjiang to Qinghai, Hui led by General Ma Bufang massacred their fellow Muslim Kazakhs, until there were 135 of them left.

From Northern Xinjiang, over 7,000 Kazakhs fled to the Tibetan-Qinghai plateau region via Gansu and were wreaking massive havoc so Ma Bufang solved the problem by relegating Kazakhs to designated pastureland in Qinghai, but Hui, Tibetans, and Kazakhs in the region continued to clash against each other. Tibetans attacked and fought against the Kazakhs as they entered Tibet via Gansu and Qinghai. In northern Tibet, Kazakhs clashed with Tibetan soldiers, and the Kazakhs were sent to Ladakh. Tibetan troops robbed and killed Kazakhs 640 kilometres (400 miles) east of Lhasa at Chamdo when the Kazakhs were entering Tibet.

In 1934, 1935, and from 1936 to 1938, Qumil Elisqan led approximately 18,000 Kerey Kazakhs to migrate to Gansu, entering Gansu and Qinghai.

In China there is one Kazakh autonomous prefecture, the Ili Kazakh Autonomous Prefecture in the Xinjiang Uyghur Autonomous Region and three Kazakh autonomous counties: Aksai Kazakh Autonomous County in Gansu, Barkol Kazakh Autonomous County and Mori Kazakh Autonomous County in the Xinjiang Uyghur Autonomous Region.

At least one million Uyghurs, Kazakhs and other Muslims in Xinjiang have been detained in mass detention camps, termed "reeducation camps", aimed at changing the political thinking of detainees, their identities, and their religious beliefs. But authorities in China have defended that the detention centers were in fact vocational education & training centers set up to deradicalize radicalized residents against the "3 evil forces" of religious extremism, terrorism and separatism.

=== Mongolia ===
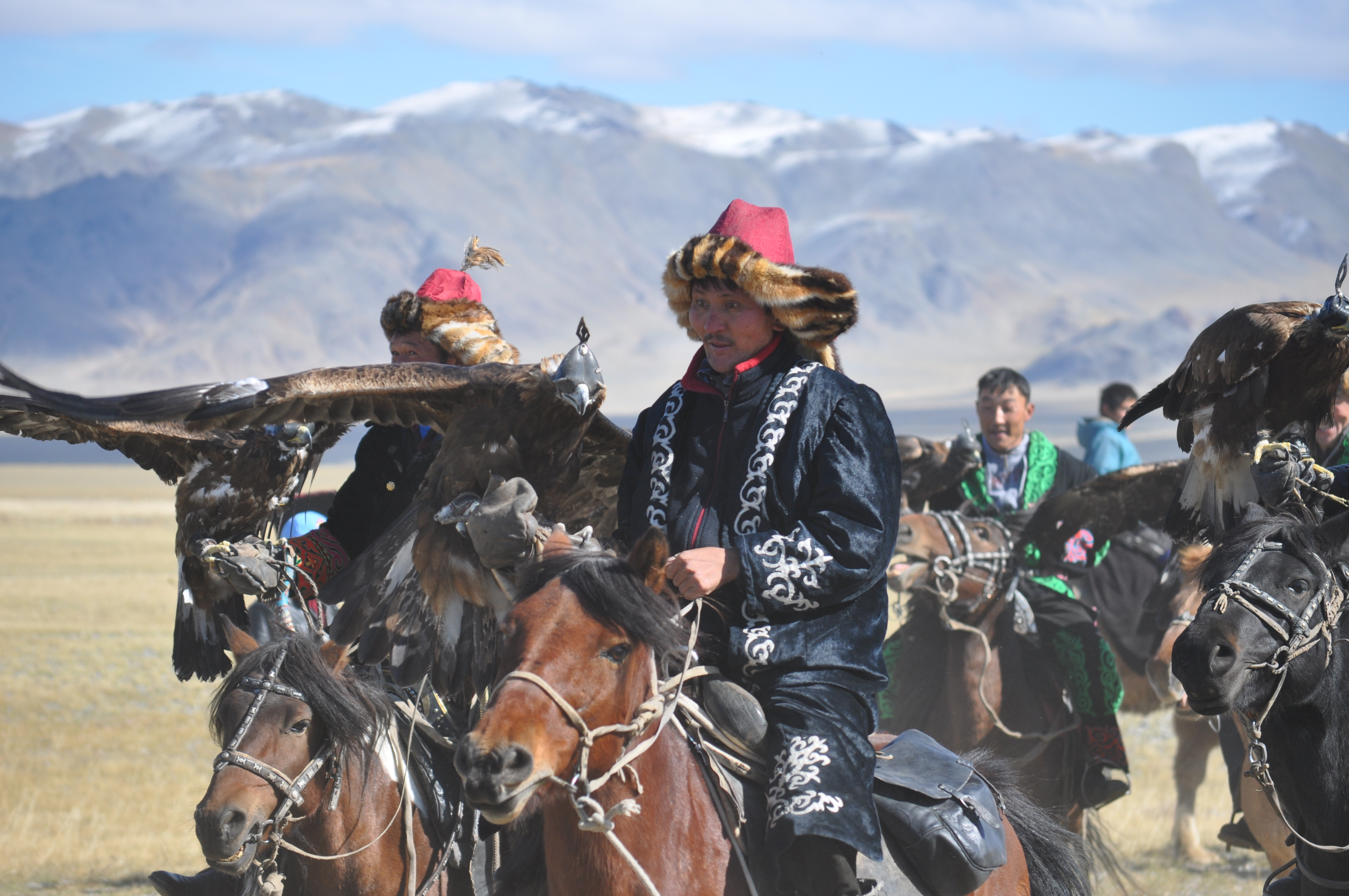
Kazakh hunters with eagles in Bayan-Ölgii Province, Mongolia

In the 19th century, the advance of the Russian Empire troops pushed Kazakhs to neighboring countries. In around 1860, part of the Middle Jüz Kazakhs came to Mongolia and were allowed to settle down in Bayan-Ölgii, Western Mongolia; for most of the 20th century they remained an isolated, tightly knit community. Ethnic Kazakhs (so-called Altaic Kazakhs or Altai-Kazakhs) live predominantly in Western Mongolia in Bayan-Ölgii Province (88.7% of the total population) and Khovd Province (11.5% of the total population, mostly in Khovd city, Khovd and Buyant sums). Additionally, a number of Kazakh communities can be found in various cities and towns spread throughout the country. Some of the major population centers with a significant Kazakh presence include Ulaanbaatar (90% in khoroo #4 of Nalaikh düüreg), Töv and Selenge provinces, Erdenet, Darkhan, Bulgan, Sharyngol (17.1% of population total) and Berkh cities.

Kazakhs face prejudice and discrimination in Mongolia. For example, Mongolian president Punsalmaagiin Ochirbat made remarks near the end of his term in 1997 about his intention to sterilise all Kazakhs in Mongolia if they refused to leave the country within 24 hours. His remarks were received negatively by the press and human rights organisations. The Office of the United Nations High Commissioner for Human Rights (OHCHR) has set frameworks to put an end to online discrimination of minorities as part of their programs in Mongolia, and in 2017 the OHCHR reported a temporary cessation of ethnic tensions. Fears over the reemergence of tensions have been raised due to funding cuts to the OHCHR's programs.

Ethnic Kazakhs of Mongolia national censuses data
1956	%	1963	%	1969	%	1979	%	1989	%	2000	%	2010	%	2020	%
36,729	4.34	47,735	4.69	62,812	5.29	84,305	5.48	120,506	6.06	102,983	4.35	101,526	3.69	120,999	3.81

== Russia ==
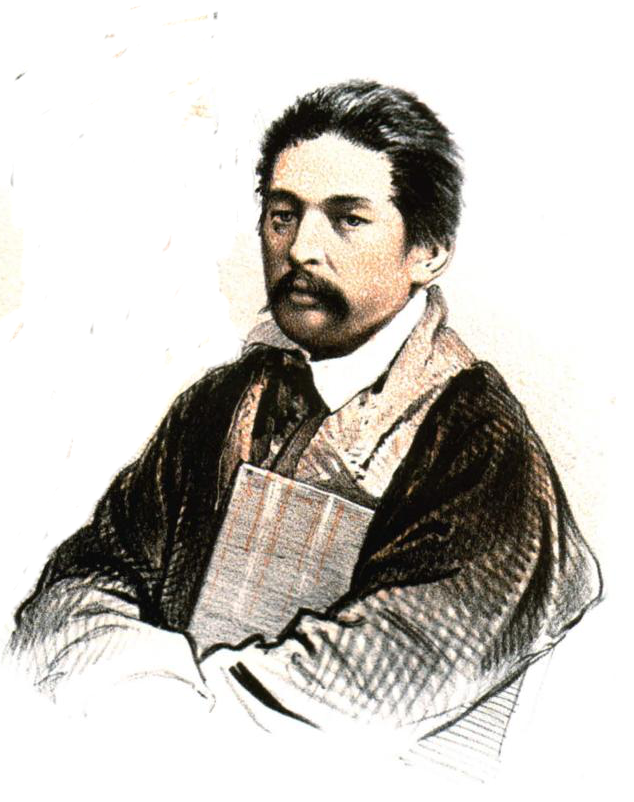
Muhammad Salyk Babazhanov – Kazakh anthropologist, a member of Russian Geographical Society.

According to the 2010 census, there were 647,000 Kazakhs living in the Russian Federation. However, according to the first deputy chairman of the World Association of Kazakhs, Kaldarbek Naimanbayev, who spoke in 2003, there were over 1 million ethnic Kazakhs living in Russia.

Most Russian Kazakhs live along the Russian-Kazakh border. The largest communities live in Astrakhan (149,415), Orenburg (120,262), Omsk (78,303), and Saratov Oblast (76,007). In a number of regions, there are several dozen schools where the Kazakh language is taught as a separate subject, however, secondary education in the Kazakh language is not available in Russia.

In Russia, the Kazakh population lives primarily in the regions bordering Kazakhstan. According to latest census (2002) there are 654,000 Kazakhs in Russia, most of whom are in the Astrakhan, Volgograd, Saratov, Samara, Orenburg, Chelyabinsk, Kurgan, Tyumen, Omsk, Novosibirsk, Altai Krai and Altai Republic regions. Though ethnically Kazakh, after the dissolution of the Soviet Union in 1991, those people acquired Russian citizenship.

Ethnic Kazakhs of Russia national censuses data
1939	%	1959	%	1970	%	1979	%	1989	%	2002	%	2010	%	2020	%^{1}
356 646	0.33	382 431	0.33	477 820	0.37	518 060	0.38	635 865	0.43	653 962	0.45	647 732	0.45	591 970	0.45
^{1}:of those who responded

== West Asia ==
=== Iran ===
During the Qajar period, Iran bought Kazakh slaves who were falsely masqueraded as Kalmyks by Khivan and Turkmen slave traders.

Kazakhs of the Aday tribe inhabited the border regions of the Russian Empire with Iran since the 18th century. The Kazakhs made up 20% of the population of the Trans-Caspian region according to the 1897 census. As a result of the Kazakhs' rebellion against the Russian Empire in 1870, a significant number of Kazakhs became refugees in Iran.

Iranian Kazakhs live mainly in Golestan Province in northern Iran. According to ethnologue.org, in 1982 there were 3000 Kazakhs living in the city of Gorgan. Since the fall of the Soviet Union, the number of Kazakhs in Iran decreased because of emigration to their historical motherland.

=== Afghanistan ===
Kazakhs fled to Afghanistan in the 1930s escaping Bolshevik persecution. Kazakh historian Gulnar Mendikulova cites that there were between 20,000 and 24,000 Kazakhs in Afghanistan as of 1978. Some assimilated locally and cannot speak the Kazakh language.

According to official figures, 13,000 ethnic Kazakhs from Afghanistan have immigrated to Kazakhstan since the early 1990s.

As of 2021, there are about 200 Kazakhs remaining in Afghanistan according to Kazakhstan's foreign ministry. Locals claim that many live in Kunduz and others in Takhar Province, Baghlan Province, Mazar-i-Sharif and Kabul.

Afghan Kypchaks are a group of Taymani Aimaqs who are of Kazakh origin. They mainly reside in Obe district to the east of the western Afghanistan's province of Herat, between the rivers Farāh Rud and Hari Rud.

=== Turkey ===
Turkey received refugees from among the Pakistan-based Kazakhs, Turkmen, Kirghiz, and Uzbeks numbering 3,800 originally from Afghanistan during the Soviet–Afghan War. Kayseri, Van, Amasya, Çiçekdağ, Gaziantep, Tokat, Urfa, and Serinyol received via Adana the Pakistan-based Kazakh, Turkmen, Kirghiz, and Uzbek refugees numbering 3,800 with UNHCR assistance.

In 1954 and 1969, Kazakhs migrated into Anatolia's Salihli, Develi and Altay regions. Turkey became home to refugee Kazakhs.

The Kazakh Turks Foundation (Kazak Türkleri Vakfı) is an organization of Kazakhs in Turkey.
