= Kaduan =

Kazakh politician from Xinjiang (1900–1963)

- قادۋان; 哈德萬
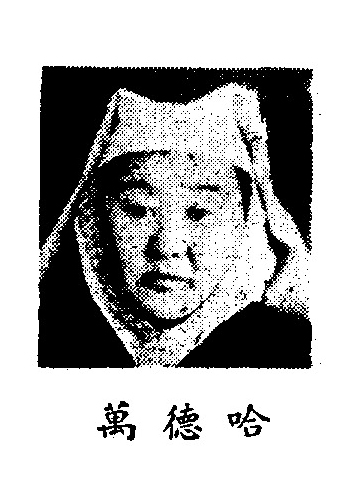

Commissioner of Dihua
- In office 1946–1951

Member of the National Constituent Assembly
- In office 15 November 1946 – 25 December 1946
- Constituency: Xinjiang Province

Personal details
- Born: Kadisha Mamyrbekkyzy; 1900 Toli County, Tarbagatay District, Xinjiang Province, Great Qing
- Died: 1963 (aged 62–63)
- Spouse: Alen Zheniskhanuly (m. 1910)

Military service
- Allegiance: Republic of China
- Years of service: 1946–1949
- Rank: Major General

Chinese name
- Traditional Chinese: 哈德萬
- Simplified Chinese: 哈德万
Transcriptions
Standard Mandarin
- Hanyu Pinyin: Hādéwàn

Birth name
- Traditional Chinese: 哈迪夏·馬穆爾別克
- Simplified Chinese: 哈迪夏·马穆尔别克
Transcriptions
Standard Mandarin
- Hanyu Pinyin: Hādíxià Mǎmù'ěrbiékè

Uyghur name
- Uyghur: قادىشا (قادۋان) مامىربەك قىزى
Transcriptions
- Latin Yëziqi: Qadisha (Qadwan) Mamirbek qizi

Russian name
- Russian: Кадиша (Кадуан) Мамырбековна
- Romanization: Kadisha (Kaduan) Mamyrbekovna

Kazakh name
- Kazakh: قادىشا (قادۋان) مامىربەكقىزى; Қадиша (Қадуан) Мамырбекқызы; Qadişa (Qaduan) Mamyrbekqyzy

Kadisha Mamyrbekkyzy (Note: Kazakh: قادىشا مامىربەكقىزى, romanized: Qadişa Mamyrbekqyzy; Chinese: 哈迪夏·馬穆爾別克; pinyin: Hādíxià Mǎmù'ěrbiékè) (1900–1963), better known mononymously as Kaduan, (Note: Kazakh: قادۋان, romanized: Qaduan; Chinese: 哈德萬; pinyin: Hādéwàn) was a Kazakh politician from Xinjiang who served in the local governments of the Republic of China (ROC) and then the People's Republic of China (PRC). She was the commissioner of Xinjiang's capital Dihua (present-day Ürümqi) from 1946 to 1951, under the ROC and PRC. She was a member of the Xinjiang delegation to the National Constituent Assembly of the ROC, and later became an advisor to the Xinjiang Provincial People's Government of the PRC. She held the rank of major general in the ROC's military.

Kaduan was married to Prince Alen Zheniskhanuly, leader of the Altay Kazakhs, and was his personal advisor and translator, as she was fluent in Chinese, Uyghur, and Russian. She also assisted her brother-in-law Sharipkhan Zheniskhanuly, who served in the local governments of the ROC as well. Before her political career she worked for the Kazakh Cultural Promotion Association and helped establish Kazakh-language schools in Altay.

== Early life ==
Kaduan was born in 1900 in Toli County, in what was then Tarbagatay District of Qing China's Xinjiang Province. She married Prince Alen Zheniskhanuly, leader of the Altay Kazakhs, in 1910. At the time, it was customary for Kazakh girls to be wed from the ages 10 to 13. She was highly educated and fluent in Chinese, Uyghur, and Russian in addition to her native Kazakh.

== Career ==
=== Republic of China ===
During Chinese warlord Sheng Shicai's rule over Xinjiang, Kaduan assisted her husband and her brother-in-law, Sharipkhan Zheniskhanuly, as an advisor and translator. Sharipkhan was the administrative and military head of the Altay District Government and the chairman of the Altay branch of the Xinjiang People's Anti-Imperialist Association. Kaduan also worked for the Kazakh Cultural Promotion Association and donated money and materials to establish Kazakh-language schools in Altay District.

During the Second Sino-Japanese War, Kaduan and her husband donated their livestock to feed Chinese soldiers on the frontlines. Sheng rewarded their patriotism by convincing them to move with their family to the provincial capital Dihua (present-day Ürümqi), where they were imprisoned in 1942. The Chinese government removed Sheng from his post in 1944, and his political prisoners, including Kaduan and Alen, were released. During the Turkic-led Ili Rebellion that started later that year, the Chinese authorities tasked Kaduan with "pacifying" Kazakh herders in the mountains of southern Dihua. Her job was to convince her Kazakh compatriots to oppose the rebellion and support the Chinese administration.

On 1 July 1946, the Coalition Government of Xinjiang Province was formed between the Turkic rebels and the Chinese authorities. For her efforts during the rebellion, the Chinese central government in Nanjing appointed her the commissioner of Dihua and head of the Dihua military garrison, with the rank of major general. During her tenure as commissioner of Dihua, she made great efforts to repatriate Kazakhs who had fled from the city during ethnic violence in the 1930s and 1940s.

Kaduan was one of the female members of the Xinjiang delegation to the National Constituent Assembly of the Republic of China, which met from 15 November to 25 December 1946 to draft a new constitution.

=== People's Republic of China ===
In 1949, she participated in the incorporation of Xinjiang into the People's Republic of China and retained her post as commissioner of Dihua. She later resigned in 1951 to become an advisor to the Xinjiang Provincial People's Government.

Kaduan died from a heart attack in 1963.

== Gallery ==
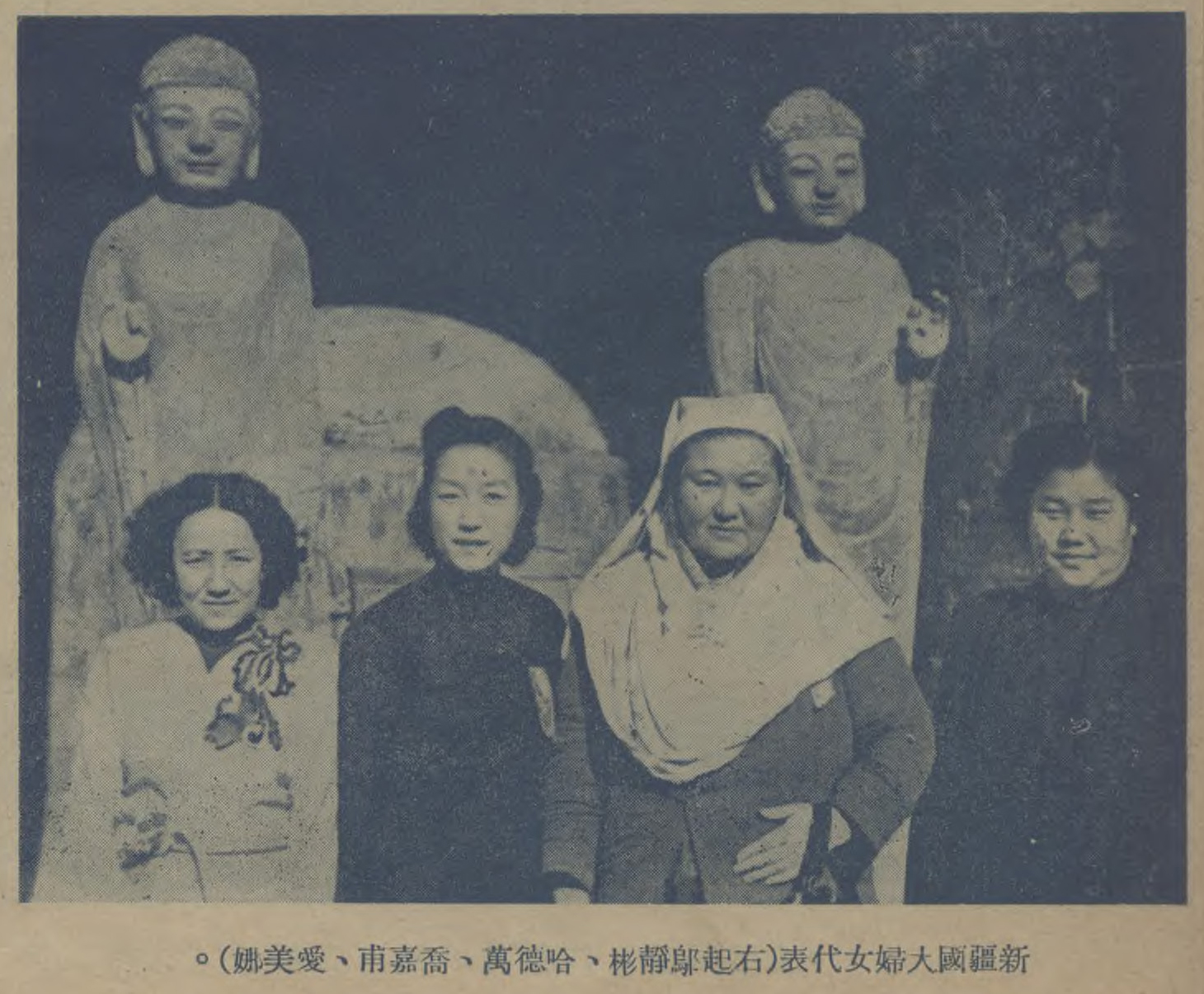
Kaduan with other female members of the Xinjiang delegation to the National Constituent Assembly, 1946

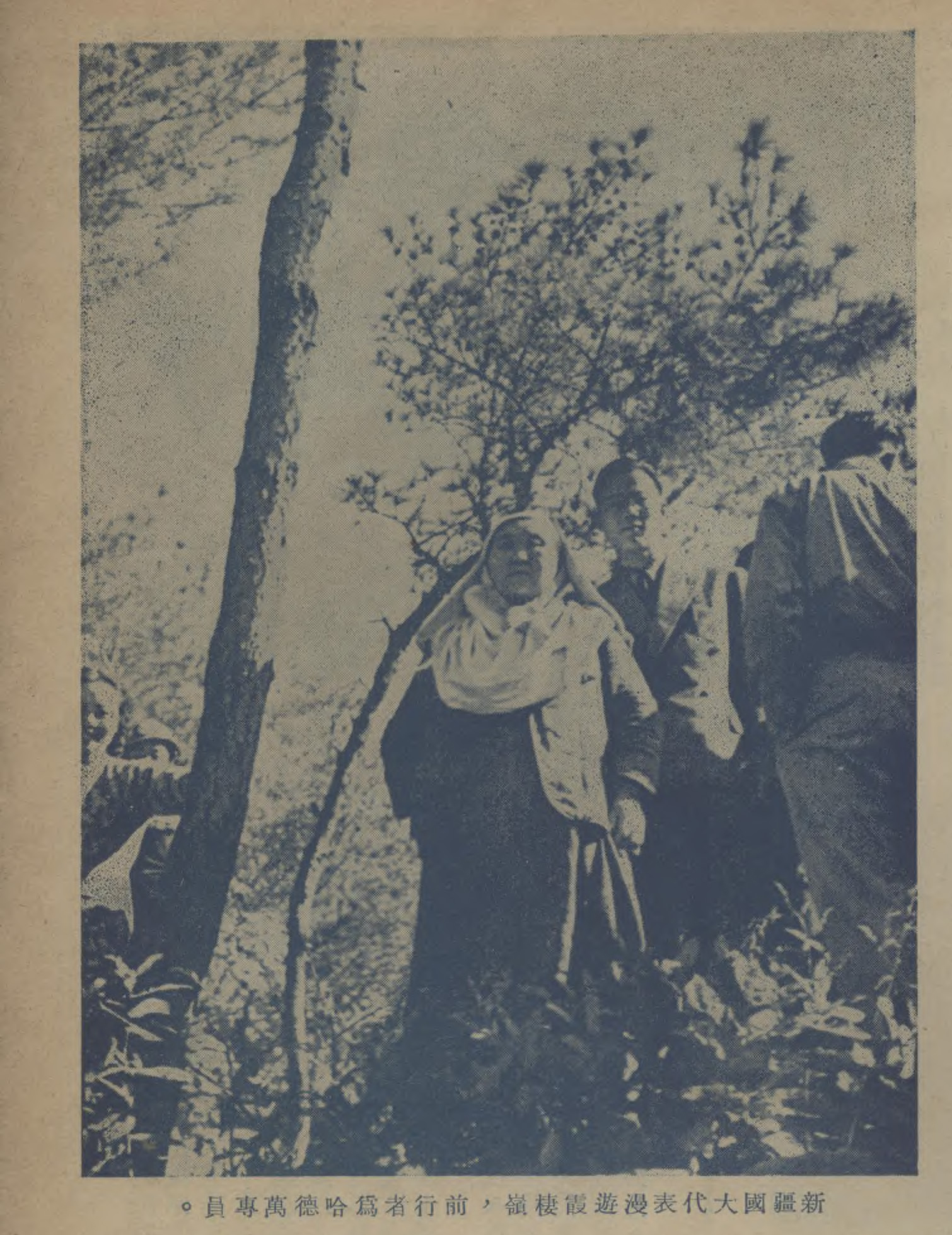
Kaduan with other Xinjiang delegates on a tour of Xiaqi ridge, 1947

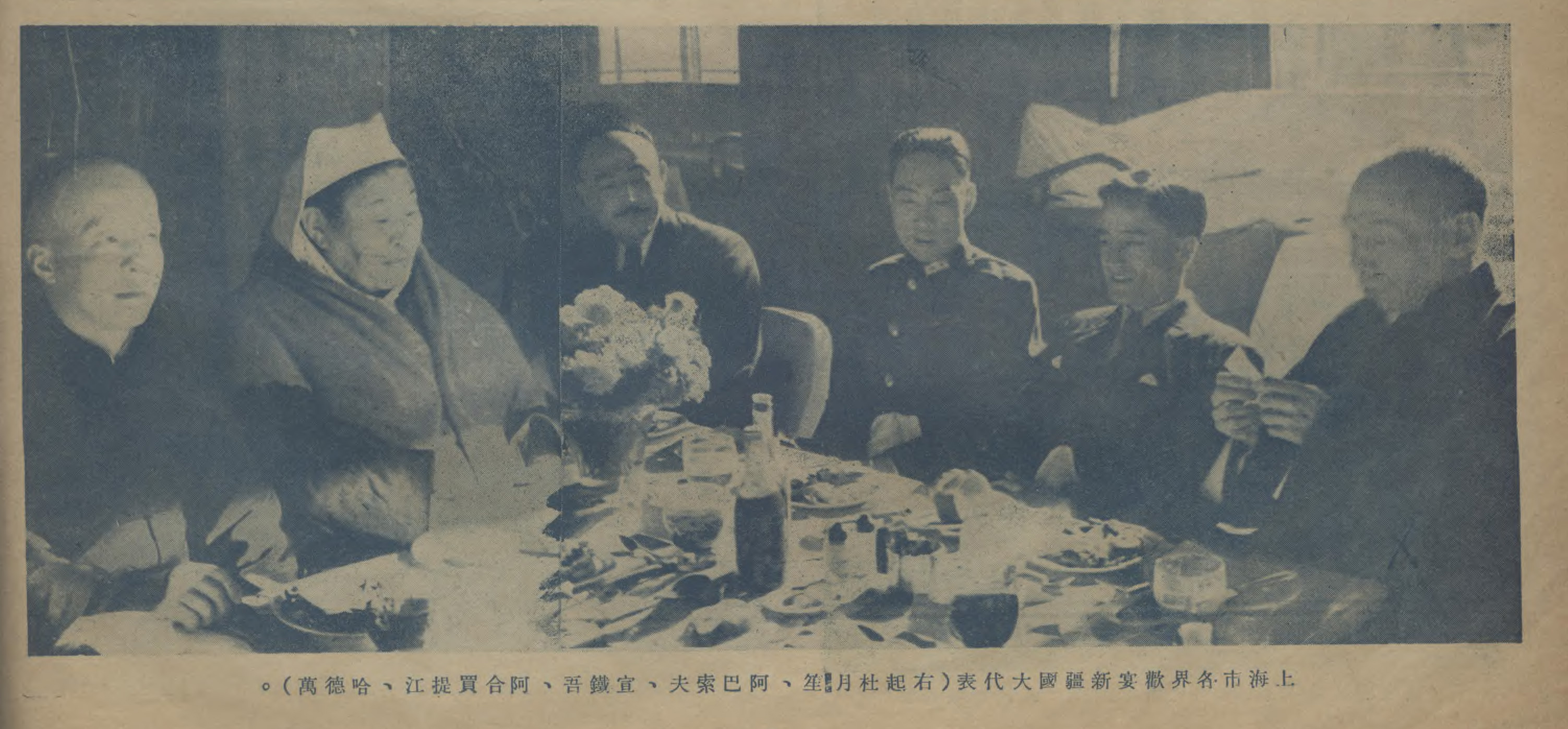
Kaduan with other Xinjiang delegates at a banquet in Shanghai, 1947

== See also ==
- Kazakhs in China
