= Börtala =

Bortala may refer to:

1. Bortala Mongol Autonomous Prefecture, a prefecture in Xinjiang, China
2. Bole, Xinjiang, a city in Bortala Mongol Autonomous Prefecture
3. Bortala River, the main affluent of the Aibi Lake
