= Hasan Oraltay =

Kazakh journalist

Hasan Oraltai
- Хасен Оралтай
- Born: 1933; Altay Prefecture, Xinjiang, China
- Died: 14 April 2010 (aged 76–77); Munich, Germany
- Other name: C. Kazakbalası
- Citizenship: Germany
- Spouse: Hatice Oraltay
- Children: 2

Hasan Oraltay (Kazakh: Хасен Оралтай, romanized: Hasen Oraltai; 1933 – 14 April 2010) was an ethnically Kazakh journalist, historian, and writer, best known for leading the Kazakh-language editorial office of Radio Free Europe for seven years. He was known by the alias C. Kazakbalası on his Turkish-language works.

== Early life and education ==
Oraltay was born in 1933 in the Altay Prefecture of Xinjiang, China. His exact date of birth is unknown. He is from the Jantekey family of the Kerey tribe.

From 1939 to 1941, he received traditional Islamic education from his uncle Adilbek Rahimbekoğlu, and Oraltay studied at the Sergazi School of Mollas of East Turkestan. He started modern pedagogical studies at the Sabit School of Pedagogical Sciences in 1944.

In 1946, in an attempt to escape the Kuomintang, Qalibek Häkim, his father, escapes through the Himalayas. From 1951 to 1954, the family lived in Kashmir. They settle in Salihli, Turkey in 1955. There, Oraltay starts his social and political activism.

== Career ==
From 1954 to 1967, Oraltay published newspapers, magazines, and books. Afterwards, in 1968, he was hired in Munich by Radio Free Europe. From 1988 to 1995, he led the Kazakh-language editorial office of the organization.

As historian, he researched the history of the Alash Autonomy and Kazakh nationalism in general. As writer, he wrote historical books. His first book, "On the Way to Liberty: Kazakh Turks of East Turkestan" (Kazakh: Еркіндік жолында: Шығыс Түркістан қазақ түркілері), was published in 1961. In 2006, he published his last book, "Elimay-Lap Ötken Ömirden".

== Death and legacy ==
On 15 October 2009, Oraltay was bedridden from cancer. On 14 April 2010, Oraltay died of an illness in Munich at age 77. He was survived by his widow Hatice Oraltay.

== Personal life ==
Oraltay had one daughter, Nūrkamal Pınär, fellow journalist and Radio Free Europe employee. She died on 7 January 2017 in Munich. She was to be buried in Turkey, where she grew up. He also had a son, Canibek Oraltay.

== Awards and honors ==
In 2007, Oraltay was awarded the wholenational "Altyn Samuryq" Award by Kazakhstan's Journalists Academy. He is also the recipient of the international "Alash" Award of the Writers' Union of Kazakhstan.
