= Mori Kazakh Autonomous County =

Mori County 木垒县 (Chinese) موري اۋدانى (Kazakh) مورى ناھىيىسى (Uyghur)
- Autonomous county
- Mori Kazak Autonomous County 木垒哈萨克自治县 مُ‌لُوِ خَاسَاکْ زِجِ‌ثِیًا; Мори Қазақ автономиялық ауданы موري قازاق اۆتونوميالىق اۋدانى مورى قازاق ئاپتونوم ناھىيىسى
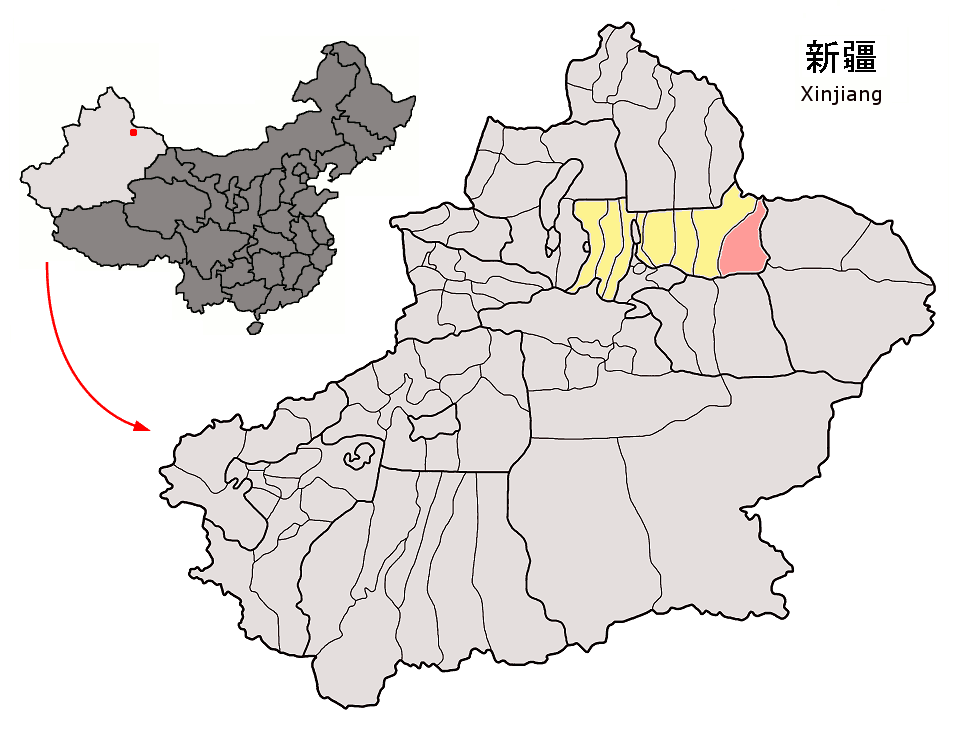
- Location of Mori Kazakh Autonomous County (pink) in Changji Prefecture (yellow) and Xinjiang (grey)

- Location within Dzungaria Location within Xinjiang Location within China
- Coordinates: 43.8167°N 90.2833°E
- Country: China
- Province: Xinjiang
- Prefecture: Changji
- County seat: Mori Town

Area
  - Total: 13,510.28 km^{2} (5,216.35 sq mi)

Population (2020)
  - Total: 67,256
  - Density: 4.9781/km^{2} (12.893/sq mi)
- Time zone: UTC+8 (China Standard (Note: Locals in Xinjiang frequently observe UTC+6 (Xinjiang Time), 2 hours behind Beijing.))
- Website: www.mlx.gov.cn

Mori Kazakh Autonomous County

Chinese name
- Simplified Chinese: 木垒哈萨克自治县
- Traditional Chinese: 木壘哈薩克自治縣
Transcriptions
Standard Mandarin
- Hanyu Pinyin: Mùlěi Hāsàkè zìzhìxiàn
other Mandarin
- Xiao'erjing: مُ‌لُوِ خَاسَاکْ زِجِ‌ثِیًا

Uyghur name
- Uyghur: مورى قازاق ئاپتونوم ناھىيىسى
Transcriptions
- Latin Yëziqi: Mori Qazaq Aptonom Nahiyisi
- Yengi Yeziⱪ: Mori Ⱪazaⱪ Aptonom Naⱨiyisi
- SASM/GNC: Mori Kazak Aptonom Nahiyisi
- Siril Yëziqi: Мори Қазақ Аптоном Наһийиси

Kazakh name
- Kazakh: موري قازاق اۆتونوميالى اۋدانى; Mori Qazaq avtonomialyq audany Мори Қазақ автономиялық ауданы

Mori Kazakh Autonomous County is a county within the Xinjiang Uyghur Autonomous Region and is under the administration of the Changji Hui Autonomous Prefecture. It contains an area of 13,510 km^{2}. According to the 2002 census, it has a resident population of 67,256.

== History ==
People have been active within the county's borders for over 3,000 years. In 60 BC (the second year of the Shenjue era of the Han Dynasty), the Han government established the Protectorate of the Western Regions, governing 36 kingdoms in the Western Regions. Mulei belonged to the Kingdom of Pulei. After unifying the Western Regions, the Tang government established Tingzhou in 640 AD (the fourteenth year of the Zhenguan era), with Pulei County under its jurisdiction. Mulei belonged to Pulei County and was under the jurisdiction of Tingzhou. In 713 AD (the first year of the Kaiyuan era of the Tang Dynasty), the Tang government established the Dushan Garrison in the present-day Mulei County.

In 1917, the Mulei River County was established and belonged to Qitai County. The following year, the construction of Mulei City began. In March 1930, Mulei County was established and separated from Qitai County, and named Mulei River County. In March 1954, Mulei River County was renamed Mulei County. In July of the same year, the Mulei Kazakh Autonomous Region was established. In March 1955, it was renamed Mulei Kazakh Autonomous County. In May 1958, it was transferred to Changji Hui Autonomous Prefecture.

== Population ==
At the end of 2020, according to the data from the Seventh National Population Census, the county's permanent resident population was 67,256.

Ethnic makeup of Mori Kazakh Autonomous County
Ethnicity	Percentage
Han	58.97%
Kazakhs	32.04%
Uyghur	6.42%
Uzbek	1.21%
Hui	1%
Others	0.36%

== Subdivisions ==
Mori County is made up of 4 towns, 6 townships, and 1 ethnic township.

Name	Simplified Chinese	Hanyu Pinyin	Uyghur (UEY)	Uyghur Latin (ULY)	Kazakh (Arabic script)	Kazakh (Cyrillic script)	Administrative division code
Towns
Mori Town	木垒镇	Mùlěi Zhèn	مورى بازىرى	Mori baziri	موري قالاشىعى		652328100
Xijir Town	西吉尔镇	Xījí'ěr Zhèn	شىجىر بازىرى	Shijir baziri	شيجير قالاشىعى		652328101
Dongcheng Town	东城镇	Dōngchéng Zhèn	دۇڭچېڭ بازىرى	Dungchëng baziri	دۇڭشىڭ قالاشىعى		652328102
Xinhu Town	新户镇	Xīnhù Zhèn	شىنخۇ بازىرى	Shinxu baziri	شينحۋ قالاشىعى		652328103
Townships
Yinggepu Township (Eginbulakh Township)	英格堡乡	Yīnggépù Xiāng	ئېگىنبۇلاق يېزىسى	Ëginbulaq yëzisi	ىنگىبۇلاق اۋىلى	Егінбұлақ	652328200
Zhaobishan Township	照壁山乡	Zhàobìshān Xiāng	قالقانتاغ يېزىسى	Qalqantagh yëzisi	قالقانتاۋ اۋىلى	Қалқантау	652328201
Qorin Township	雀仁乡	Qiāorén Xiāng	چۆرىن يېزىسى	Chörin yëzisi	ٴشورىن اۋىلى	Шарын	652328203
Baiyanghe Township	白杨河乡	Báiyánghé Xiāng	ئاقتېرەك يېزىسى	Aqtërak yëzisi	اقتەرەك اۋىلى	Ақтерек	652328204
Dashitou Township	大石头乡	Dàshítóu Xiāng	چوقبارتاش يېزىسى	Choqbartash yëzisi	شوقپارتاس اۋىلى	Шоқпартас	652328205
Bostan Township	博斯坦乡	Bósītǎn Xiāng	بوستان يېزىسى	Bostan yëzisi	بوستان اۋىلى	Бостан	652328207
Ethnic Township
Danangou Uzbek Ethnic Township	大南沟乌孜别克乡	Dànángōu Wūzībiékè Xiāng	دانەنگۇ ئۆزبېك يېزىسى	Danengu Özbëk yëzisi	دانانگۋ وزبەك ۇلتتىق اۋىلى		652328206

== Climate ==
Climate data for Mori, elevation 1,272 m (4,173 ft), (1991–2020 normals, extremes 1981–2010)
Month	Jan	Feb	Mar	Apr	May	Jun	Jul	Aug	Sep	Oct	Nov	Dec	Year
Record high °C (°F)	14.1 (57.4)	13.1 (55.6)	21.3 (70.3)	30.1 (86.2)	31.7 (89.1)	34.9 (94.8)	37.9 (100.2)	35.5 (95.9)	33.9 (93.0)	27.7 (81.9)	21.5 (70.7)	14.5 (58.1)	37.9 (100.2)
Mean daily maximum °C (°F)	−5.4 (22.3)	−2.8 (27.0)	4.3 (39.7)	14.9 (58.8)	20.6 (69.1)	25.4 (77.7)	27.5 (81.5)	26.7 (80.1)	21.3 (70.3)	12.6 (54.7)	3.2 (37.8)	−3.5 (25.7)	12.1 (53.7)
Daily mean °C (°F)	−11.5 (11.3)	−8.8 (16.2)	−1.4 (29.5)	8.6 (47.5)	14.4 (57.9)	19.5 (67.1)	21.4 (70.5)	20.1 (68.2)	14.5 (58.1)	6.3 (43.3)	−2.4 (27.7)	−9.3 (15.3)	6.0 (42.7)
Mean daily minimum °C (°F)	−16.1 (3.0)	−13.5 (7.7)	−5.8 (21.6)	3.6 (38.5)	8.9 (48.0)	14.1 (57.4)	16.1 (61.0)	14.8 (58.6)	9.4 (48.9)	2.2 (36.0)	−6.2 (20.8)	−13.7 (7.3)	1.2 (34.1)
Record low °C (°F)	−28.8 (−19.8)	−28.2 (−18.8)	−23.4 (−10.1)	−13.8 (7.2)	−6.3 (20.7)	1.3 (34.3)	7.1 (44.8)	0.1 (32.2)	−3.6 (25.5)	−14.6 (5.7)	−29.2 (−20.6)	−29.8 (−21.6)	−29.8 (−21.6)
Average precipitation mm (inches)	7.9 (0.31)	8.7 (0.34)	17.4 (0.69)	42.4 (1.67)	52.3 (2.06)	41.7 (1.64)	50.8 (2.00)	40.9 (1.61)	31.8 (1.25)	29.8 (1.17)	22.2 (0.87)	13.0 (0.51)	358.9 (14.12)
Average precipitation days (≥ 0.1 mm)	5.5	5.4	5.9	7.3	7.6	7.9	8.6	7.2	5.4	5.8	6.7	7.0	80.3
Average snowy days	9.6	9.1	7.9	4.5	1.4	0	0	0	0.6	4.1	8.4	10.3	55.9
Average relative humidity (%)	64	65	64	49	45	46	48	45	45	55	65	66	55
Mean monthly sunshine hours	193.7	205.8	254.8	261.8	304.6	303.0	298.6	297.3	272.6	242.7	185.1	179.1	2,999.1
Percentage possible sunshine	66	68	68	64	66	66	65	70	74	73	65	65	68
Source: China Meteorological Administration
