= Three Districts Economic Commission =

Defunct governing body in Xinjiang

The Ili District Council was a governing council that encompassing the three northernmost districts of Xinjiang Province, Republic of China: Ili, Tarbagatay (Tacheng) and Altay. It was established in 1946 after a Soviet-brokered peace agreement between the Republic of China (ROC) and the breakaway Second East Turkestan Republic (ETR), which led to the dissolution of the ETR and the establishment of the Coalition Government of Xinjiang Province; the interests of the ETR's former leaders were retained through the Ili District Council. The region retained its political independence.

The appointment of a pro-Chinese Uyghur official as head of the Coalition Government led to its collapse in August 1947, when the Ili District Council leaders withdrew in protest and established the Three Districts Economic Commission to continue governing the three districts independently from the rest of Xinjiang. In August 1949, most of the Three Districts Economic Commission's former leaders died in a plane crash in the Soviet Union, while en route to attend talks in Beijing. By the end of 1950, the Chinese People's Liberation Army (PLA) had captured most of the commission's former territory and incorporated it into Xinjiang Province, which became the Xinjiang Uyghur Autonomous Region in 1955. The three districts were reorganised as constituent parts of the Ili Kazakh Autonomous Prefecture in 1953.

== Background ==
The ETR was proclaimed on 12 November 1944, following successful uprisings in the Three Districts which began on 7 November. The uprisings came to be known collectively as the Ili Rebellion. The Interim Government of the ETR was formed, which consisted of Turkic intellectuals of various ideologies and political goals. The leadership was dominated by religious conservatives, who viewed the rebellion as a war of national liberation to restore the First East Turkestan Republic which had been founded exactly eleven years earlier. Soviet-educated progressives within the leadership viewed the rebellion as an anti-imperialist revolution against the ROC.

In August 1945, China signed a Treaty of Friendship and Alliance granting the Soviet Union a range of concessions that the United States promised at the Yalta Conference. This ended overt Soviet support for the East Turkestan Republic. The Kuomintang's central government of China reached a negotiated settlement with the leaders of the ETR in June 1946. On 27 June 1946, the Interim Government of the ETR passed Resolution 324 to transform the Interim Government of the ETR into the Ili District Council of Xinjiang Province and dissolve the ETR (the resolution used 'East Turkestan' to denote Xinjiang Province). The new council was not a government, and the Three Districts were respectively and directly led by the newly founded Coalition Government of Xinjiang Province along with the other seven districts in Xinjiang.

== History ==
On 1 July 1946, the Coalition Government of Xinjiang Province was established in Dihua. This government was constituted by three sides: the central government of China, the Three Districts, and the Uyghur-inhabited, anti-revolutionary Seven Districts (at the time, Xinjiang Province was divided into ten districts, and the Seven Districts were treated as a unit in the Coalition Government). In the 25 members of the Committee of the Coalition Government, there were seven from the central government, eight from the Three Districts, and ten from the Seven Districts. The communist Ehmetjan Qasimi, the leader of the Three Districts, became the Provincial Vice Chairman.

As the establishment of the Coalition Government, the unpopular governor Wu Zhongxin (chairman of the Government of Xinjiang Province) was replaced by Zhang Zhizhong (chairman of the Coalition Government of Xinjiang Province), who implemented pro-minority policies to placate the minority population in the Three Districts. After the establishment of the Coalition Government, in effect, little changed in the Three Districts. The Three Districts remained a de facto separate pro-Soviet area with its own currency and military forces. At the beginning, all the three sides of the Coalition Government placed their hopes in it. The Three Districts side discussed with the Coalition Government and the Seven Districts the union of the economy, finance, transport, postal-service systems of the ten districts in Xinjiang again. They discussed the army reorganization of the Three Districts, too. The Three Districts had withdrawn their army from the Seven Districts.

However, as the domestic and international situation changed, and the contradiction in the Coalition Government deepened, the Coalition Government was on the verge of collapse in 1947. During 1946 and 1947, the Kuomintang actively supported some local leaders opposing the Three Districts. By this time, these opposition figures included Kazakh leader Osman Batur, who broke with the other rebels when their pro-Soviet orientation became clear. In the Coalition Government, there were several important anti-revolutionary Uyghurs appointed by the Kuomintang, such as Muhammad Amin Bughra, Isa Alptekin and Masud Sabri. These three Uyghurs returned to Xinjiang with Zhang Zhizhong in 1945, when the negotiations started.

As there were too many difficulties, Zhang Zhizhong, the chairman of the Coalition Government, decided to escape from Xinjiang. Bai Chongxi, the defense minister of China and a Hui Muslim, was considered for appointment in 1947 as Governor of Xinjiang. But finally, according to Zhang Zhizhong's recommendation, the position was given instead to Masud Sabri, a pro-Kuomintang, anti-Soviet Uyghur. Ehmetjan Qasimi strongly opposed Masud Sabri becoming governor and demanded that Masud Sabri be sacked and that prisoners be released from Kuomintang jails as some of his demands to agreeing to visit Nanjing.

On 21 May 1947, the central government appointed Masud Sabri as the new chairman, and Isa Yusuf Alptekin the secretary-general of the Coalition Government. This was fiercely opposed by the Three Districts side, but supported by the Seven Districts side. Masud Sabri was close to conservatives in the CC Clique of the Kuomintang and undid all of Zhang Zhizhong's pro-minority reforms, which set off revolts and riots among the Uyghurs in the oases like Turfan (one of the Seven Districts. Riots in Turfan started in July 1947). On 12 August 1947, Ehmetjan Qasimi (the vice-chairman of the Coalition Government and the leader of the Three Districts) left Dihua and returned to Ili. Soon afterwards, all the representatives in the Coalition Government from the Three Districts side returned to Ili. The Three Districts leaders then established the Three Districts Economic Commission to govern the region independently from the rest of Xinjiang, marking the collapse of the Coalition Government.

=== Incorporation into the People's Republic of China ===
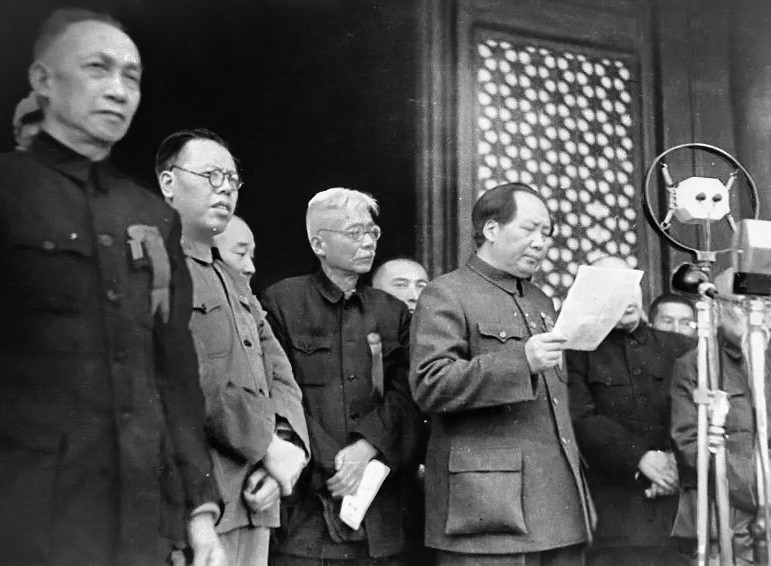
Seypidin Azizi standing behind Mao Zedong during the proclamation of the People's Republic of China on 1 October 1949 in Beijing

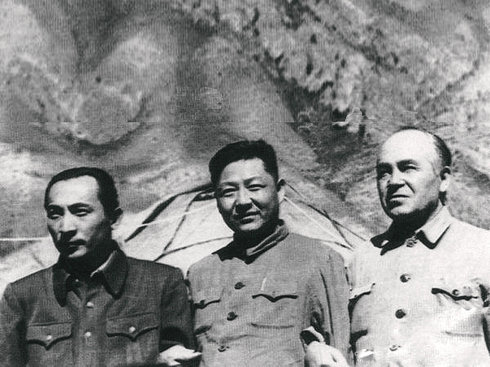
Seypidin Azizi, Xi Zhongxun (father of 6th paramount leader of China Xi Jinping), Burhan Shahidi in July 1952 after quelling the Ospan Batyr Kazakh insurgency in Xinjiang.

In August 1949, the People's Liberation Army captured Lanzhou, the capital of the Gansu Province, threatening Kuomintang administration in Xinjiang. The Kuomintang Xinjiang provincial leaders Tao Zhiyue and Burhan Shahidi led the KMT government and army's defection to the Chinese Communist Party (CCP) side in September 1949. In October 1949, the Mao Zedong proclaimed the People's Republic of China (PRC). By the end of 1949, some Kuomintang officials had fled to Afghanistan, India and Pakistan, but most crossed over or surrendered to the CCP.

On 17 August 1949, the CCP sent Deng Liqun to negotiate with the Three Districts' leadership in Ghulja (Yining). Mao invited the leaders of the Three Districts to take part in the Chinese People's Political Consultative Conference later that year. The leaders of the Three Districts traveled to the Soviet Union on 22 August by automobiles through Khorgos, accompanied by Soviet vice-consul in Ghulja Vasiliy Borisov, where they were told to cooperate with the CCP. Negotiations between Three Districts and Soviet representatives in Alma-Ata continued for three days and were difficult because of the unwillingness of Three Districts leader Ehmetjan Qasimi (whose strategy was opposed by two other delegates – Abdukerim Abbasov and Luo Zhi – while Generals Ishaq Beg and Dalelkhan supported Ehmetjan) to agree to incorporate the Three Districts into the future Chinese communist state, supposedly in 1951. Qasimi regarded the current situation as a historic opportunity for Uyghurs and the other Turkic peoples of Xinjiang to gain freedom and independence that should not be lost. So, the Three Districts delegation was offered to continue negotiations in Moscow directly with Stalin before departure to Beijing.

On 25 August, the eleven delegates, Ehmetjan Qasimi, Abdukerim Abbasov, Ishaq Beg, Luo Zhi, Dalelkhan Sugirbayev and accompanying officers of the Three Districts, boarded the Ilyushin Il-12 plane in Alma-Ata, Kazakhstan, officially heading to Beijing, but the flight was diverted to Moscow. On 3 September, the Soviet Union informed the Chinese government that the plane had crashed near Lake Baikal en route to Beijing, killing all on board. On the same day Soviet official Vyacheslav Molotov sent a telegram to Ghulja to inform Seypidin Azizi (interim leader of the Three Districts when Ehmetjan Qasimi was not in Ili, and a member of Communist Party of Soviet Union) about the "tragic death of devoted revolutionaries, including Ehmetjan Qasimi, in airplane crash near Lake Baikal en route to Beijing." In accordance with instructions from Moscow, Seypidin Azizi kept the news secret from the population of the Three Districts and it was unreported by Beijing for several months until December 1949, when Seypidin Azizi departed to Moscow to join Mao Zedong's delegation to sign the Sino-Soviet Treaty of Friendship, Alliance and Mutual Assistance with Stalin and to retrieve the bodies of the Three Districts leaders (their already unrecognisable bodies were delivered from the Soviet Union in April 1950) and when the PLA had already secured most of the former Xinjiang Province.

After the dissolution of the Soviet Union in 1991, some former KGB generals and high officers (among them Pavel Sudoplatov) revealed that the five leaders were killed on Stalin's orders in Moscow on 27 August 1949, after a three-day imprisonment in the former tsar's stables, having been arrested upon arrival in Moscow by the head of MGB Colonel General Viktor Abakumov, who personally interrogated the Three Districts leaders, then ordered their execution. This was allegedly done in accordance with a deal between Stalin and Mao Zedong. The remaining important figures of the Three Districts, including Seypidin Azizi (who led the second delegation of the Three Districts, which participated in Chinese People's Political Consultative Conference in September in Beijing, which proclaimed the People's Republic of China on 1 October 1949), agreed to incorporate the Three Districts into Xinjiang Province and accept important positions within the administration. However, some Kazakhs led by Osman Batur continued their resistance until 1954. Seypidin then became the first chairman of the Xinjiang Uyghur Autonomous Region, which replaced Xinjiang Province in 1955. First People's Liberation Army units arrived at Dihua airport on 20 October 1949 on Soviet airplanes, provided by Stalin, and quickly established control in northern Xinjiang, then, together with units of the National Army of the Three Districts, entered southern Xinjiang, thus establishing control over all ten districts of Xinjiang Province. Earlier, on a single day, on 26 September 1949, 100,000 Kuomintang Army troops in the province switched their allegiance from Kuomintang to the Chinese Communist Party together with the chairman of Xinjiang Provincial Government Burhan Shahidi, who was among the few who knew what actually happened to the First delegation of the Three Districts in August in the Soviet Union. On 20 December 1949 the East Turkestan National Army joined PLA as its 5th Army. The province's final status was instituted in 1955, when it was reorganised into an autonomous region for the 13 nationalities of Xinjiang (Uyghur, Han Chinese, Kazakh, Kyrgyz, Hui, Mongol, Tajik, Uzbek, Tatar, Russian, Xibe, Daur, Manchu people).
