= Coalition Government of Xinjiang Province =

1946–1947 government of Xinjiang, China

Coalition Government of Xinjiang Province 新疆省聯合政府
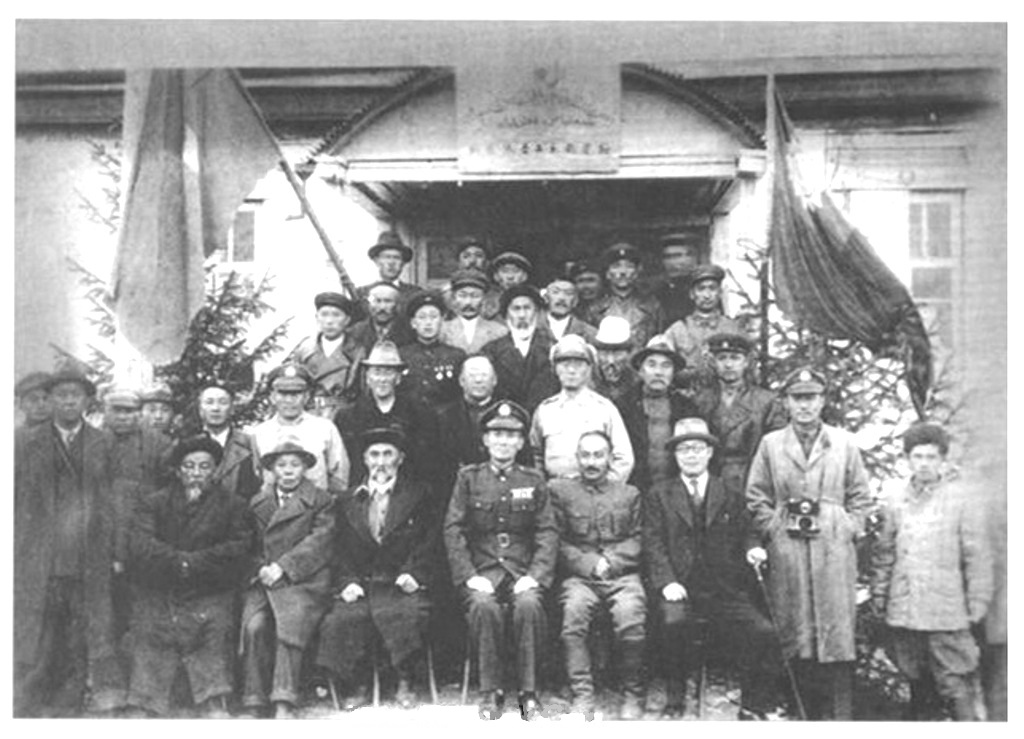
- Representatives of the Republic of China and East Turkestan Republic in Dihua (present-day Ürümqi)
- Formation: 1 July 1946
- Extinction: 12 August 1947
- Province: Xinjiang Province
- Country: Republic of China

Executive branch
- Chairman: Zhang Zhizhong (1946–1947); Masud Sabri (1947)
- Vice Chairmen: Ehmetjan Qasimi and Burhan Shahidi
- Appointed by: Government of the Republic of China in Nanjing
- Headquarters: Dihua (Ürümqi)

The Coalition Government of Xinjiang Province (Chinese: 新疆省聯合政府; pinyin: Xīnjiāng Shěng Liánhé Zhèngfǔ) was the governing body of China's Xinjiang Province from 1946 to 1947. It was formed after a Soviet-brokered peace agreement between the Republic of China (ROC) and the breakaway Second East Turkestan Republic (ETR). The dissolution of the ETR coincided with the establishment of the coalition government; however, the interests of the ETR's former leaders were retained through the subordinate Ili District Council. The coalition government collapsed after the withdrawal of the former ETR side, which opposed the appointment of Masud Sabri, a pro-Kuomintang conservative, as the provincial chairman. Despite himself being a Turkic Uyghur, Masud undid the pro-Turkic reforms implemented by his predecessor Zhang Zhizhong.

== Background ==
During the Republican Era in China (1912–1949), Xinjiang was de jure governed as a province divided into ten districts. In actuality, however, control of Xinjiang was split between various warlords, most of whom were regional commanders of the ROC's National Revolutionary Army. The ROC central government in Nanjing eventually centered the region's governance around the Chinese warlord Sheng Shicai by 1934. However, he was dismissed in 1944 after Soviet officials notified their Chinese counterparts of Sheng's plot to surrender Xinjiang to the Soviet Union in exchange for a top position in the Soviet government. The new ROC government sent to replace Sheng was in disarray, and Turkic political leaders in the "Three Districts" of northern Xinjiang – Ili, Tarbagatay, and Altay – seized the opportunity to secede, with the encouragement of the Soviets.

The ETR was proclaimed on 12 November 1944, following successful uprisings in the Three Districts which began on 7 November. The uprisings came to be known collectively as the Ili Rebellion. The Interim Government of the ETR was formed, which consisted of Turkic intellectuals of various ideologies and political goals. The leadership was dominated by religious conservatives, who viewed the rebellion as a war of national liberation to restore the First East Turkestan Republic which had been founded exactly eleven years earlier. Soviet-educated progressives within the leadership viewed the rebellion as an anti-imperialist revolution against the ROC.

== History ==
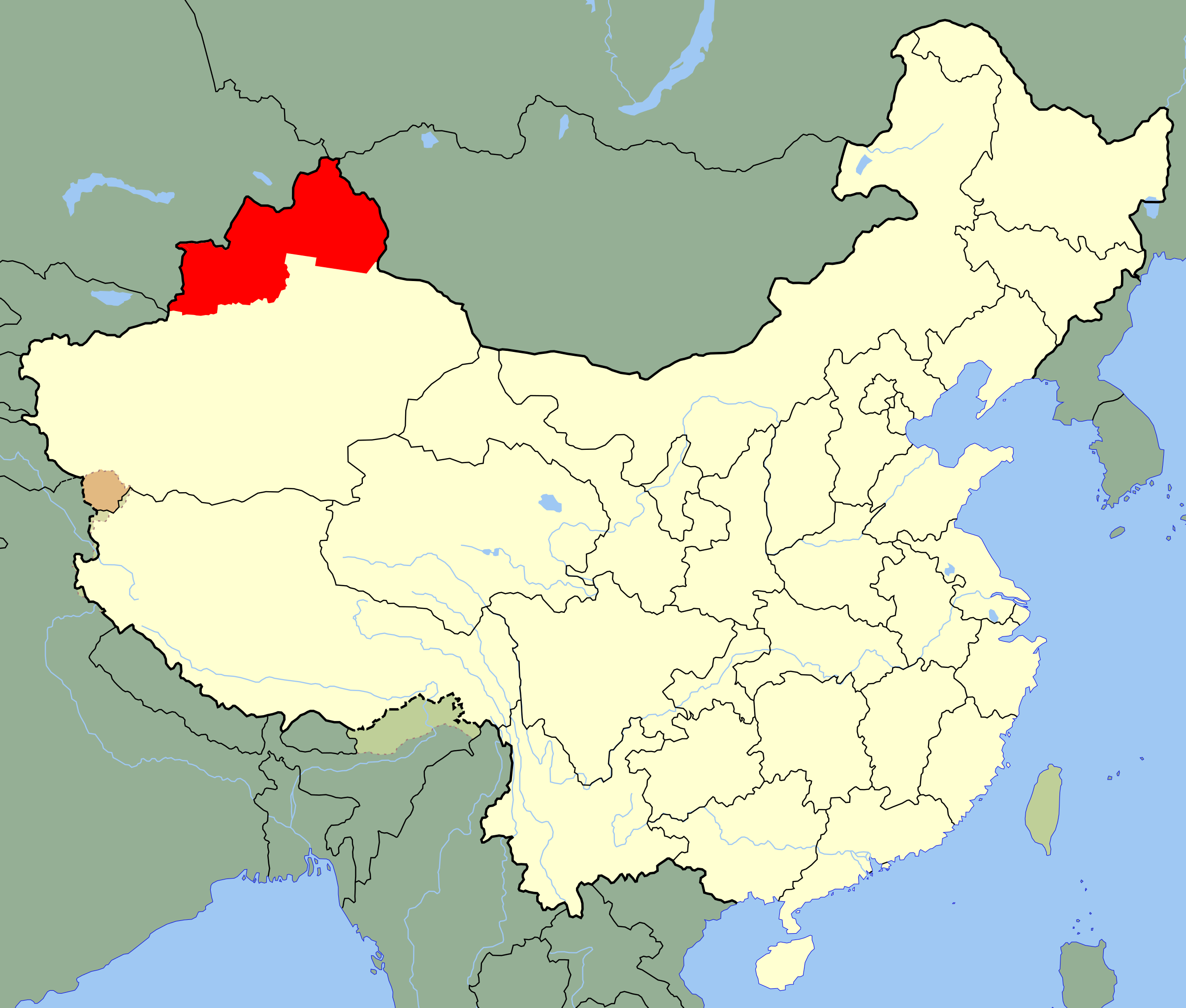
Territorial extent of the Second East Turkestan Republic, encompassing the three districts of Ili, Tarbagatay and Altay

In August 1945, China signed a Treaty of Friendship and Alliance that granted the Soviet Union a range of concessions that the United States promised at the Yalta Conference. This ended overt Soviet support for the ETR. The ROC and ETR reached a peace agreement on 2 January 1946 and a negotiated settlement on 27 June 1946. The Interim Government of the ETR passed Resolution 324 the same day, transforming itself into the "Ili District Council" and dissolving the ETR. The new council was not a government, and would be subordinate to a future coalition government, along with the Seven Districts of southern Xinjiang.

On 1 July 1946, the Coalition Government of Xinjiang Province was established in Dihua (present-day Ürümqi). This government consisted of three parties: representatives of the ROC central government; representatives of the Three Districts of northern Xinjiang, i.e. the former leadership of the ETR; and representatives of the Seven Districts of southern Xinjiang. Of the 25 members of the coalition government's committee, seven were from the ROC central government, eight from the Three Districts, and ten from the Seven Districts.

The unpopular governor of Xinjiang Wu Zhongxin (as Chairman of the Government of Xinjiang Province) was replaced by Zhang Zhizhong (as Chairman of the Coalition Government of Xinjiang), who implemented policies that protected the cultural and religious rights of the Turkic majority. Ehmetjan Qasimi, a communist revolutionary who led the Ili District Council, and Burhan Shahidi, a political moderate favoured by the ROC, became the provincial vice chairmen.

Little changed in the Three Districts after the establishment of the coalition government. The Three Districts remained a de facto independent, pro-Soviet area with its own currency and military (the Ili National Army, formerly the East Turkestan National Army). However, all three sides were nonetheless invested in the success of the coalition government. Of primary issue was the future reunification of Xinjiang's economy, finances, military, postal services, and transport.

However, the disagreements between the three sides deepened as the domestic and international situations changed, and by 1947 the coalition government was on the verge of collapse. The ROC was actively supporting local warlords who were opposed to the leadership of the Three Districts, such as Osman Batur, who broke with the Three Districts' leaders when their pro-Soviet orientation became clear. Many ROC-appointed Uyghur representatives also opposed the Three Districts side, such as Muhammad Amin Bughra, Isa Yusuf Alptekin, and Masud Sabri, the three of whom accompanied Zhang during his return trip to Xinjiang to begin negotiations with the ETR in 1945.

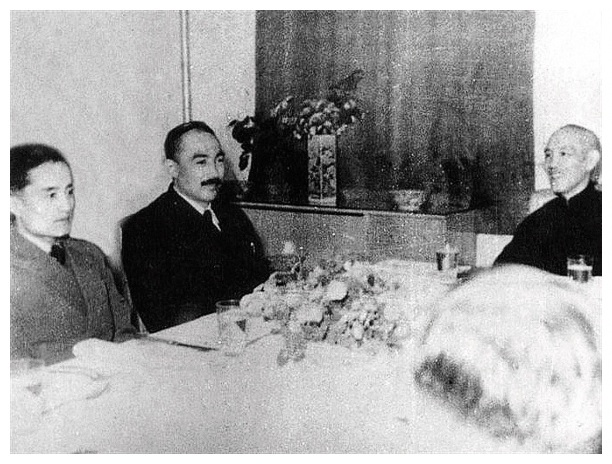
Ehmetjan Qasimi and Abdukerim Abbasov with Chiang Kai-shek in Nanjing on 22 November 1946

Zhang, unable to remedy the situation, resigned from his post and left Xinjiang in 1947. Zhang later wrote in his memoirs that he resigned because he believed the leader of Xinjiang should not be of the Han Chinese minority, felt alienated from the Chinese political center in Nanjing, and was a common scapegoat for the various factions of the coalition government. Zhang initially considered the provincial vice chairmen – Ehmetjan and Burhan – as candidates to succeed him. However, Zhang later changed his mind and recommended Masud, concluding that Ehmetjan was too close to radicals on the Three Districts side and Burhan was too unfamiliar with the Chinese leadership in Nanjing. The ROC central government meanwhile considered Bai Chongxi, the Defence Minister of China and a Hui Muslim, as Zhang's replacement.

The coalition government's chairmanship was ultimately given to Masud on 21 May 1947. Ehmetjan strongly opposed Masud's appointment and demanded Masud's dismissal as one of his preconditions for visiting Nanjing. Ehmetjan's position was supported by the Three Districts side but opposed by the Seven Districts side. Masud was close to conservatives in the CC Clique of the Kuomintang (Chinese Nationalists) and undid all of Zhang's pro-minority reforms, which set off revolts and riots among the Uyghurs in oases such as Turpan in July 1947. On 12 August 1947, Ehmetjan left Dihua and returned to Ghulja. Soon afterwards, all of the other representatives from the Three Districts side also returned to Ghulja. The Three Districts leadership subsequently established the "Three Districts Economic Commission" to govern the region independently from the rest of Xinjiang, marking the collapse of the coalition government.
