= Xinjiang Province, People's Republic of China =

Former province of the People's Republic of China

Xinjiang Province 新疆省
- Province
- 1949–1955
- Xinjiang Province (red) in the People's Republic of China
- Capital: Dihua
- Area
  - Total area: 1,710,000 km^{2} (660,000 sq mi)
- Population
  - 1953 census: 4,873,608
- Government
- Party Secretary
  - 1949–1952: Wang Zhen
  - 1952–1955: Wang Enmao
- Governor
  - 1949–1955: Burhan Shahidi
- History
  - Established: 1949
  - Disestablished: 1955
Preceded by	Succeeded by
Xinjiang Province, Republic of China; Three Districts Economic Commission	Xinjiang Uygur Autonomous Region

Xinjiang Province (Chinese: 新疆省; pinyin: Xīnjiāng Shěng) was a province of the People's Republic of China (PRC) from 1949 to 1955. It was founded in 1949 after the incorporation of Xinjiang into the People's Republic of China. In 1955, it was replaced by the Xinjiang Uygur Autonomous Region.

== History ==
During the final stages of the Chinese Civil War, the People's Liberation Army (PLA) held a decisive advantage, while the Nationalist Army suffered successive defeats. After the First Field Army, commanded by Peng Dehuai, captured Lanzhou and subsequently the entire Gansu province on August 26, 1949, the military and political leaders of Xinjiang Province, including Tao Zhiyue and Burhan Shahidi, declared an uprising against the ROC government. Zhang Zhizhong, who had already sided with the Chinese Communist Party (CCP), mediated the conflict, while Deng Liqun served as the CCP's negotiator. That same year, the Soviet Union ordered the Three Districts Economic Commission insurgents to halt their advance into Dihua (now Ürümqi) and surrender to the People's Republic of China. On September 25, the First Army Corps of the First Field Army, led by General Wang Zhen, captured Dihua, making Xinjiang a province of the People's Republic of China. On December 17, the Xinjiang Provincial People's Government was established, with Burhan Shahidi as its first chairman.

On September 13, 1955, the 21st meeting of the Standing Committee of the 1st National People's Congress decided to abolish Xinjiang Province and establish the Xinjiang Uygur Autonomous Region, with the original administrative area of Xinjiang Province as its administrative area. On October 1, the Xinjiang Uygur Autonomous Region was established, and the Xinjiang Uygur Autonomous Region People's Committee was subsequently established. Xinjiang became one of China's five provincial-level minority autonomous regions, and the name "Xinjiang Province" became history.

== Politics ==
In 1949, after the Xinjiang Provincial Government of the Republic of China surrendered to the Chinese Communist Party, it was replaced by the newly established Xinjiang Provincial People's Government on December 17 of the same year. Burhan served as the chairman of the Xinjiang Provincial People's Government (1949–1954). On October 1, 1955, the Xinjiang Uygur Autonomous Region was established, and the People's Committee of the Xinjiang Uygur Autonomous Region was subsequently established.

=== Administrative divisions ===
In 1954, Xinjiang Province comprised 1 administrative region, 10 special districts, 5 autonomous prefectures, 1 provincial-level city, 2 cities, 73 counties, and 6 autonomous counties.

The administrative divisions of Xinjiang Province in 1954
Prefecture-level cities and special districts	Number of counties and districts	Administrative center	County (seat)
Dihua			
Dihua Special Zone	8 counties, 1 autonomous county	Ürümqi	Fukang County (urban area), Shanshan County (urban area), Qitai County (urban area), Hutubi County (urban area), Turpan County (urban area), Jimsar County (urban area), Manas County (urban area), Toksun County (urban area), Muleihe Kazakh Autonomous County (urban area)
Hami Special Zone	2 counties, 1 autonomous county	Hami County	Hami County (urban area), Yiwu County (urban area), Barkol Kazakh Autonomous County (urban area)
Korla Special Zone	5 counties	Korla County	Korla County (urban area), Yuli County (urban area), Luntai County (urban area), Ruoqiang County (urban area), Qiemo County (urban area)
Southern Xinjiang Administrative Office	1 city, 26 counties, and 1 autonomous county	Kashgar	Kashgar Prefecture (headquartered in Kashgar City): Kashgar City, Shufu County (urban area), Shule County (urban area), Bachu County (urban area), Yingjisha County (urban area), Yuepuhu County (urban area), Jiashi County (urban area), Tashkurgan Tajik Autonomous County (urban area).
Southern Xinjiang Administrative Office	1 city, 26 counties, and 1 autonomous county	Kashgar	Shache Special Zone (based in Shache County): Shache County (urban area), Zepu County (urban area), Yecheng County (urban area), Maigati County (urban area)
Southern Xinjiang Administrative Office	1 city, 26 counties, and 1 autonomous county	Kashgar	Hotan Special District (based in Hotan County): Hotan County (urban area), Ceqin County (urban area), Pishan County (urban area), Minfeng County (urban area), Luopu County (urban area), Yutian County (urban area), Moyu County (urban area)
Southern Xinjiang Administrative Office	1 city, 26 counties, and 1 autonomous county	Kashgar	Aksu Special District (headquartered in Aksu County): Aksu County (urban area), Kuqa County (urban area), Shaya County (urban area), Uqturpan County (urban area), Xinhe County (urban area), Awat County (urban area), Wensu County (urban area), Keping County (urban area), Baicheng County (urban area)
Southern Xinjiang Administrative Office	1 city, 26 counties, and 1 autonomous county	Kashgar	Kizilsu Kyrgyz Autonomous Region (headquartered in Artush County): Artush County (urban area), Wuqia County (urban area), Akqi County (urban area)
Changji Hui Autonomous Prefecture	3 counties	Changji County	Changji County (urban area), Miquan County (urban area), Ürümqi County (urban area)
Bayingolin Mongol Autonomous Prefecture	2 counties, 1 autonomous county	Yanqi Hui Autonomous County	Hejing County (urban area), Heshuo County (urban area), and Yanqi Hui Autonomous County (urban area)
Ili Kazakh Autonomous Prefecture	1 city, 24 counties, 2 autonomous counties	Yining City	Ili Prefecture (headquartered in Yining City): Yining City, Yining County (Yining City), Tekes County (urban area), Suiding County (urban area), Zhaosu County (urban area), Xinyuan County (urban area), Gongliu County (urban area), Huocheng County (urban area), Nileke County (urban area), and Chabuchar Xibe Autonomous County (urban area).
Ili Kazakh Autonomous Prefecture	1 city, 24 counties, 2 autonomous counties	Yining City	Tacheng Special District (located in Tacheng County): Tacheng County (urban area), Shawan County (urban area), Emin County (urban area), Wusu County (urban area), Yumin County (urban area), Tuoli County (urban area), and Hoboksar Mongol Autonomous County (urban area).
Ili Kazakh Autonomous Prefecture	1 city, 24 counties, 2 autonomous counties	Yining City	Altay Special District (headquartered in Altay County): Altay County (urban area), Fuhai County (urban area), Jimunai County (urban area), Qinghe County (urban area), Habahe County (urban area), Fuyun County (urban area), Bulinjin County (urban area).
Ili Kazakh Autonomous Prefecture	1 city, 24 counties, 2 autonomous counties	Yining City	Bortala Mongol Autonomous Region (seat in Bole County): Bole County (urban area), Jinghe County (urban area), Wenquan County (urban area)

== Demographics ==
Ethnic breakdown of the Xinjiang (1953)
Ethnicity	Percentage
Uyghurs	74.7%
Others	25.3%

According to the 1953 Chinese census published by the National Bureau of Statistics on November 1, 1954, as of 30 June 1953, the population of Xinjiang Province was 4,873,608. Uyghurs made up 74.7% of the population, or 3,640,125 people, while Han and other ethnic groups made up 25.3% of the population, or 1,233,483 people.
