= Incorporation of Xinjiang into the People's Republic of China =

- Part of the Chinese Civil War
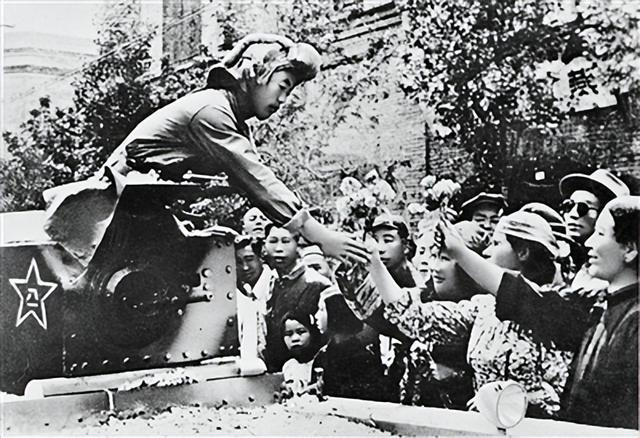
- A People's Liberation Army tank crew is welcomed by locals as it enters Dihua (Ürümqi), the capital of Xinjiang.
Date	12 October – 22 December 1949 (2 months, 1 week and 3 days)
Location	Xinjiang
Result	Communist victory
Territorial changes	Xinjiang is incorporated into the People's Republic of China

Belligerents
People's Republic of China: People's Liberation Army; First Field Army	Republic of China: Republic of China Army	Three Districts Economic Commission: Ili National Army

Commanders and leaders
Mao Zedong; Peng Dehuai; Wang Zhen	Burhan Shahidi; Tao Zhiyue; Yulbars Khan; Osman Batur	Ehmetjan Qasimi #; Abdukerim Abbasov #; Seypidin Azizi

Strength
80,000	100,000	40,000

The incorporation of Xinjiang into the People's Republic of China, known in Chinese historiography as the Peaceful Liberation of Xinjiang (Chinese: 新疆和平解放), was the takeover of Xinjiang by the Chinese Communist Party (CCP) and its People's Liberation Army (PLA) in the waning days of the Chinese Civil War. At the time, Xinjiang was divided into ten districts. The Republic of China (ROC) controlled seven districts and governed them as Xinjiang Province, while the other three (Ili, Tarbagatay, and Altay) were governed by the Three Districts Economic Commission which consisted of the former leadership of the Soviet-backed Second East Turkestan Republic.

In the summer of 1949, the PLA drove into the Hexi Corridor of Gansu Province and pressed toward Xinjiang. The People's Republic of China (PRC) was proclaimed on 1 October 1949, and PLA general Wang Zhen was tasked by his superior Peng Dehuai with taking Xinjiang. In the fall of 1949, the CCP reached separate agreements with the political leadership of the ROC and the Three Districts.

The CCP persuaded the ROC provincial and military leadership to surrender. The Soviet Union induced the leaders of the Three Districts to accede to the CCP. In August 1949, Ehmetjan Qasimi and his delegation of four other top ETR leaders died in a plane crash en route to Beijing to attend the Chinese People's Political Consultative Conference, the CCP's apex united front conference. In December, the PRC government incorporated the Ili National Army (formerly the East Turkestan National Army) into the PLA. Most of the remaining Three Districts leadership accepted the absorption of the autonomous Three Districts into the PRC. They subsequently joined the surrendered ROC officials in taking senior positions in the PRC government.

The PRC's takeover of Xinjiang was largely achieved through political means and thus faced little armed resistance. The PLA entered Xinjiang in October 1949 and controlled most of the region by the spring of 1950. Among the major military actors in Xinjiang, only Yulbars Khan, an ROC loyalist, and Osman Batur, a former ETR commander turned ROC supporter, fought against the CCP. They were both defeated by the PLA.

== Accession of the Three Districts (former East Turkestan Republic) ==
The Second ETR, initially led by Elihan Tore, was founded in November 1944 during the Ili Rebellion with Soviet support and was based in three northwest districts of Xinjiang. Tore disappeared in the Soviet Union in 1946, and another ETR leader, Ehmetjan Qasimi, head of the pro-Soviet Sinkiang Turkic People's National Liberation Committee, reached a political agreement with the Nationalist Chinese leader Zhang Zhizhong to form a coalition provincial government in Dihua (present-day Urumqi). The Second ETR was disbanded in name but the Three Districts retained autonomy. Ehmetjan became the vice-chairman of the coalition government. In June 1947, the Nationalist Chinese forces clashed with Mongolian and Soviet forces at Beitashan in northeastern Xinjiang. In that conflict, Kazakh leader Osman Batur of the ETR repudiated the ETR and defected to join Nationalist Chinese forces in fighting against Soviet-backed Mongolian forces.

In August 1949, the People's Liberation Army captured Lanzhou, the capital of the Gansu Province. Kuomintang administration in Xinjiang was threatened. The Kuomintang Xinjiang provincial leaders Tao Zhiyue and Burhan Shahidi led the KMT government and army's defection to the Chinese Communist Party (CCP) side in September 1949. By the end of 1949, some Kuomintang officials fled to Afghanistan, India and Pakistan, but most crossed over or surrendered to the CCP. On 17 August 1949, the Chinese Communist Party sent Deng Liqun to negotiate with the Three Districts' leadership in Ghulja (Yining in Chinese). Mao Zedong invited the leaders of the Three Districts to take part in the Chinese People's Political Consultative Conference later that year. The leaders of the Three Districts traveled to the Soviet Union on 22 August by automobiles through Horgos, accompanied by Soviet vice-consul in Ghulja Vasiliy Borisov, where they were told to cooperate with the Chinese Communist Party. Negotiations between Three Districts and Soviet representatives in Alma-Ata continued for three days and were difficult because of the unwillingness of Three Districts leader Ehmetjan Qasimi (whose strategy was opposed by two other delegates-Abdukerim Abbasov and Luo Zhi, while Generals Ishaq Beg and Dalelkhan supported Ehmetjan) to agree to incorporate the Three Districts into the future Chinese communist state, supposedly in 1951. The People's Republic of China was proclaimed two years earlier, on 1 October 1949. Ehmetjan regarded the current situation as a historic opportunity for Uyghurs and other people of Xinjiang to gain freedom and independence that shouldn't be lost. So, the Three Districts delegation was offered to continue negotiations in Moscow directly with Stalin before departure to Beijing. On 25 August, the eleven delegates, Ehmetjan Qasimi, Abdukerim Abbasov, Ishaq Beg, Luo Zhi, Dalelkhan Sugirbayev and accompanying officers of the Three Districts, boarded Ilyushin Il-12 plane in Alma-Ata, Kazakhstan, officially heading to Beijing, but flight was diverted for Moscow. On 3 September, the Soviet Union informed the Chinese government that the plane had crashed near Lake Baikal en route to Beijing, killing all on board. On the same day Molotov sent a telegram to Ghulja to inform Seypidin Azizi (interim leader of the Three Districts when Ehmetjan Qasimi was not in Ili, and a member of Communist Party of Soviet Union) about the Tragic death of devoted revolutionaries, including Ehmetjan Qasimi, in airplane crash near Lake Baikal en route to Beijing. In accordance with instructions from Moscow, Seypidin Azizi kept the news secret from the population of the Three Districts and it was unreported by Beijing for several months until December 1949, when Seypidin Azizi departed to Moscow to join Mao Zedong's delegation to sign Sino-Soviet Treaty of Friendship with Stalin and to retrieve bodies of The Three Districts leaders (their already unrecognisable bodies were delivered from the USSR in April 1950) and when the People's Liberation Army had already secured most of the regions of the former Xinjiang Province.

After the dissolution of the Soviet Union in 1991, some former KGB generals and high officers (among them Pavel Sudoplatov) revealed that the five leaders were killed on Stalin's orders in Moscow on 27 August 1949, after a three-day imprisonment in the former Tsar's stables, having been arrested upon arrival in Moscow by the Head of MGB Colonel General Viktor Abakumov, who personally interrogated the Three Districts leaders, then ordered their execution. This was allegedly done in accordance with a deal between Stalin and Mao Zedong. The remaining important figures of the Three Districts, including Seypidin Azizi (who led the Second delegation of the Three Districts, which participated in Chinese People's Political Consultative Conference in September in Beijing, which proclaimed the People's Republic of China on 1 October 1949), agreed to incorporate the Three Districts into the Xinjiang Province and accept important positions within the administration. However, some Kazakhs led by Osman Batur continued their resistance until 1954. Units of the People's Liberation Army first arrived at Ürümqi airport on 20 October 1949 on Soviet airplanes, provided by Stalin, and quickly established control in northern Xinjiang, before moving into southern Xinjiang together with units of the National Army of the Three Districts, thus establishing control over all ten districts of Xinjiang Province. On 20 December 1949 the Ili National Army joined the People's Liberation Army as the Xinjiang 5th Army Corps, which underwent reforms before being eventually disbanded.

== Accession of the KMT in Xinjiang ==
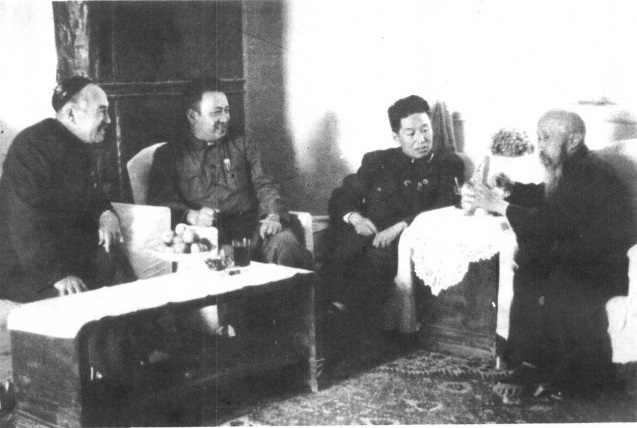
The first sentimental group sent by the central government of PRC to Xinjiang.

On 25 September, Tao Zhiyue and Burhan Shahidi, the KMT's military general and political leader in Dihua, respectively, announced the formal surrender of Nationalist forces in Xinjiang to the CCP. The next day, 100,000 Kuomintang troops in the province switched their allegiance from the Kuomintang to the Chinese Communist Party together with the Chairman of Xinjiang Provincial Government Burhan Shahidi, who was among the few cognizant of what had happened to the First delegation of the Three Districts in August in the USSR. On 12 October, the PLA entered Xinjiang. Many other KMT generals in Xinjiang like the Salar Muslim General Han Youwen joined in the defection to the PLA. They continued to serve in the PLA as officers in Xinjiang. Some KMT leaders who refused to submit fled to Taiwan or Turkey. Ma Chengxiang fled via India to Taiwan. Muhammad Amin Bughra and Isa Yusuf Alptekin fled to Turkey. Masud Sabri was arrested by the CCP and died in prison in 1952.

The only organized resistance the PLA encountered was from Osman Batur's Kazak militia and from Yulbars Khan's White Russian and Hui troops who served the Republic of China. Batur pledged his allegiance to the KMT and was killed in 1951. Yulbars Khan battled PLA forces at the Battle of Yiwu, but when he was deserted, he fled through Tibet, evading the Dalai Lama's forces which harassed him, and escaped to Taiwan via India to join the Republic of China regime. The province's final status was instituted in 1955 as the Xinjiang Uyghur Autonomous Region of which Seypidin Azizi became its first chairman, when it was reorganised into an autonomous region for the 13 nationalities of Xinjiang (Uyghur, Han Chinese, Kazakh, Kyrgyz, Hui, Mongol, Tajik, Uzbek, Tatar, Russian, Xibe, Daur, Manchu people), thus replacing the Xinjiang Province (1884–1955).

== Legacy of the ETR ==
In the People's Republic of China, the five ETR leaders who perished in the 1949 plane crash are remembered as heroes in the struggle against the Nationalist regime. Their remains were returned to China in April 1950 and later reburied in a heroes' memorial cemetery in Yining. The cemetery has a stele with calligraphy by Mao Zedong, praising the heroes for their contributions to the Chinese people's revolution.

The East Turkistan Government in Exile views Xinjiang's governance by the People's Republic of China as an "illegal military occupation".

== In popular culture ==
The event was portrayed in the 2013 television film Anarhan, directed by Yang Qingxiu and Yu Dian, which aired on China Central Television (CCTV). It was also the directorial debut of popular Chinese Uyghur actress Dilraba Dilmurat. The film was a remake of a 1960s film of the same name.

== See also ==
- History of Xinjiang
- Xinjiang conflict
- East Turkestan independence movement
- Persecution of Uyghurs in China
- Annexation of Tibet by the People's Republic of China
