= Burhan Shahidi =

Chinese politician (1894–1989)

- 包尔汉·沙希迪; بۇرھان شەھىدى; Борһан Шәһиди
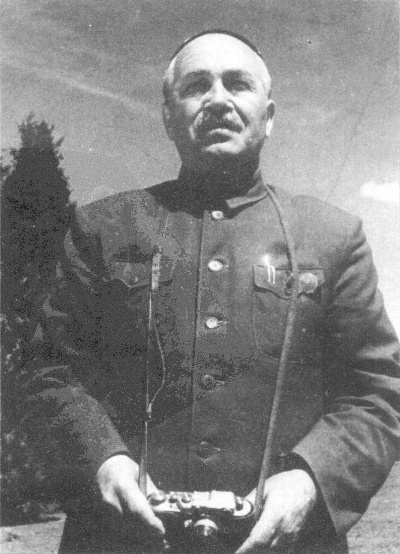
- Burhan in 1950

Vice Chairman of the Chinese People's Political Consultative Conference
- In office 12 September 1980 – 10 April 1988
- Chairman: Deng Xiaoping; Deng Yingchao
- In office 25 December 1954 – 5 January 1965
- Chairman: Zhou Enlai

Chairman of the Xinjiang Uyghur Autonomous Regional Political Consultative Conference
- In office October 1955 – March 1964
- Preceded by: Seypidin Azizi
- Succeeded by: Wang Enmao

Chairman of the Xinjiang Provincial People's Government
- In office October 1949 – January 1955
- Preceded by: new position
- Succeeded by: Seypidin Azizi (Chairman of the Xinjiang Uyghur Autonomous Regional Revolutionary Committee)

Governor of Xinjiang
- In office 30 December 1948 – September 1949
- Preceded by: Masud Sabri
- Succeeded by: Yulbars Khan (in exile)

Personal details
- Born: 3 October 1894 Tetyushsky Uyezd, Kazan Governorate, Russian Empire
- Died: 27 August 1989 (aged 94) Beijing, China
- Party: Kuomintang (until 1949); Chinese Communist Party (joined 1949)
- Spouse: Reshide Khanum

Military service
- Allegiance: Republic of China (until 1949); People's Republic of China (from 1949)

Chinese name
- Simplified Chinese: 包尔汉·沙希迪
- Traditional Chinese: 包爾漢·沙希迪
Transcriptions
Standard Mandarin
- Hanyu Pinyin: Bāo'érhàn Shāxīdí
- Wade–Giles: Pao^{1}-erh^{2}-han^{4} Sha^{1}-hsi^{1}-ti^{2}

Uyghur name
- Uyghur: بۇرھان شەھىدى
Transcriptions
- Latin Yëziqi: Burhan Shehidi

Russian name
- Russian: Бурхан Шахиди

Tatar name
- Tatar: Борһан Шәһиди; Borhan Şähidi

Burhan Shahidi (3 October 1894 – 27 August 1989) was a Chinese politician of Tatar and Uyghur ethnicity who occupied several top positions in Xinjiang, initially in the government of the Republic of China (ROC) and then government of the People's Republic of China (PRC). He served as the ROC's vice-chairman in the Coalition Government of Xinjiang Province, formed between the ROC and the Second East Turkestan Republic in 1946. After the coalition government's dissolution the following year and the incorporation of Xinjiang into the PRC in 1949, Burhan joined the Chinese Communist Party and was appointed the first and only chairman of the Xinjiang Provincial People's Government, before it became the Xinjiang Uyghur Autonomous Regional Government in 1955. He later served as the vice-chairman of the second, third, fifth, and sixth national committees of the Chinese People's Political Consultative Conference. He was also the founder and inaugural president of the Islamic Association of China.

== Life ==
=== Early life ===
In his autobiography, Burhan Shahidi writes that he was born in 1894 in a small village in Tetyushsky Uyezd, Kazan Governorate, Russia. His mother was a Volga Tatar and his father was a Uyghur from Yileke village, in what is now Aksu City, Xinjiang, China. His family was poor and he received little schooling in his early years. In 1912, after the Qing dynasty was overthrown, he accompanied Tatar merchants to Dihua (now Ürümqi) in Xinjiang, and worked as an apprentice and store-clerk.

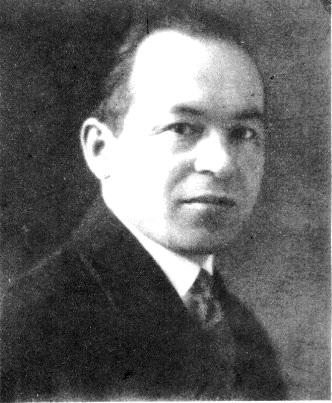
Burhan in 1929

In 1914, he was able to apply and receive Chinese citizenship from the Republic of China on account of his family's ancestry. He spoke Tatar, Uyghur, Mandarin Chinese, Russian, Turkish and some Arabic and acted as the interpreter for Yang Zengxin, the leader of Xinjiang at the time. Jadid leader Ismail Gasprinski inspired Burhan.

In 1929, he was sent to Weimar Germany by Xinjiang's next leader Jin Shuren and studied political-economy in Berlin. He returned to Xinjiang in 1933 and held a number of roles in the provincial government including manager of a land development company. He played a key role in the Xinjiang Nationalities Congress of 1934. At this Congress, the ethnonym Uyghur was adopted to describe the majority Turkic Muslims in the oases of the Tarim Basin.

=== Republic of China ===
In 1935, he became a member of the Xinjiang People's Anti-Imperialist Association, initially serving as deputy minister of the Popular Department, and subsequently as acting vice-chairman of the Association in 1936. During this time, he met Yu Xiusong, a CCP member and the chairman of the Association, and began to study the history of the CPC's struggles, as well as its principles and objectives.

In 1937, he was dispatched by the next governor, Sheng Shicai, to the Soviet Union to serve as a consular official in the border district of Zaysan. The following year, he was recalled by Sheng and imprisoned until 1944. While in prison, Burhan wrote an Uyghur-Chinese-Russian dictionary and translated Sun Yat-sen's Three People's Principles into Uyghur.

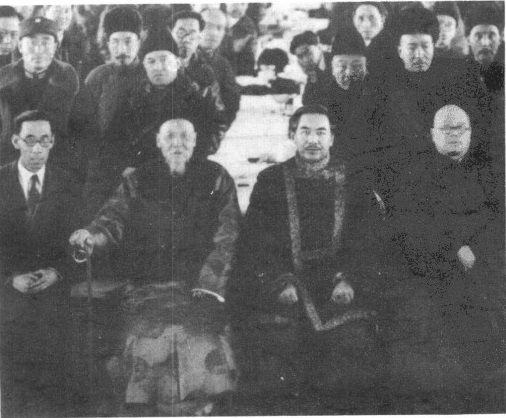
Burhan (2nd row, 2nd from the left) at the founding of the Association for the Advancement of Han Culture in Xinjiang in 1937, chaired by the governor Sheng Shicai (1st row, 3rd from left).

He was released by Wu Zhongxin, the Chinese Nationalist official who replaced Sheng Shicai. In 1946, Burhan became the vice-chairman of a provincial coalition government formed between the Chinese Nationalists and the revolutionaries who had founded the Second East Turkestan Republic (Second ETR) in the "Three Districts". He was considered a political moderate between the Nationalist Chinese and Second ETR members of the coalition.

In 1947, Burhan was transferred to Nanjing and became an official in the central government under Chiang Kai-shek. Later that year, he led a Xinjiang performance troupe to Taiwan and toured Keelung, Taipei, Taichung, and Kaoshiung. The tour came shortly after the February 28 Incident, which left many islanders hostile to mainlanders. Burhan gave speeches that appealed to national unity.

In 1948, he returned to Xinjiang and became the president of the Xinjiang Academy, the precursor to the Xinjiang University. He favored Chinese nationalism and disagreed with Turkic nationalist positions of Muhammad Amin Bughra. In January 1949, he replaced Masud Sabri as the chairman of Xinjiang Provincial Government. Sabri was anti-Soviet and opposed the Soviet-backed Ehmetjan Qasimi, who was the vice-chairman of the provincial government. He helped stabilize the province's finances, which was ravaged by the spread of inflation throughout Nationalist China, by restoring the local currency. Anti-Soviet sentiment was espoused by Isa Yusuf Alptekin while Pro Soviet sentiment was espoused by Burhan. The Soviets were angered by Isa.

In September of that year, he negotiated with Deng Liqun, the Chinese Communist representative sent by Mao Zedong to the province during the waning days of the Chinese Civil War. On 26 September, Burhan joined Nationalist general Tao Zhiyue in announcing the surrender of the province to the People's Liberation Army, paving the way for the "peaceful liberation" of Xinjiang. A week later, the People's Republic of China (PRC) was founded in Beijing.

=== People's Republic of China ===
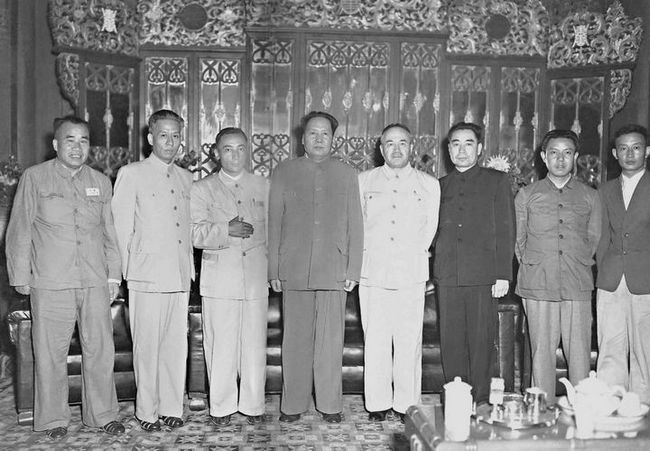
Gathering of Chinese Communist leaders in Beijing in June 1950. From left to right: Zhu De, Liu Shaoqi, Seypidin Azizi, Mao Zedong, Burhan, Zhou Enlai, Deng Liqun and Delin (Sibo translator of Seypidin).

On 17 December 1949, the Xinjiang Provincial People's Government was established, and Burhan became the chairman. Seypidin was the deputy chairman. He was introduced to the Chinese Communist Party by Wang Zhen and Xu Liqing at the end of the year. In December, he joined the Northwest Military and Political Committee, assumed the role of Chairman of the Xinjiang Provincial People's Government, and became President of the Xinjiang Academy. He chaired the First Committee of the Whole of the Xinjiang Provincial People's Government, which ratified the "Current Policy of Governance of the Xinjiang Provincial People's Government Committee." In 1952, he headed the preparatory committee to create the Xinjiang Uyghur Autonomous Region (XUAR).

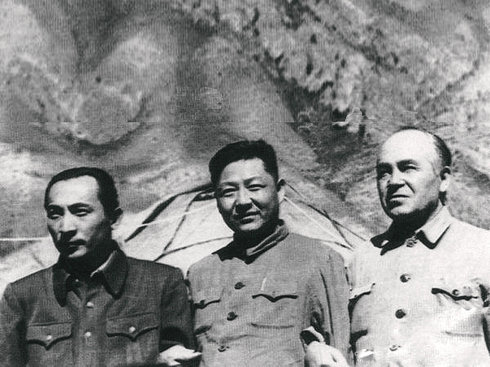
Burhan (right) with Xi Zhongxun (middle) and Seypidin Azizi (left) in July 1952, after successfully quelling the insurgency of Osman Batur.

Burhan was a co-founder and the first chairman of the Islamic Association of China. In this capacity, he became an able diplomat in the PRC's outreach to the Islamic world. In February 1956, he led a cultural and religious delegation on a tour of Egypt, Sudan, Ethiopia, Syria and Lebanon. As a direct result of his diplomatic work, Egypt under President Gamal Abdel Nasser in May 1956 became the first country in Middle East to recognize the PRC and sever ties with the Republic of China on Taiwan. It was the first country to recognize Beijing in six years and the recognition broke the diplomatic blockade imposed by the West. In July, he returned to the region leading China's hajj mission to Saudi Arabia, where he met King Saud and visited King Hussein of Jordan, though neither country had diplomatic relations with the PRC. On the same trip, he also met with President Nazim al-Kudsi of Syria and Amir Muhammad al-Badr of North Yemen. Both countries switched their recognition to the PRC in 1956.

On 4 November 1956, Burhan and Hu Yaobang, Guo Moruo helped lead a massive public rally and parade in Beijing with over 400,000 people in Tiananmen Square to support Egypt and denounce Anglo-French imperialism in the Suez Crisis. In the spring of 1959, he led a delegation to Iraq to support Prime Minister Abd al-Karim Qasim who had overthrown the Iraqi monarchy the previous year and founded a pro-socialist republic. He assumed the presidency of Xinjiang University in October 1960.

In February 1962, he served as the director of the Institute of Ethnic Studies at the Chinese Academy of Sciences. In April, he assumed the role of vice-president of the Asian-African Society of China. Following the Yi–Ta incident in Xinjiang in June–July, he was instructed to return to Xinjiang to aid the CCP Xinjiang Autonomous Region in managing the incident's repercussions.

Burhan supervised Chinese Muslim participation in the hajj until the Cultural Revolution, when he was accused of being a collaborator and a foreigner, and imprisoned for eight years. In January 1980, he assumed the presidency of the China Turkic Language Research Society (Chinese: 中国突厥语研究会); in March, he was rehabilitated and reinstated as a CCP member; in April, he was appointed honorary president of the Islamic Association of China; in August, he was elected honorary president of the China Ethnic Ancient Texts and Writings Research Society (Chinese: 中国民族古文字研究会); and in September, he was co-opted as a vice-chairman of the Chinese People's Political Consultative Conference (CPPCC), and then served as a vice-chairman of the second, third, fifth, sixth and seventh Chinese People's Political Consultative Conference National Committee. His memoir, Fifty Years in Xinjiang (Chinese: 《新疆五十年》) was published in 1984.

In 1985, to support the return of the critically endangered Père David's deer to China, Burhan helped found and chair the China Milu Foundation, now known as the China Biodiversity Conservation and Green Development Foundation.

He died on 27 August 1989 in Beijing and is buried in Ürümqi Revolutionary Martyrs Cemetery, the foothills of the Tian Shan in Xinjiang.

Political offices
Preceded by none	Co-Vice Chairman of the Xinjiang Provincial Coalition Government (along with Ehmetjan Qasimi); 1946–1947	Succeeded by Abdul Kerim Han Maksum
Preceded by Masud Sabri	Chairman of the Xinjiang Provincial Coalition Government; Jan.–Dec. 1949	Succeeded by none
New title	Chairman of the Xinjiang Provincial People's Government; Dec. 1949 – 1955	Next: Seypidin Azizi as Chairman of the XUAR People's Committee
