= Reshide Khanum =

Chinese politician (1912–1990)

- 拉希达·卡努姆; رەشىدە خانۇم
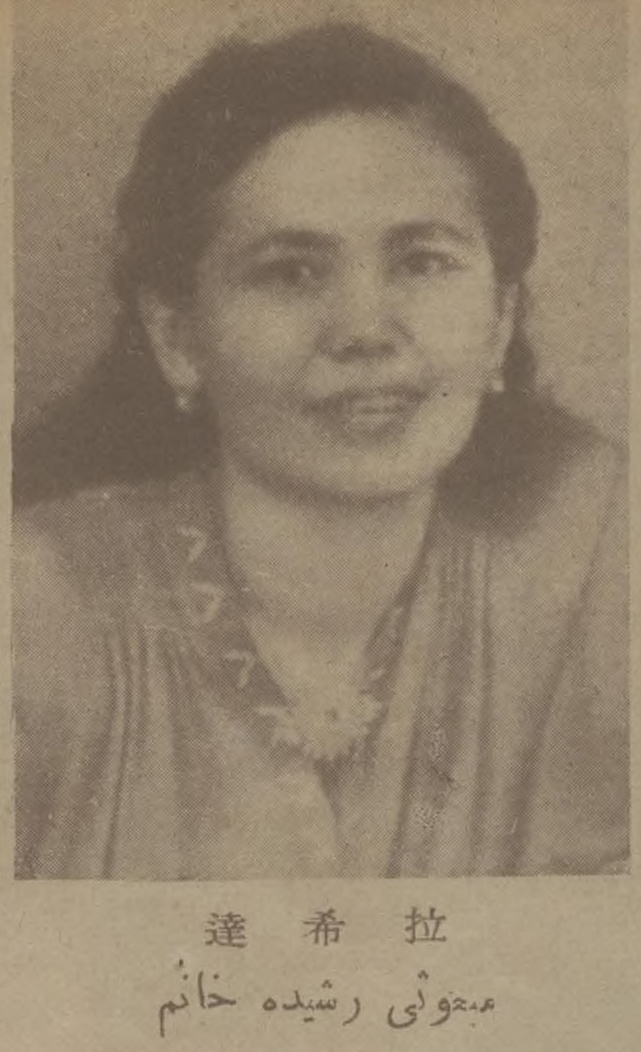

Member of the Legislative Yuan
- In office 1948–1951
- Succeeded by: Wang Xuechao
- Constituency: Education Association

Personal details
- Born: 1912
- Died: 26 March 1990 (aged 77–78) Beijing, China
- Party: Chinese Communist Party (joined 1985)
- Spouse: Burhan Shahidi

Chinese name
- Simplified Chinese: 拉希达·卡努姆
- Traditional Chinese: 拉希達·卡努姆
Transcriptions
Standard Mandarin
- Hanyu Pinyin: Lāxīdá Kǎnǔmǔ

Uyghur name
- Uyghur: رەشىدە خانۇم
Transcriptions
- Latin Yëziqi: Reshide Xanum
- SASM/GNC: Räshidä Khanum
- Siril Yëziqi: Рәшидә Ханум

Reshide Khanum (Note: simplified Chinese: 拉希达·卡努姆; traditional Chinese: 拉希達·卡努姆; pinyin: Lāxīdá Kǎnǔmǔ; Uyghur: رەشىدە خانۇم, romanized: Reshide Xanum, Chagatai alphabet: رشیده خانُم) (1912 – 26 March 1990) was a Chinese politician who was among the first group of women to be elected to the Legislative Yuan of the Republic of China in 1948. A Uyghur from the far-western Yining County, she served as a representative of Xinjiang Province.

== Biography ==
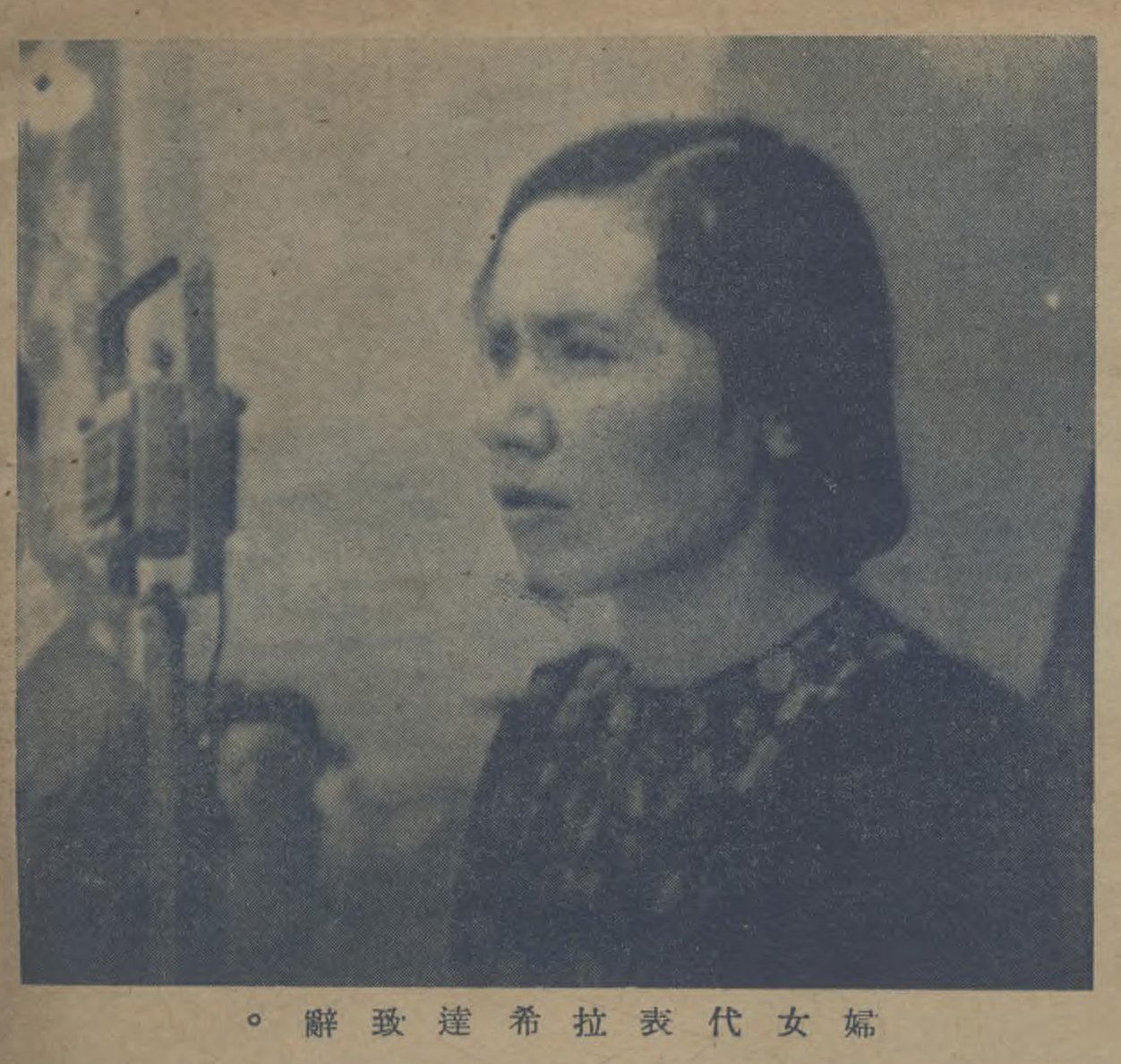
Reshide speaking at a "peace conference" in Dihua (Ürümqi) in 1947

Reshide was from Yining County in Xinjiang. She attended Tashkent Normal University of Technology in the Soviet Union, graduating in 1933. In 1937 she began working at the Xinjiang Consulate in Zaisan, a border town in Soviet Kazakhstan. After returning to China, she worked as a middle school teacher and headteacher. She also became deputy director of the Xinjiang Women's Federation, joined the Kuomintang, and married Burhan Shahidi, a prominent Chinese Tatar politician.

In the 1948 election to the Legislative Yuan, ten seats were elected by the Education Association, of which two were reserved for women. Reshide was chosen to fill one of the two women's seats, becoming one of the first women to enter the Chinese parliament. After the Chinese Civil War, she became deputy head of the Children's Welfare Department of the All-China Women's Federation, served as a member of the All-China Women's Federation Presidium, and was a delegate to the second to seventh National Committee of the Chinese People's Political Consultative Conference. A member of the standing committee of the Islamic Association of China, she joined the Chinese Communist Party in 1985.

She died in Beijing in March 1990.
