= Mahinur Qasimi =

Chinese politician (1929–2021)

- 玛依努尔·哈斯木; ماھىنۇر قاسىمى

Mayor of Yining
- In office 1952–19??

Director, Women's Federation of Xinjiang
- In office 1953–19??

Member of the National People's Congress
- In office 1959–19??

Member of the Standing Committee of the 7th National People's Congress
- In office 1988–1993

Vice Chair of the All-China Women's Federation
- In office 1980s–1990s

Personal details
- Born: 15 August 1929: Korgas County, Xinjiang Province, Republic of China (Note: Some sources state her birthplace as Panfilov District, Kazakh SSR, Soviet Union.)
- Died: 28 February 2021 (aged 91)
- Party: Chinese Communist Party
- Spouse: Ehmetjan Qasimi (m. 1945; died 1949)
- Children: 2
- Known for: Women's rights activism; widow of Ehmetjan Qasimi

Chinese name
- Simplified Chinese: 玛依努尔·哈斯木
- Traditional Chinese: 瑪依努爾·哈斯木
Transcriptions
Standard Mandarin
- Hanyu Pinyin: Mǎyīnǔ'ěr Hāsīmù

Uyghur name
- Uyghur: ماھىنۇر قاسىمى
Transcriptions
- Latin Yëziqi: Mahinur Qasimi

Mahinur Qasimi (Note: Other transliterations include Maynor or Mah-e-Noor, and Kasimi or Qasim.; Chinese: 玛依努尔·哈斯木; pinyin: Mǎyīnǔ'ěr Hāsīmù; Uyghur: ماھىنۇر قاسىمى, romanized: Mahinur Qasimi) (15 August 1929 – 28 February 2021) was a Chinese politician active in Xinjiang. She was an ethnic Uyghur and the widow of Ehmetjan Qasimi, a prominent Uyghur revolutionary.

== Early life ==
Mahinur, born in 1929, was a native of Korgas County in the Ili District of northwest Xinjiang. Some official sources list her birthplace as the neighbouring Panfilov District of the Kazakh SSR in the Soviet Union, while others say she was indeed born in Korgas County. Her mother died when she was one year old and she worked as a child instead of attending school. She married Ehmetjan Qasimi, a leader of the Second East Turkestan Republic (ETR), in Yining on 15 January 1945, and became his secretary. The couple had a son and a daughter. In 1948, after the ETR leadership agreed with the Nationalist Chinese government to form a coalition government in Xinjiang, Mahinur became a standing committee member of the Women's Committee of the Union to Protect Peace and Democracy in Xinjiang. After her husband died on 27 August 1949, in an airplane crash in the Soviet Union en route to Beijing to attend the founding of the People's Republic of China, Mahinur remained active in public life.

== Public service ==
In 1951, she became the deputy director of the Women's Federation in the Ili Special Direct. In 1952, she became the mayor of Yining and joined the Chinese Communist Party. In 1953, she became the deputy director of the General Office of the Xinjiang Provincial Government and the director of the Women's Federation in Xinjiang. She was a delegate to the Second Chinese People's Political Consultative Conference, elected in 1954, and the Second and Third National People's Congress, elected in 1959 and 1964.

She was purged and persecuted during the Cultural Revolution and then rehabilitated thereafter. In the 1980s and 1990s, she served as a vice chair of the 4th, 5th, 6th and 7th All-China Women's Federation, and was elected to the Standing Committee of the Seventh National People's Congress in 1988. She has been a prominent advocate of women and children's rights. She retired in 2003 and has continued to speak at women's rights events.

== Memoirs ==
Her memoir of her husband, Remembering Ehmetijan 《回忆阿合买提江》, was published in 2011. A Pictorial Memoir of the Wife of Ehmetijan Qasimi, Leader of the Three Districts Revolution 《三区革命头号领导人阿合买提江夫人的回忆图册》 was published in October 2002.
