= Isa Alptekin =

Uyghur politician (1901–1995)

Isa Yusuf Alptekin
- ئەيسا يۈسۈپ ئالپتېكىن
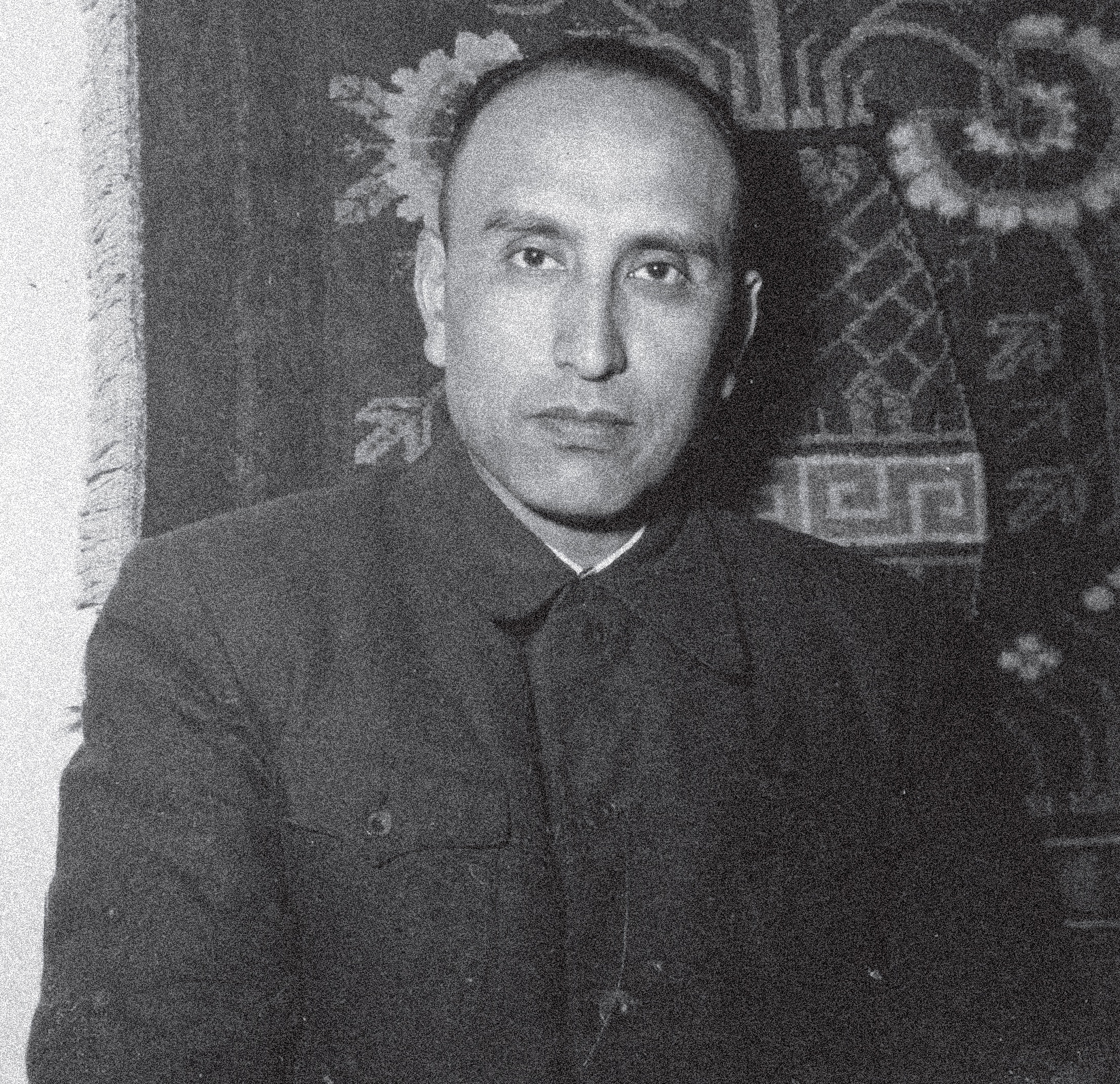
- Alptekin c. 1948

Senior Advisor of the Border Affairs Department of the Ministry of National Defense of the Republic of China
- In office 1932–1949

Member of the Legislative Yuan for Xinjiang Province
- In office 1936–1949

Personal details
- Born: 1901 Kashgar, Qing dynasty
- Died: 1995 (aged 93–94) Istanbul, Turkey
- Relatives: Erkin Alptekin (son)
- Profession: Politician

Isa Alptekin

Uyghur name
- Uyghur: ئەيسا يۈسۈپ ئالپتېكىن

Chinese name
- Traditional Chinese: 艾薩·玉素甫·阿布甫泰肯
- Simplified Chinese: 艾萨·玉素甫·阿布甫泰肯
Transcriptions
Standard Mandarin
- Hanyu Pinyin: Àisà Yùsùfǔ Ābùfǔtàikěn
- Wade–Giles: Ai^{4}-sa^{4} Yü^{4}-su^{4}-fu^{3} A^{1}-pu^{4}-fu^{3}-t'ai^{4}-k'en^{3}

Turkish name
- Turkish: İsa Yusuf Alptekin

Isa Yusuf Alptekin (Uyghur: ئەيسا يۈسۈپ ئالپتېكىن; 1901 – 17 December 1995) was an Uyghur politician who served in the Chinese Nationalist government and opposed both the First East Turkistan Republic and the Second East Turkestan Republic. When Xinjiang came under Chinese communist control in 1949, Alptekin went into exile and became an ultra-nationalist and pan-Turkic separatist.

== Biography ==
He was born in 1901 in Yengisar County, Kashgar, Qing dynasty. Aliptekin began his political career working as a translator and interpreter at the Chinese consulate in Andijan from 1926 to 1928. While working in Andijan, Alptekin met with Uyghur merchants who sought his counsel on whether to agree with Soviet plans to arm Uyghurs and liberate East Turkistan from Chinese control. Alptekin immediately notified the Chinese consul of the plot. In 1928, Aliptekin was praised for his work and tasked with escorting a Chinese diplomat who had fallen very ill (Peking). In the fall of 1928, Alptekin was posted to Tashkent where he worked as a lackey, interpreter, and translator for the Chinese consul until May 1932. In 1932, Alptekin was sent to Nanjing and was appointed as an advisor in the Republic of China's Defense Ministry's Border Affairs Department.

Alptekin opposed the First East Turkestan Republic which existed in Kashgar from November 12, 1933, to April 16, 1934. In Nanjing, under the direction of the Chinese government, Alptekin's "Chini Turkistan Avazi" journal accused the British government of organizing a revolt in East Turkistan in a bid to seize it. Initially, the republic was named the "Turkic Islamic Republic of East Turkestan" (TIRET), representing the multi-national staff of its government, which included Uyghurs, Kazakhs, and Kyrgyz. Its anti-Hui, anti-Han, and anti-communist policies were declared in its declaration of independence, its basic Islamic principles, and its constitution. On September 18, 1936, Aliptekin was "elected" as a member of the Chinese National Assembly (Legislative Yuan).

He stayed in Nanjing and then fled to Chongqing with the Chinese government when the Empire of Japan invaded. He lived there along with several other Uyghurs such as Masud Sabri. In order to gain sympathy for the Chinese War against Japan, the countries of Egypt, Syria, and Turkey were visited by Hui Muslim Ma Fuliang (馬賦良) and Uyghur Muslim Isa Yusuf Alptekin in 1939. They contacted Muhammad Amin Bughra when they also went to Afghanistan in 1940, asking him to come to Chongqing, the capital of the Kuomintang regime. The Kuomintang arranged for Bughra's release after the British had arrested Bughra for spying. Kuomintang Muslim publications used Isa and Bughra as editors.

The bombardment of Chinese Muslims by the warplanes of the Japanese was reported in the newspapers of Syria. Afghanistan, Iran, Iraq, Syria, and Lebanon were all toured by the delegation. The Foreign Minister, Prime Minister, and President of Turkey met with the Chinese Muslim delegation after they came via Egypt in May 1939. Gandhi and Jinnah met with the Hui Ma Fuliang and Uyghur Isa Alptekin as they denounced Japan.

Ma Fuxliang, Isa Alptekin, Wang Zengshan, Xue Wenbo, and Lin Zhongming all went to Egypt to denounce Japan in front of the Arab and Islamic worlds. China was supported by Alptekin during the Japanese invasion.

Isa returned to Xinjiang, and he opposed the Second East Turkestan Republic in northern Xinjiang during the Ili Rebellion, claiming that it was a Soviet Communist puppet state of Stalin. Instead, he worked for the Chinese Kuomintang regime of Zhang Zhizhong. There were 3 Effendis, (Üch Äpändi) (ئۈچ ئەپەندى) Aisa Alptekin, Memtimin Bughra (Muhammad Amin Bughra), and Masud Sabri. The Second East Turkestan Republic attacked them as Kuomintang "puppets".

He asked Ma Bufang on whether Chiang Kai-shek and the Chinese government would allow an independent Islamic state in southern Xinjiang to counter the Communists and the Soviet-backed Second East Turkestan Republic, but Ma Bufang did not bother with this request. Instead, Ma fled in an American CIA airplane with several million dollars in gold as the Chinese Red Army approached Qinghai. Ma then fled to the Kuomintang-controlled island of Taiwan, then to Egypt.

Alptekin fled after the Communist takeover of Xinjiang through the Himalayas, reaching Ladakh in Indian-controlled Kashmir and going into exile in Turkey. In 1954, he and Muhammad Amin Bughra went to Taiwan to try to persuade the Kuomintang government of the Republic of China to drop its claims to Xinjiang. Their demand was rejected and Taiwan affirmed that it claimed Xinjiang as "an integral part of China".

Members of the US Congress met with Alptekin in 1970. Alptekin met with the ultra-nationalist Pan-Turkic leader Alparslan Türkeş. The marriages between Muslim (Uyghur) women and Han Chinese men infuriated him. Anti-Soviet sentiment was espoused by Isa while pro-Soviet sentiment was espoused by Burhan. The Soviets were angered by Isa. Alptekin also voiced anti-Armenian rhetoric while he was in Turkey and claimed that innocent Turkish Muslims were massacred by Armenians.

Isa Yusuf Alptekin was the father of Erkin Alptekin. During Alptekin's exile in Turkey, where he received great support from Pan-Turkic elements in the Government of Turkey, the PRC government denounced him for continuing his "Xinjiang independence activities", and for trying to overthrow the "socialist system". When he died there in 1995, over a thousand people allegedly attended his funeral, and he was buried in Topkapı Cemetery, next to the mausoleums of two former Turkish leaders, Adnan Menderes and Turgut Özal. In 1995, a park was dedicated to Alptekin in the Blue Mosque section in Istanbul, along with a memorial for martyrs of the late East Turkestan Independence Movement. The high-profile nature of the dedication, including the attendance of the Turkish President, Prime Minister, chairman of parliament, and others, enraged China. It denounced Turkey for meddling in its 'internal affairs', and the Turkish state department requested the closing of the park, but domestic constituencies refused.

== Criticism ==
Several Uyghur intellectuals regard Isa Alpetekin as a traitor to the national cause, such as General Mahmut Muhiti who expressed his disdain for Alptekin in his 1938 letter published in Yash Turkistan (Young Turkestan) newspaper.
