= Masud Sabri =

Uyghur politician of the ROC (1886–1952)

- 麥斯武德·沙比爾; مەسئۇت سابرى
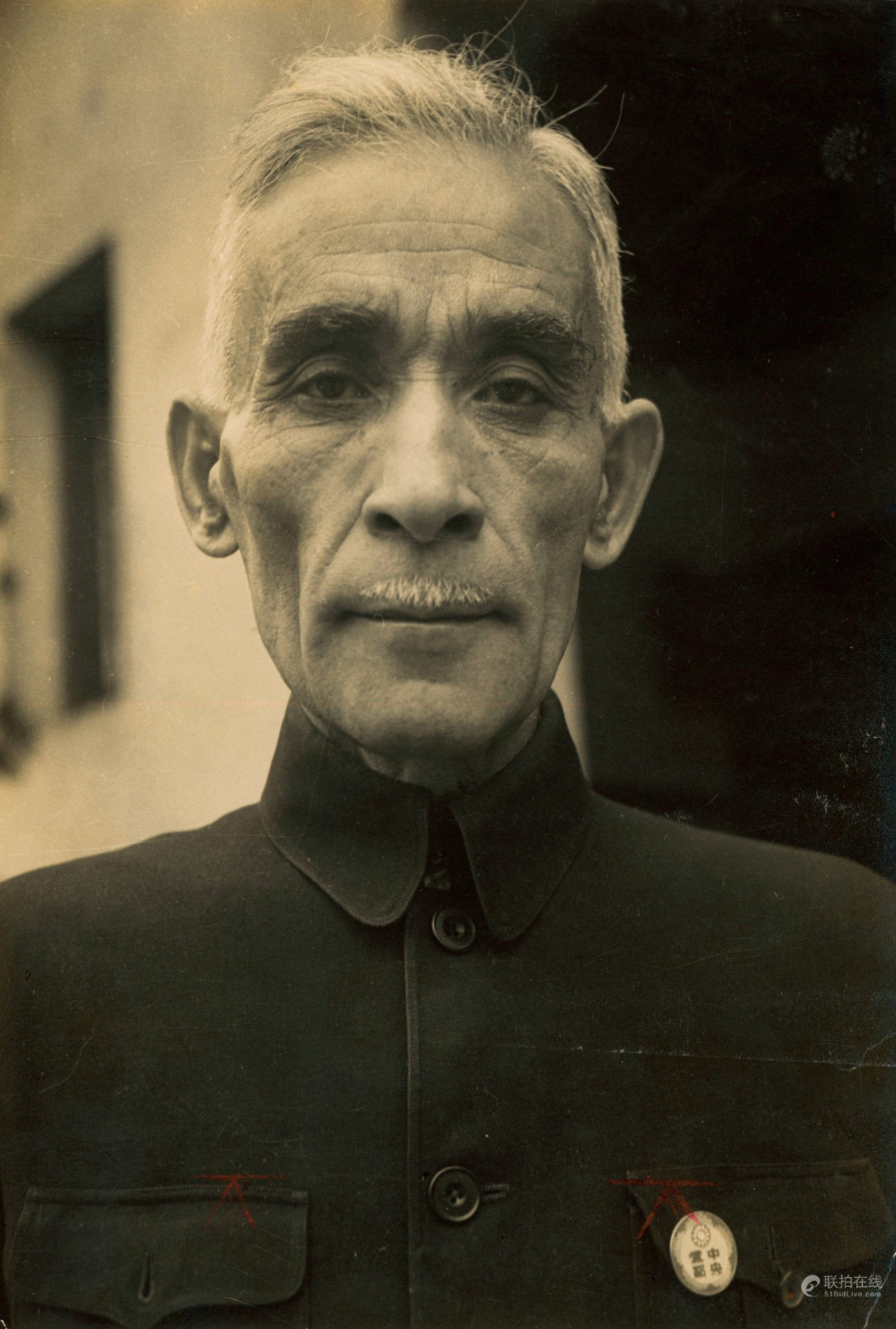

Governor of Xinjiang
- In office 21 May 1947 – 31 December 1948
- Preceded by: Zhang Zhizhong
- Succeeded by: Burhan Shahidi

Personal details
- Born: 1886 Ili, Xinjiang, Qing China
- Died: 1952 (aged 65–66) Xinjiang, People's Republic of China
- Party: CC Clique of the Kuomintang
- Education: University of Istanbul

Military service
- Allegiance: Republic of China

Chinese name
- Traditional Chinese: 麥斯武德·沙比爾
- Simplified Chinese: 麦斯武德·沙比尔
Transcriptions
Standard Mandarin
- Hanyu Pinyin: Màisīwǔdé Shābì'ěr

Uyghur name
- Uyghur: مەسئۇت سابرى
Transcriptions
- Latin Yëziqi: Mes'ut Sabri

Masud Sabri (Note: Chinese: 麥斯武德·沙比爾; pinyin: Màisīwǔdé Shābì'ěr; Uyghur: مەسئۇت سابرى, romanized: Mes'ut Sabri, Chagatai alphabet: مسعود صبري) (1886–1952) was a politician of the Republic of China who was appointed by Chiang Kai-shek as the first Uyghur (Note: As a pan-Turkist, Sabri did not consider himself Uyghur or approve of the term.) governor of Xinjiang. He served as governor during the Ili Rebellion. Sabri received education at Kulja and Istanbul and was a Pan-Turkist.

== Education ==
After attending University of Istanbul and learning medicine, Sabri returned to Xinjiang to become a pharmacist.

== Career ==
Governor of Xinjiang Yang Zengxin jailed Masud Sabri for pan-Turkist activities and then deported him from the province.

Masud supported the First East Turkestan Republic while based at Aqsu with Mahmud Sijan. After it was crushed by the 36th Division (National Revolutionary Army), Masud fled to British India and then to Nanking, where he joined the Kuomintang Republic of China government. The Central Military Academy and Central University accepted some of his relatives as students in Nanking after he joined the Central Executive Committee of the Kuomintang.

In 1942, Masud Sabri served as one of 36 members of the State Council (Chinese National Political Council) and one of two Muslim members along with the Hui general Ma Lin.

Bai Chongxi, the Defence Minister of China and a Muslim, was considered for being appointed Governor of Xinjiang but the position was given to Masud Sabri. He replaced Zhang Zhizhong. Ehmetjan Qasim, the Communist Uyghur Ili leader, repeatedly demanded that Masud Sabri be sacked as governor.

Masud Sabri was an opponent of the Soviet-sponsored Second East Turkistan Republic in Ili during the Ili Rebellion, opposing all efforts to negotiate with Ehmetjan Qasim along with others like the Hui Wang Tseng-shan who was the KMT commissioner of Civil Affairs in the Xinjiang Coalition Government from 1946–47. Masud Sabri was a CC Clique member, as was the Tatar Burhan Shahidi and the Han general Wu Zhongxin. He led the Xinjiang coalition government from 1948-1949 Masud Sabri formed a group of pan turkists with Muhammad Amin Bughra and Isa Yusuf Alptekin to join the Kuomintang Republic of China coalition government in Xinjiang, opposing the Uyghur Communist Ili regime in the Second East Turkestan Republic.There were 3 Effendis, (Üch Äpändi) (ئۈچ ئەپەندى) Aisa Alptekin, Memtimin Bughra (Muhammad Amin Bughra), and Masud Sabri. The Second East Turkestan Republic attacked them as Kuomintang "puppets". Ehmetjan Qasim's government in Ili attacked Isa Yusuf Alptekin, Muhammad Amin Bughra, and Masud Sabri as supporters of the Kuomintang and puppets of imperialism.

Masud Sabri and fellow Jadidist East Turkestan Independence activist Muhammad Amin Bughra rejected the Soviet imposition of the name "Uyghur people" upon the Turkic people of Xinjiang. They wanted instead the name "Turkic ethnicity" Chinese: 突厥族; pinyin: Tūjuézú to be applied to their people. Masud Sabri viewed the Hui people as Muslim Han Chinese and separate from his own people. The names "Türk" or "Türki" in particular were demanded by Bughra as the real name for his people. He criticised Sheng Shicai for his designation of Turkic Muslims into different ethnicities which he believed would sow disunion among Turkic Muslims.

In 1948 Sabri turned down the proposal of being appointed ambassador to Iran from China.

In January 1949, Burhan Shahidi succeeded Masud Sabri as the chairman of Xinjiang Provincial Government.

The Chinese Communist Party (CCP) placed him under detention and imprisoned him in 1951. He died in 1952, still incarcerated. Alternatively, according to Xinjiang and Ukraine specialist Sean R. Roberts, the CCP had Sabri executed in 1951.
