= Xinjiang People's Anti-Imperialist Association =

Ruling party in Xinjiang from 1935 to 1942

Xinjiang People's Anti-Imperialist Association 新疆民眾反帝聯合會
- President: Sheng Shicai
- Founder: Sheng Shicai
- Founded: 1 August 1935
- Dissolved: April 1942
- Headquarters: Dihua, Xinjiang
- Newspaper: Anti-Imperialist War Front
- Youth wing: Xinjiang's Youth
- Women's wing: Xinjiang's Women
- Membership (1939): 10,000
- Ideology: Anti-imperialism; Marxism–Leninism; Stalinism; Pro-Soviet Union
- Political position: Far-left

Party flag

Xinjiang People's Anti-Imperialist Association
- Traditional Chinese: 新疆民眾反帝聯合會
- Simplified Chinese: 新疆民众反帝联合会
Transcriptions
Standard Mandarin
- Hanyu Pinyin: Xīnjiāng Mínzhòng Fǎn Dì Liánhé Huì
- Wade–Giles: Min^{2}-chung^{4} Fan^{3} Ti^{4} Lien^{2}-ho^{2} Hui^{4}

The Xinjiang People's Anti-Imperialist Association (Note: Also known as the "Anti-Imperialist Federation", "Anti-Imperialist Society" or "Anti-Imperialist Union".) (Chinese: 新疆民眾反帝聯合會; pinyin: Xīnjiāng Mínzhòng Fǎn Dì Liánhé Huì) was a political party in Xinjiang, China, during the rule of Sheng Shicai from 1935 to 1942.

== History ==
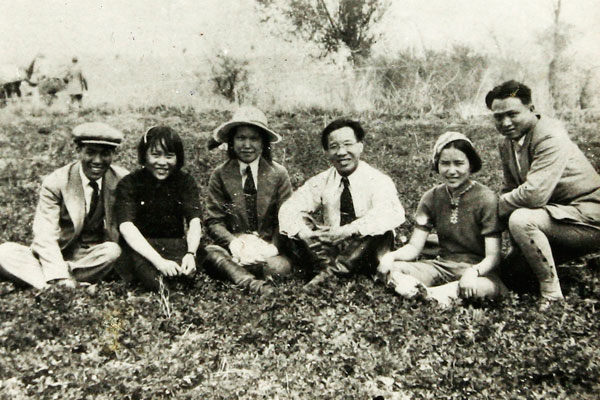
Yu Xiusong and members of the Xinjiang People's Anti-Imperialist Association, May 1937.

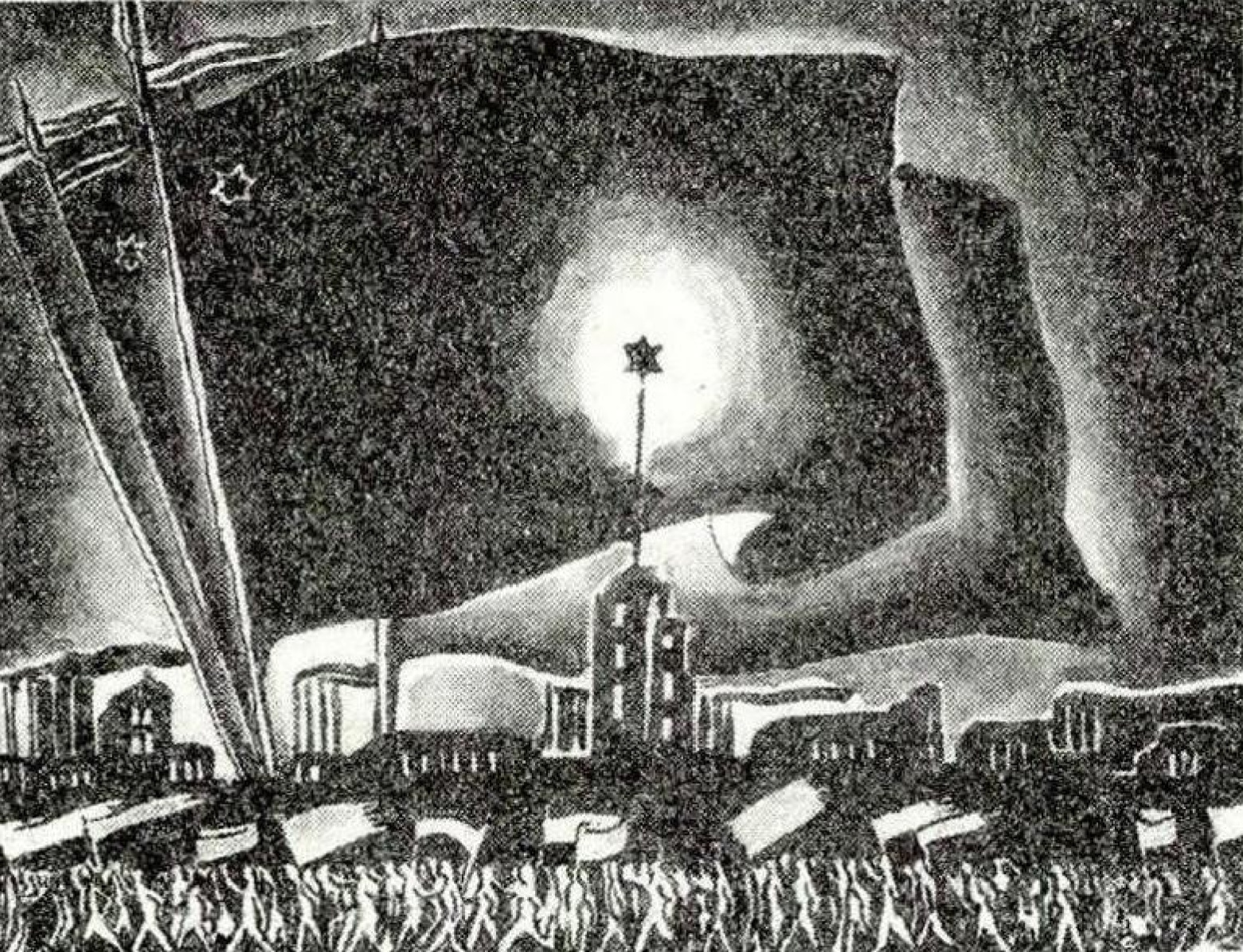
A propaganda illustration of the Anti-Imperialist Association's flag.

The People's Anti-Imperialist Association was founded by Sheng Shicai in Ürümqi on 1 August 1935. The propaganda outlet of the Association was the Anti-Imperialist War Front. The Sinkiang's Youth and the Sinkiang's Women served as the Association's youth and women's wing, respectively. The Association saw a large increase in membership. In 1935 it had 2,489 members, in 1937 the membership grew to 5,281, and in 1939 the Association's membership rose to 10,000. The membership was nationally diverse, and included Han, Hui and various Turkic peoples.

The ideology of the People's Anti-Imperialist Association was the "Six Great Policies", issued by Sheng in December 1934. The policies guaranteed his previously enacted "Great Eight-Point Manifesto". They included "anti-imperialism, friendship with the Soviet Union, racial and national equality, clean government, peace and reconstruction". Sheng referred to them as "a skilful, vital application of Marxism, Leninism, and Stalinism in the conditions of the feudal society of economically and culturally backward Sinkiang". They served as the ideological basis of Sheng's rule. With the proclamation of the Six Great Policies, Sheng adopted a new flag with a six-pointed star to represent these policies.

With Sheng's rapprochement with the Central government, the Kuomintang spread throughout the province, replacing the People's Anti-Imperialist Association, which was disbanded in April 1942.
