= Ehmetjan Qasimi =

Uyghur politician (1914–1949)

- ئەخمەتجان قاسىمى; 阿合買提江·哈斯木
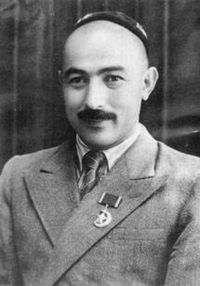

Minister of Foreign Affairs of the East Turkestan Republic
- In office November 1944 – 27 August 1949

Vice Chairman of the Coalition Government of Xinjiang Province
- In office 27 June 1946 – 12 August 1947

Personal details
- Born: 15 April 1914 Ghulja, Xinjiang, China
- Died: 27 August 1949 (aged 35) Kabansk, Russian SFSR, Soviet Union
- Spouse: Mahinur Qasimi (m. 1945)
- Profession: Politician

Uyghur name
- Uyghur: ئەخمەتجان قاسىمى
Transcriptions
- Latin Yëziqi: Exmetjan Qasimi
- Yengi Yeziⱪ: Əhmətjan Ⱪasimi
- SASM/GNC: Ähmätjan K̂asimi
- Siril Yëziqi: Әхмəтжан Касими

Chinese name
- Simplified Chinese: 阿合买提江·哈斯木
- Traditional Chinese: 阿合買提江·哈斯木
Transcriptions
Standard Mandarin
- Hanyu Pinyin: Āhémǎitíjiāng Hāsīmù
- Wade–Giles: A^{1}-he^{2}-mai^{3}-t'i^{2}-chiang^{1} Ha^{1}-szu^{1}-mu^{4}
- IPA: [áxɤ̌màɪtʰǐtɕjáŋ xásímû]

Ehmetjan Qasimi (Note: Also transliterated as Exmetjan, Ahmatjan, Ahmetjan, Ahmadjan, or Ahmad Jan; and Kasimi, Qasim, Kasim, or Kasimov.) (Note: Uyghur: ئەخمەتجان قاسىمى, romanized: Exmetjan Qasimi; Chinese: 阿合买提江·哈斯木; pinyin: Āhémǎitíjiāng Hāsīmù) (15 April 1914 – 27 August 1949) was a Uyghur politician and revolutionary who held several important positions in the governments of the Second East Turkestan Republic and the Republic of China's Xinjiang Province. He notably served as the vice chairman of the Coalition Government of Xinjiang Province.

Ehmetjan was born in Ghulja in 1914. He studied at the Communist University of the Toilers of the East, Moscow in 1936 and was a member of Communist Party of the Soviet Union. Ehmetjan was described as "Stalin's man", though the evidence for this description is circumstantial.

== Life and political career ==
Ehmetjan was born in Ghulja (Yining in Chinese) in 1914. He studied in the Soviet Union at the Communist University of the Toilers of the East, Moscow in 1936 and was a member of Communist Party of the Soviet Union. Ehmetjan was described as a "communist-minded progressive". Ehmetjan Russified his surname to "Kasimov" and became a member of the Communist Party of the Soviet Union.

He was a member of the governing council of the East Turkestan Republic, founded in three northwestern districts of Xinjiang during the Ili Rebellion in November 1944.The ETR was initially led by Elihan Tore, who favored forming a conservative Islamic government.

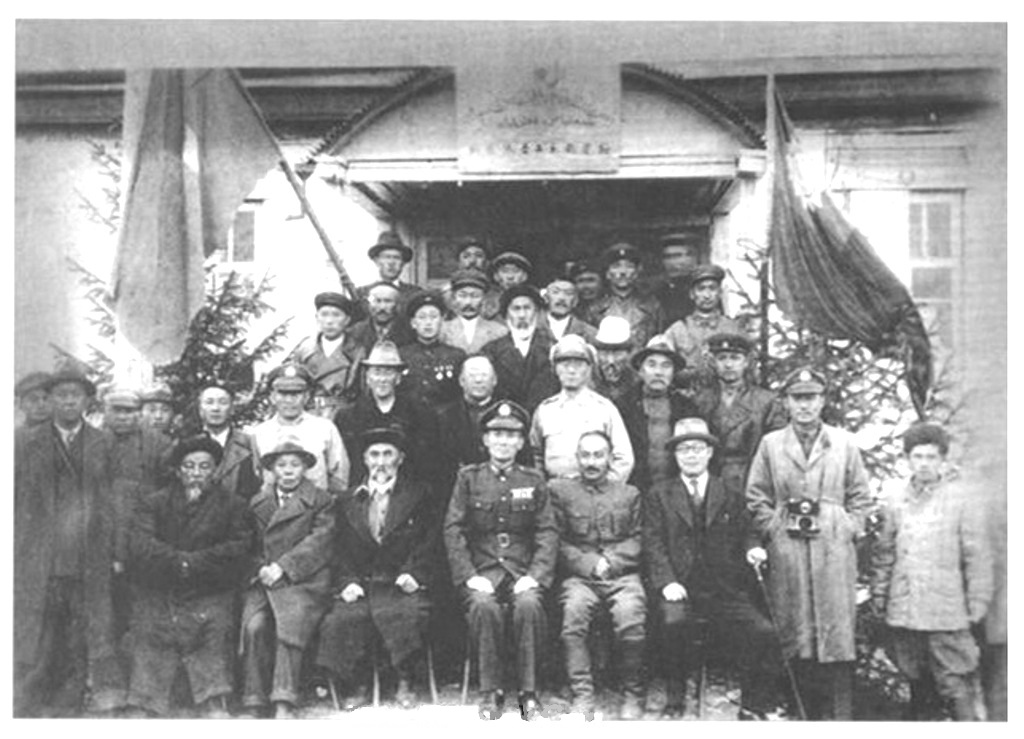
Representatives of the Coalition Government of Xinjiang Province, including Chairman Zhang Zhizhong (front row, 5th from right) and Vice Chairman Ehmetjan (front row, 4th from right)

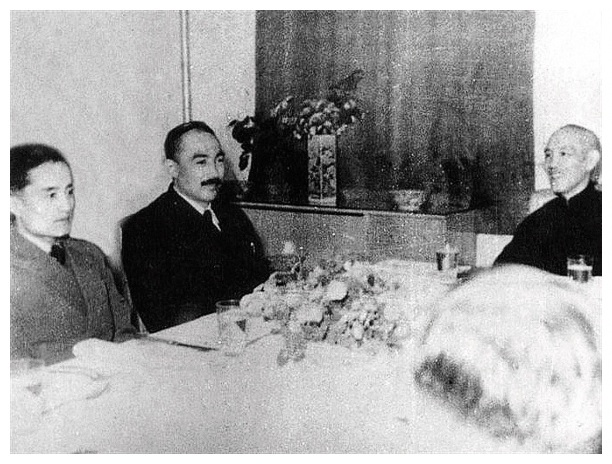
Ehmetjan with Abdukerim Abbasov and Chiang Kai-shek in Nanjing on 22 November 1946

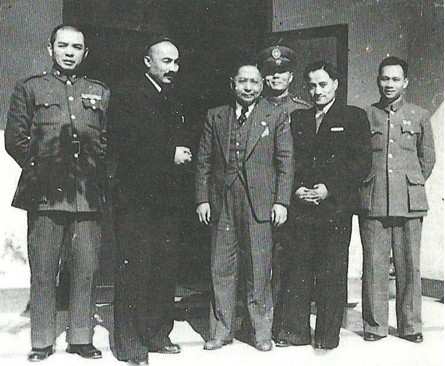
Ehmetjan with Abdukerim and Sun Fo, the son of Sun Yat-sen, in Nanjing on 24 November 1946

In June 1946, Ehmetjan tried to reach a political agreement with the Nationalist government leader Zhang Zhizhong to form a coalition government in Dihua (present day Ürümqi). The ETR was to be disbanded in name but as the Foreign Minister of the East Turkestan Republic, Ehmetjan called for unity and support for his government and rejected the coalition government. He explained that the people of East Turkestan had risen in rebellion only to secure their rights under the Chinese constitution. He led a delegation to the National Assembly in Nanjing to negotiate bi-lateral relations between ETR and the Republic of China.

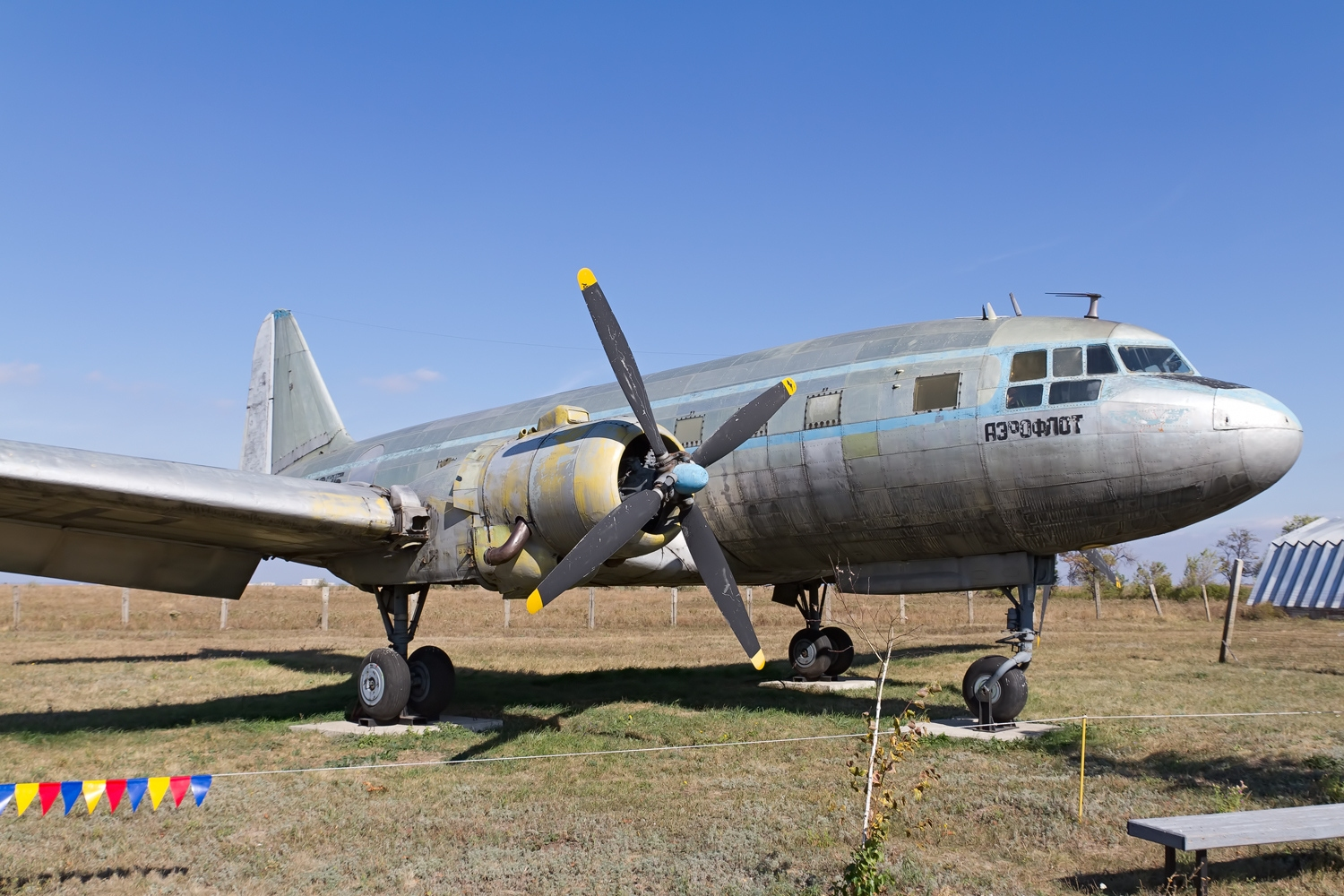
The same plane model Ehmetjan was killed in

In the summer of 1949, as Chinese Nationalists were losing the Chinese Civil War to the Chinese Communists, the Soviet Union planned for ETR leaders to switch sides. On 22 August 1949, Vasiliy Borisov, the Soviet Vice-Consul at Yining, accompanied ETR leadership in auto trip to USSR for urgent talks with Soviet officials about future of ETR, where they were told to cooperate with Chinese Communist Party. They were invited by CCP Chairman Mao Zedong to attend the 1st Chinese People's Political Consultative Conference in Beijing to prepare for the founding of the People's Republic of China. On 24 August 1949, Ehmetjan, Abdukerim Abbasov, Ishaq Beg Munonov, Dalelkhan Sugirbayev, Luo Zhi and other top ETR representatives (11 men in all) boarded a plane in Almaty, the capital of the Kazakh SSR, for Beijing. On 3 September, the Soviet Union informed Seypidin Azizi, another leader of the ETR, who was not on the flight that the plane had crashed near Lake Baikal en route to Beijing, killing all on board.

Seypidin later secured the role of regional Chairman of Xinjiang, a job he kept from 1955 to 1978, with a brief respite during the Cultural Revolution. News of plane crash and death of Ehmetjan was not publicly announced in Xinjiang until early December, after the People's Liberation Army had secured the region. The ETR was officially dissolved on 20 December 1949.

== Legacy ==
In the People's Republic of China, Ehmetjan is remembered as a fighter in the struggle against the Nationalist government. Among the Uyghurs and other Turkic inhabitants of East Turkistan he is remembered as a national hero and fighter who died defending the independence of East Turkistan. His remains were returned to China in April 1950 and later reburied in a memorial cemetery in Yining. The cemetery has a stele with calligraphy by Mao Zedong, praising Ehmetjan and the others who died with him for their contributions to the Chinese Civil War and mourning their death en route to the Inaugural Chinese People's Political Consultative Conference in Beijing.

In a 2021 documentary by the Chinese state–run CGTN news channel, a photograph of Ehmetjan wearing an ETR medal in a school textbook was cited as an example of Uyghur educators inserting separatist propaganda in educational materials. Australian historian of modern Chinese history David Brophy notes that this was despite Ehmetjan having "enjoyed relative protection as a historical figure" due to his leadership in the Three Districts Revolution, and the same photo having been used by Ehmetjan's late wife in her memoirs, albeit cropped above the medal.

== Family ==
Ehmetjan was married in January 1945 to Mahinur Qasimi, a native of Korgas County in Ili. The couple had a son and a daughter. In 1952, Mahinur became the mayor of Yining and joined the Chinese Communist Party. She later served as a member of Standing Committee of the National People's Congress and a vice chair of the All-China Women's Federation. She has been a prominent advocate of women and children's rights. Her memoir of her husband, Remembering Ehmetijan, was published in China in 2011.

== Bibliography ==
- Abdurakhman Abay, Ahmetjan Qasimi Haqqida Hikayilar, Urumqi: Xinjiang Peoples Publishing (1984)
- Benson, Linda (1990). The Ili Rebellion: the Moslem challenge to Chinese authority in Xinjiang, 1944-1949. M.E. Sharpe. ISBN 0-87332-509-5.
- Forbes, Andrew D. W. (1986). Warlords and Muslims in Chinese Central Asia: A Political History of Republican Sinkiang 1911-1949 (illustrated ed.). CUP Archive. ISBN 0521255147.
- Zordun Sabir, Anayurt, Almaty: Nash Mir (2006)
