= Xinjiang Province, Republic of China =

Former province of the Republic of China

Sinkiang Province 新疆省
- Province of China; Under Xinjiang Clique rule (1912–1933); Under Anti-Imperialist Federation party rule (1935–1942); Under coalition government (1946–1947)
- 1912–1992
- Flag Provincial Government Seal: 新疆省政府印

- Sinkiang Province (red) in the Republic of China (as claimed)
- Capital: Tihwa
- Government
  - Type: Military dictatorship (1912–1933); Xinjiang Anti-Imperialist Society aligned dictatorship (1935–1942); Coalition government (1946–1947); Provincial government (1944–1946; 1947–1949; 1950–1951); Government-in-exile (1951–1992)
- Governor
  - 1912–1928: Yang Zengxin
  - 1928–1933: Jin Shuren
  - 1933: Liu Wenlong
  - 1934–1940: Li Rong
  - 1940–1944: Sheng Shicai
  - 1944–1946: Wu Zhongxin
  - 1946–1947: Zhang Zhizhong
  - 1947–1948: Masud Sabri
  - 1948–1949: Burhan Shahidi
  - 1950–1971: Yulbars Khan
- Duban (Military Governor)
  - 1933–1944: Sheng Shicai
- History
  - Governor appointed: 18 May 1912
  - Kumul Rebellion: 1931–1934
  - Battle of Ürümqi: 1933
  - Soviet invasion: 1934
  - Islamic rebellion: 1937
  - Ili Rebellion: 1944–1946
  - Surrender to the People's Liberation Army: October 13, 1949 1949
  - Province dissolved: January 16, 1992
Preceded by
Xinjiang Province, Great Qing
Kumul Khanate
Succeeded by
Xinjiang Province, People's Republic of China
First East Turkestan Republic
Second East Turkestan Republic

Xinjiang Province (Chinese: 新疆省; pinyin: Xīnjiāng Shěng) or Sinkiang Province was a province of the Republic of China (ROC) from 1912 to 1992. Its existence was nominal after the ROC's defeat in the Chinese Civil War and the subsequent incorporation of Xinjiang into the People's Republic of China (PRC) in 1949. The provincial government relocated to Taipei and was reorganized as the Sinkiang Provincial Government Office (新疆省政府辦事處), but it was without administrative function. In the PRC, Xinjiang Province was replaced by the Xinjiang Uyghur Autonomous Region in 1955.

== Administration ==
The province inherited the borders of the Qing dynasty province, bordering Kansu, Tsinghai, the Mongol Area, Tibet Area and the countries Soviet Union, Afghanistan, India and Pakistan. The claimed boundaries of the province included all of today's Xinjiang and parts of Mongolia, Tajikistan, Afghanistan and Pakistan.

== History ==
In 1912, the Qing dynasty was replaced by the Republic of China. Yuan Dahua, the last Qing governor of Xinjiang, fled. One of his subordinates, Yang Zengxin, took control of the province and acceded in name to the Republic of China in March of the same year. Through Machiavellian politics and clever balancing of mixed ethnic constituencies, Yang maintained control over Xinjiang until his assassination in 1928 after the Northern Expedition of the Kuomintang.

The Kumul Rebellion and other rebellions arose against his successor Jin Shuren in the early 1930s throughout Xinjiang, involving Uyghurs, other Turkic groups, and Hui (Muslim) Chinese. Jin drafted White Russians to crush the revolt. In the Kashgar region on November 12, 1933, the short-lived self-proclaimed First East Turkistan Republic was declared. The Hui Kuomintang 36th Division (National Revolutionary Army) destroyed the army of the First East Turkestan Republic at the Battle of Kashgar (1934), bringing the Republic to an end. The Soviet Union invaded the province in the Soviet Invasion of Xinjiang. In the Xinjiang War (1937), the entire province was brought under the control of northeast Manchu warlord Sheng Shicai, who ruled Xinjiang for the next decade with close support from the Soviet Union. In 1944, the President and Premier of China, Chiang Kai-shek, informed by the Soviets of Sheng's intention to join the Soviet Union, decided to shift him out of Xinjiang to Chongqing as the Minister of Agriculture and Forest. More than a decade of Sheng's era had ended. However, a short-lived Soviet-backed Second East Turkestan Republic was established in that year, which lasted until 1949 in what is now Ili Kazakh Autonomous Prefecture (Ili, Tarbagatay and Altay Districts) in northern Xinjiang.

During the Ili Rebellion the Soviet Union backed Uyghur separatists to form the East Turkestan Republic (ETR) in Ili region while the majority of Xinjiang was under the control of the Republic of China. In 1946, the ROC government and the ETR agreed to establish the Coalition Government of Xinjiang Province, although it collapsed shortly after in 1947. The People's Liberation Army entered Xinjiang in 1949 and the Kuomintang commander Tao Zhiyue surrendered the province to them. The original provincial government was relocated to Taipei as the Sinkiang Provincial Government Office (新疆省政府辦事處) to symbolize the ROC's claim of sovereignty over the province; it was eventually dissolved in 1992.

== Demographics ==
Ethnic group	Estimated population 1933
Uyghurs	2,900,173 (77.75%)
Kazakhs	318,716 (8.55%)
Han Chinese	202,239 (5.41%)
Hui	92,146 (2.47%)
Kyrgyz	65,248 (1.75%)
Mongols	63,018 (1.69%)
Taranchis	41,307 (1.11%)
Russians	13,408 (0.36%)
Sibes	9,203 (0.25%)
Tajiks	8,867 (0.24%)
Uzbeks	7,966 (0.21%)
Tatars	4,601 (0.12%)
Solons	2,489 (0.07%)
Manchus	670 (0.02%)
Total	3,730,051

== List of leaders of Turkestan ==
Non-partisan/ unknown Warlords People's Anti-Imperialist Association Kuomintang (Nationalist)

=== Chairperson of the Provincial Government (Mainland era) ===
No.	Portrait	Name (Birth–death)	Term of office		Political Party
1		Yang Zengxin 楊增新; Yáng Zēngxīn (1864–1928)	18 May 1912	July 7, 1928	Xinjiang clique
1		Yang Zengxin 楊增新; Yáng Zēngxīn (1864–1928)	Assassinated.		
2		Jin Shuren 金樹仁; Jīn Shùrén (1879–1941)	July 7, 1928	April 12, 1933	Xinjiang clique
2		Jin Shuren 金樹仁; Jīn Shùrén (1879–1941)	Deposed in a coup.		
3		Liu Wenlong 劉文龍; Liú Wénlóng (1870–1950)	April 14, 1933	September 1933	
3		Liu Wenlong 劉文龍; Liú Wénlóng (1870–1950)	Removed from office and placed under house arrest by Sheng Shicai.		
–		Zhu Ruichi 朱瑞墀; Zhū Ruìchí (1862–1934)	September 1933	March 5, 1934	
–		Zhu Ruichi 朱瑞墀; Zhū Ruìchí (1862–1934)	Figurehead chairman appointed by Sheng Shicai and not recognized by the Central government. Died in office.		
4		Li Rong 李溶; Lǐ Róng (1870–1940)	October 1934	March 21, 1940	
4		Li Rong 李溶; Lǐ Róng (1870–1940)	Figurehead chairman. Died in office.		
5		Sheng Shicai 盛世才; Shèng Shìcái (1895–1970)	April 4, 1940	August 29, 1944	People's Anti-Imperialist Association
		Sheng Shicai 盛世才; Shèng Shìcái (1895–1970)	April 4, 1940	August 29, 1944	Kuomintang
		Sheng Shicai 盛世才; Shèng Shìcái (1895–1970)	Recognized by the Central government only as a duban (military governor), Sheng was de facto ruler of Sinkiang from 1933. In 1940, the Central government recognized him as Provincial chairman. Removed from office.		
6		Wu Zhongxin 吳忠信; Wú Zhōngxìn (1884–1959)	August 29, 1944	March 29, 1946	Kuomintang
6		Wu Zhongxin 吳忠信; Wú Zhōngxìn (1884–1959)	Resigned.		
7		Zhang Zhizhong 張治中; Zhāng Zhìzhōng (1890–1969)	March 1946	June 1947	Kuomintang
7		Zhang Zhizhong 張治中; Zhāng Zhìzhōng (1890–1969)	Removed from office.		
8		Masud Sabri 麥斯武德 مەسئۇت سابرى (1887–1952)	June 1947	January 1949	Kuomintang
8		Masud Sabri 麥斯武德 مەسئۇت سابرى (1887–1952)	First Uighur governor and first non-Han Governor in China during the twentieth century. Appointed during the Ili Rebellion.		
9		Burhan Shahidi 包爾漢 بۇرھان شەھىدى (1894–1989)	January 1949	September 26, 1949	Kuomintang
9		Burhan Shahidi 包爾漢 بۇرھان شەھىدى (1894–1989)	Surrendered to the People's Liberation Army.		

=== Xinjiang Provincial Government Office era ===
==== Chairperson of the Provincial Government ====
No.	Portrait	Name (Birth–death)	Term of office		Political party
1		Yulbars Khan 堯樂博士 يۇلبارس خان (1889–1971)	April 11, 1950	July 27, 1971	Kuomintang
1		Yulbars Khan 堯樂博士 يۇلبارس خان (1889–1971)	Died in office.		

==== Director, Xinjiang Provincial Government Office ====
No.	Portrait	Name (Birth–death)	Term of office		Political party
1		Yao Tao-hung 堯道宏; Yáo Dàohóng (1913–1991)	July 27, 1971	?	Kuomintang
2		Hou Chi-yu 侯紀峪; Hóu Jìyù	?	January 16, 1992	Kuomintang
2		Hou Chi-yu 侯紀峪; Hóu Jìyù	Post abolished.		
