= Tao Zhiyue =

Chinese military officer and politician

General Tao Zhiyue
- 陶峙岳
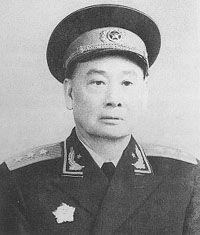

Commander of the Xinjiang Production and Construction Corps
- In office 1954–1968
- Preceded by: Position established
- Succeeded by: Liu Shuangquan

Personal details
- Born: 1892 Xianfeng Township, Ningxiang County, Hunan, Qing dynasty
- Died: 26 December 1988 (aged 95–96) Changsha, Hunan, China
- Party: Chinese Communist Party (1982–88); Revolutionary Committee of the Kuomintang
- Awards: Order of Liberation (First Class Medal) (1955)

Military service
- Allegiance: Republic of China; China
- Branch/service: Hunan clique (1914–26); National Revolutionary Army (1926–47); Republic of China Army (1947–49); People's Liberation Army Ground Force (1949–68); Xinjiang Production and Construction Corps (1954–68)
- Years of service: 1914–1968
- Rank: General of the PLA (awarded 1955); Lieutenant general of the Republic of China Army
- Commands: NRA 1st Army (1938–45); NRA 37th Army Group (1942–44); PLA 22nd Corps (1949–54); PLA Xinjiang Production and Construction Corps (1954–68)
- Battles/wars: Northern Expedition (1926–28); Third Encirclement Campaign against Jiangxi Soviet (1931); Second Sino–Japanese War (1937–45); Chinese Civil War (1946–49); Peaceful Liberation of Xinjiang (1949)

Tao Zhiyue (Chinese: 陶峙岳; pinyin: Táo Zhìyuè; Wade–Giles: T'ao Chih-yüeh; 1892 – 26 December 1988) was a Chinese military officer and politician, Lieutenant General of the National Revolutionary Army of the Republic of China, and a General of the People's Liberation Army of the People's Republic of China.

Born to a wealthy land-owning family, he graduated from the Baoding Military Academy, rose to high military positions in the Nationalist Government of Chiang Kai-shek and was closely associated with Zhang Zhizhong. In 1949, he defected to the Chinese Communist Party, playing a key role in the incorporation of Xinjiang into the People's Republic of China and then went on to hold high office under Mao Zedong, most notably serving as the first commander of the Xinjiang Production and Construction Corps from 1954 to 1968.

== Biography ==
Tao was born in Xianfeng Township, Ningxiang County, Hunan in 1892, to a wealthy land-owning family and received a classical Confucian education.

He entered the Qing Army Preparatory School in 1907. After graduating in 1911, he went to Wuhan and participated in the Wuchang Uprising. He joined the Tongmenghui in 1912, and then studied at the Baoding Military Academy. After graduating as an infantry officer in the autumn of 1916, he returned to Changsha and served as the staff officer at the Provincial Governor's Office of Hunan.

In 1926, he joined the Kuomintang, subsequently participating in the Northern Expedition, and was named commander of the 3rd Brigade of the Independent 2nd Division of the National Revolutionary Army. In April 1927, he was appointed commander of the Nanjing Garrison, and later fought in the victorious Central Plains War. In July 1931, Tao Zhiyue participated in the third encirclement campaign against the Jiangxi Soviet.

During the Second Sino–Japanese War, Tao held many important commands, including over the elite 1st Army. In August 1942, he served as the commander of the 37th Army, and in 1943 he was transferred to command the Hexi Corridor Garrison.

During the Chinese Civil War, Tao Zhiyue became military governor of Xinjiang, serving under Zhang Zhizhong, who was the overall military-political official in charge of the Northwest. In the summer of 1946, Tao assisted Zhang Zhizhong in releasing a large number of Chinese Communist Party members detained in Xinjiang prisons, and personally sent people to escort them to Yan'an. On September 25, 1949, he defected to the Communists, recognizing the authority of Mao Zedong and inviting the People's Liberation Army (who had reached the Yumen Pass) to take control of Xinjiang. More than 70,000 Nationalist soldiers in Xinjiang joined Tao in switching allegiance to the Communists, and PLA forces entered Ürümqi with no resistance on October 17.

From 1949 to 1954, Tao served as deputy commander of the Xinjiang Military Region (under Wang Zhen), member of the Northwest China Military and Political Committee, and commander of the 22nd Corps of the PLA, largely made up of former Nationalist officers and soldiers. He was active in crushing local resistance to the new Communist rule by Uyghurs and Kazakhs.

In 1954, he became the first commander of the Xinjiang Production and Construction Corps, a position he held until 1968. During the Cultural Revolution he was criticized by Red Guard groups, but generally managed to avoid harm.

In 1979, he served as the deputy director of the Standing Committee of the Hunan Provincial People's Congress, and from 1983 to 1988 he was Vice Chairman of the National Committee of the Chinese People's Political Consultative Conference.

He died in Changsha on December 26, 1988, at the age of 96.
