= Osman Batur =

Kazakh military leader (1899–1951)

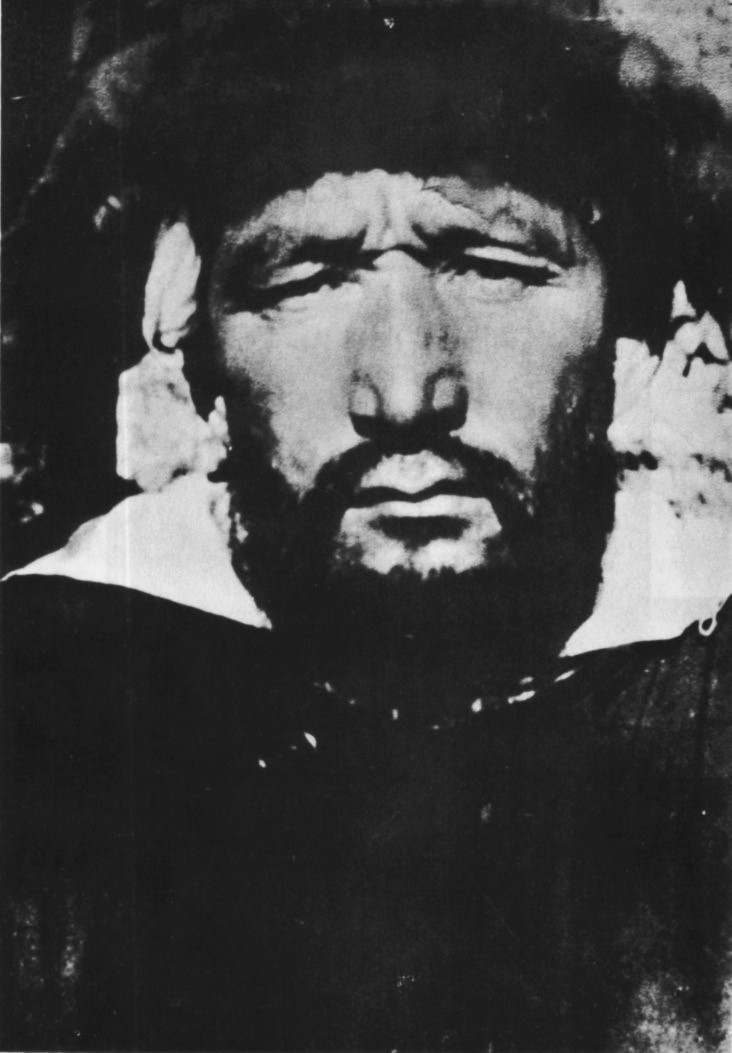
- Osman in an undated photo
- Born: 1899; Koktokay County, Altay Prefecture, Xinjiang, Qing China
- Died: April 29, 1951 (aged 51–52); Ürümqi, Xinjiang, People's Republic of China
- Military career
- Conflicts: Ili Rebellion: Battle of Baitag Bogd; Chinese Civil War: Kuomintang Islamic insurgency (executed)

Chinese name
- Traditional Chinese: 烏斯滿·巴圖爾
- Simplified Chinese: 乌斯满·巴图尔
Transcriptions
Standard Mandarin
- Hanyu Pinyin: Wūsīmǎn Bātú'ěr
- Wade–Giles: Wu^{1}-ssu^{1}-man^{3} Pa^{1}-t'u^{2}-erh^{3}

Birth name
- Traditional Chinese: 烏斯滿·伊斯蘭奧盧
- Simplified Chinese: 乌斯满·伊斯兰奥卢
Transcriptions
Standard Mandarin
- Hanyu Pinyin: Wūsīmǎn Yīsīlán'àolú
- Wade–Giles: Wu^{1}-ssu^{1}-man^{3} I^{1}-ssu^{1}-lan^{2}-ao^{4}-lu^{2}

Mongolian name
- Mongolian Cyrillic: Осман дээрэмчин
- Mongolian script: ᠣᠰᠮᠠᠨ ᠳᠡᢉᠡᠷᠡᠮᠴᠢᠨ

Uyghur name
- Uyghur: ئوسمان باتۇر
Transcriptions
- Latin Yëziqi: Osman Batur
- Siril Yëziqi: Осман Батур

Kazakh name
- Kazakh: وسپان باتىر; Оспан батыр Ospan Batyr

Osman Batur (Kazakh: Оспан батыр, romanized: Ospan Batyr; 1899 – April 29, 1951) was a Kazakh military leader active in the Altai Mountains. He led a personal army of fellow Kazakhs and fought alongside the Soviet-backed Second East Turkestan Republic, before defecting to the Nationalist forces of the Republic of China.

== Career ==
Osman was born Osman Islam, or Ospan Islamuly (Оспан Исламұлы) in his native Kazakh, in 1899 in Öngdirkara, in the Koktokay region of Altay. He was the son of Islam Bey, a middle-class farmer, and Kayşa (Ayşa). Osman later received the honorific Batur, meaning "hero", from his allies. During the 1930s, he was a little-known gang leader. In 1940, Osman became one of the leaders of the Kazakh uprising in the Altay district against Soviet-aligned governor Sheng Shicai. The rebellion was caused by the transfer of pastures and watering places to Dungans and Han Chinese settlers. When Sheng aligned himself with the Kuomintang government, Stalin, although wary of Osman, decided to assist the rebellion in order expand Soviet influence in Xinjiang. Mongolian Chairman Khorloogiin Choibalsan also supplied to the rebels. In the spring of 1944, Osman was forced to retreat to Mongolia, and his unit's departure was covered by the Soviet and Mongolian air forces. He later joined the Soviet-backed Second East Turkestan Republic (ETR). By September 1944, the Kuomintang had been expelled from Altay.

Osman was appointed by the ETR government as governor of the Altay District. Disputes immediately began between him and the ETR government. Osman and his troops ignored government orders. In particular, when the ETR army suspended military operations against the Kuomintang troops (the ETR leadership accepted the proposal to start negotiations to create a single coalition government in Xinjiang), Osman's troops intensified their activities. Osman rebelled against the ETR and began plans to create an Altay Khanate, free of Soviet or Chinese influence, hoping for support from Mongolia. However these plans never came to fruition.

== Supporting the Kuomintang ==
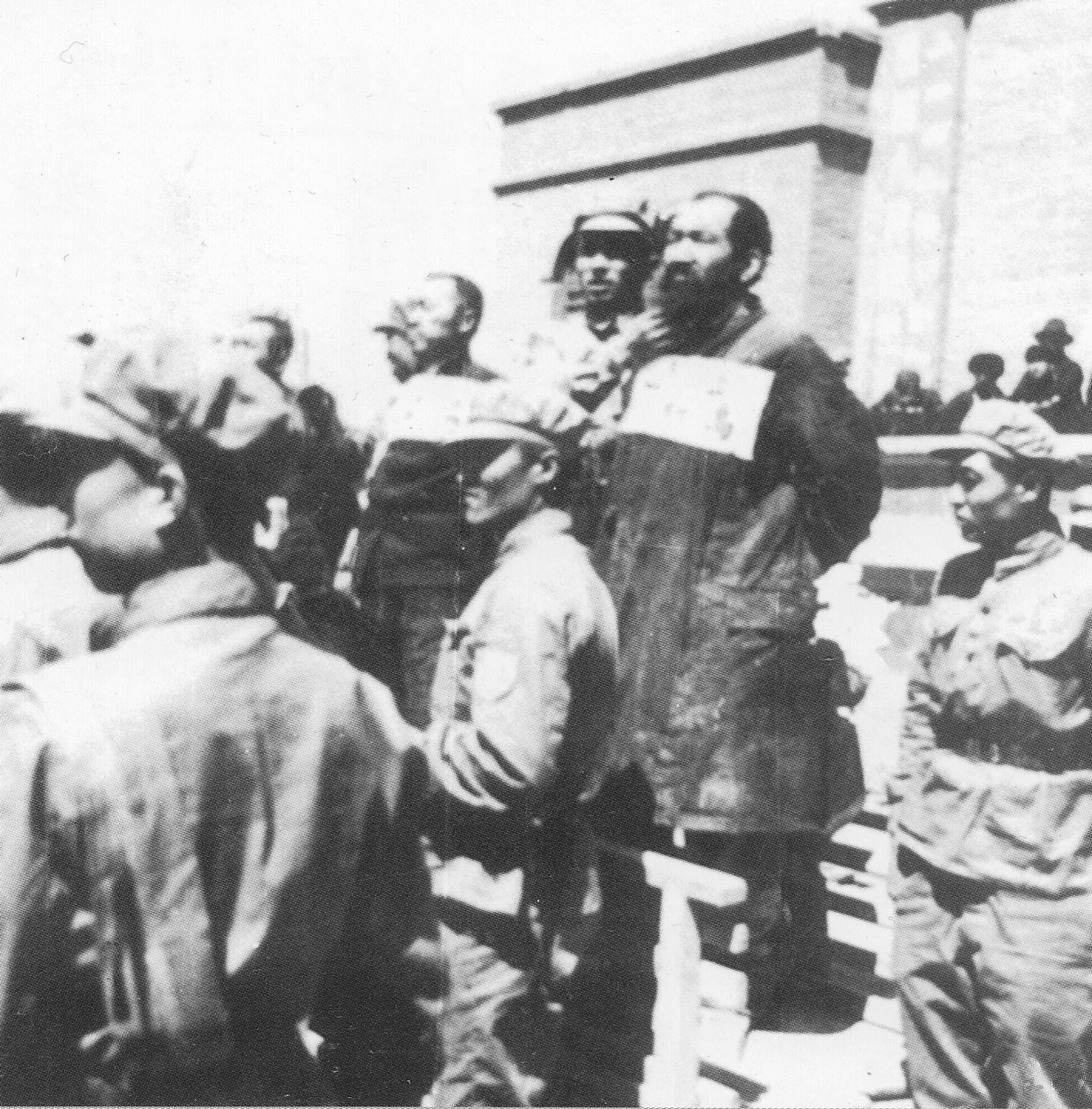
Osman and other captured Muslim leaders await execution.

At the end of 1946, Osman joined the Kuomintang government and was appointed the head of the Xinjiang government in Altay District. At the beginning of June 1947, several hundred of Osman's troops, with the support of Kuomintang army units, invaded the territory of Mongolia in the Battle of Baitag Bogd. On June 5, Mongol troops approached with the support of Soviet aviation and expelled the Chinese troops. Then, the Mongols invaded Xinjiang but were defeated at the Chinese outpost of Pei-ta-shan. Subsequently, both sides exchanged in several raids; skirmishes continued until the summer of 1948. Osman continued supporting the Kuomintang government, receiving reinforcements and supplies. He fought in the Altay District against the troops of the East Turkestan Republic, but was defeated and fled east. The Chinese Communists took control of Xinjiang in 1949, with Osman continuing his campaign against the People's Liberation Army. He was captured in Qinghai and executed in Urumqi on April 29, 1951.

After his death, many of his followers fled over the Himalayas. They were later airlifted to Turkey and resettled there. He was enshrined in the National Revolutionary Martyrs' Shrine in Taipei in 1981.

== Flag ==
The banner, kept in the Qinggil County of Xinjiang by the 11th descendant of Er-Zhanibek Zardykan, became the flag of the national liberation uprising of the Kazakhs under the leadership of Osman Batyr in China in 1940. The sacred flag of Er-Zhanibek Batyr, made of fine white silk, a fathom wide, with red and yellow silk tassels, was attached to a black, three-fathom spear. According to legend, this banner was presented to Er-Zhanibek by Abylai Khan himself. Academician Z. Samashev writes that the flag of Er-Zhanibek was yellow. On this account, Askar Umarov concludes that it could have been a white banner that had turned yellow with time.

== See also ==
- Kazakh exodus from Xinjiang
