= Wu Zhongxin =

Chinese general and politician (1884–1959)

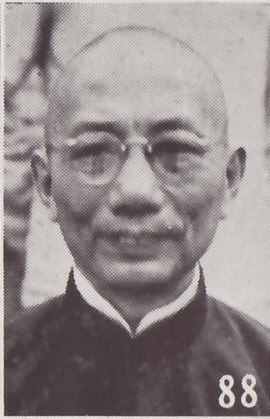
- Wu Zhongxin as pictured in The Most Recent Biographies of Chinese Dignitaries

Secretary-General to the President
- In office December 24, 1948 – January 29, 1949
- Preceded by: Wu Dingchang
- Succeeded by: Weng Wenhao

Governor of Xinjiang
- In office August 29, 1944 – March 29, 1946
- Preceded by: Sheng Shicai
- Succeeded by: Zhang Zhizhong

Chairman of the Mongolian and Tibetan Affairs Commission
- In office August 8, 1936 – December 6, 1944
- Preceded by: Lin Yungai
- Succeeded by: Luo Liangjian

Governor of Guizhou
- In office April 17, 1935 – August 2, 1936
- Preceded by: Wang Jialie
- Succeeded by: Gu Zhutong

Governor of Anhui
- In office April 5, 1932 – May 16, 1933
- Preceded by: Chen Diaoyuan
- Succeeded by: Liu Zhenhua

Personal details
- Born: March 15, 1884 Hefei, Anhui Province, China
- Died: December 16, 1959 (aged 75) Taipei, Taiwan
- Party: Kuomintang

Military service
- Allegiance: Republic of China
- Rank: General

Wu Zhongxin, or Wu Chung-hsin (traditional Chinese: 吳忠信; simplified Chinese: 吴忠信; pinyin: Wú Zhōngxìn; March 15, 1884 – December 16, 1959) was a General and government official of the Republic of China. He was associated with the CC Clique. In his tenure as the Chairman of the Mongolian and Tibetan Affairs Commission of the Republic of China, Wu was present at the enthronement of the 14th Dalai Lama. From late 1944 until early 1946, he was one of the few KMT governors of Xinjiang.

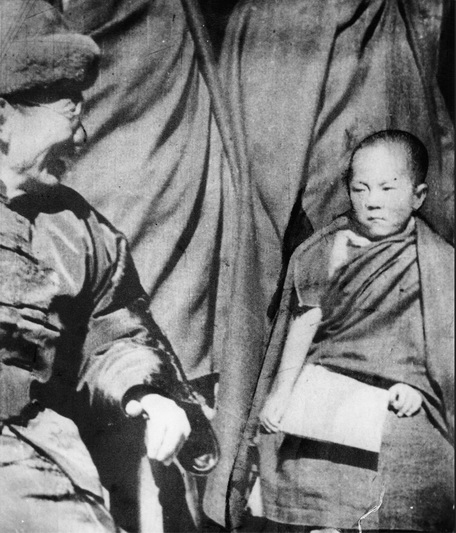
Wu Zhongxin, Republic of China's Chairman of the Mongolian and Tibetan Affairs Commission with Lhamo Dhondup, the future 14th Dalai Lama in Amdo about 1940. A ransom was paid to Ma Bufang to release the boy and his family to go to monastic education in Lhasa.
