= Zhang Zhizhong =

Chinese politician (1890–1969)

General 2nd Rank Zhang Zhizhong
- 張治中
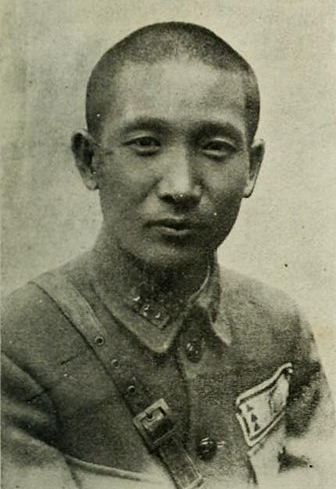
- General Zhang Zhizhong in 1933

Vice Chairman of the Standing Committee of the National People's Congress
- In office 3 January 1965 – 6 April 1969
- Chairman: Zhu De

Vice Chairman of the National Defense Council of the People's Republic of China
- In office 27 September 1954 – 6 April 1969

Governor of Xinjiang
- In office 1 April 1946 – 21 May 1947
- Preceded by: Wu Zhongxin
- Succeeded by: Masud Sabri

Governor of Hunan
- In office 20 November 1937 – 21 January 1939
- Preceded by: He Jian
- Succeeded by: Xue Yue

Personal details
- Born: 27 October 1890 Chaohu, Qing dynasty
- Died: 6 April 1969 (aged 78) Beijing, People's Republic of China
- Education: Baoding Military Academy

Military service
- Allegiance: Republic of China; China
- Years of service: 1928–1969
- Rank: General 2nd Rank
- Commands: Beijing Shanghai Garrison Corps; 5th Army; 9th Army Group
- Battles/wars: Battle of Shanghai (1932), (1937); Battle of Changsha (1939), Ili Rebellion

Zhang Zhizhong
- Traditional Chinese: 張治中
- Simplified Chinese: 张治中
Transcriptions
Standard Mandarin
- Hanyu Pinyin: Zhāng Zhìzhōng

Zhang Zhizhong (also Chang Chih-chung; 27 October 1890 – 10 April 1969) was a Chinese political and military leader who served as a general in the National Revolutionary Army of the Republic of China and later a pro-Communist politician in the People's Republic of China.

Originally a supporter and close associate of Chiang Kai-shek, Zhang belonged to the left wing of the Kuomintang, advocating policies such as collaboration with the Communists against Japan and nationalization of foreign-owned businesses. In 1949 he defected from the Nationalists, becoming a follower of Mao Zedong, and went on to hold high office in the new Communist government, serving as Vice Chairman of the National Defense Council (1954–1969) and Vice Chairman of the National People's Congress (1965–1969).

== Life ==
He was born in Chaohu, Anhui, and attended the Baoding Military Academy from which he graduated in 1916 as an infantry officer. He also briefly attended Shanghai University, studying Social Sciences, but did not take a degree. He then served in the local warlord armies of Yunnan and Guangxi before heeding the call of Nationalist leader Sun Yat-sen and moving to Guangzhou to become an instructor at the Whampoa Military Academy. He participated in the Northern Expedition, and after the Nationalists established the new republican government in Nanjing, became the Commandant of the Central Military Academy in 1929, a post he held for 8 years, until 1937. This was a highly important and sensitive assignment, as Zhang was given the task of moulding the beliefs and ideology of the young officer candidates.

He joined in Generalissimo Chiang Kai-shek's successful campaign against Yan Xishan and Feng Yuxiang, and led the 5th Army in the 1932 battle at Shanghai against Japan, and participated in setting up air-defense at the capital of Nanjing, including Jurong airbase. Later, as the head of the 9th Army Group (第九集團軍), Zhang personally supervised the defense of Shanghai against Japan in 1937. During these years, Zhang was generally regarded as one of Chiang's trusted confidants.

Later in the Second Sino-Japanese War, Zhang was appointed Governor of Hunan from 1937 to 1940 and was responsible for the Great Fire of Changsha, a fire that got out of control when he ordered key buildings razed in anticipation of a coming Japanese attack (which failed to materialize at the expected time). He was relieved of his duty after this event and several individuals responsible for the faulty intelligence were executed.

In 1940, he became the Director of the Political Department of the Military Affairs Commission, another highly sensitive position, indicating Chiang's continued trust in him. He was Governor of Xinjiang in 1946 and 1947. After his retirement he remained in Xinjiang. The whole time he had to deal with the Ili Rebellion.

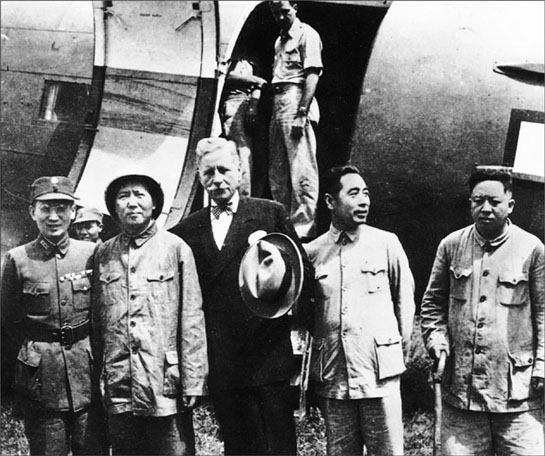
1945 in Yan'an, left to right: Zhang Zhizhong, Mao Zedong, Patrick J. Hurley, Zhou Enlai and Wang Ruofei

In 1949, Zhang was made the chief negotiator of the Nationalists for peace talks with the Communists in Beijing. After the failure of the negotiations, he remained in Beijing and announced his withdrawal from the Kuomintang. After that, he was instrumental in persuading his close friend General Tao Zhiyue (then the Nationalist Governor of Xinjiang) to also defect to the Communists, an action which greatly helped in the mostly peaceful incorporation of Xinjiang into the People's Republic of China.

Mao Zedong greatly appreciated Zhang's services and appointed him to high positions in the new People's Republic. Zhang Zhizhong served as Vice Chairman of the Northwest China Military and Political Committee (1949–1954), Vice Chairman of the National Defense Council (1954–1969) and Vice Chairman of the National People's Congress (1965–1969).

During the Cultural Revolution, he managed to escape persecution due to the protection of Zhou Enlai. He died on 6 April 1969, aged 78.

== Timeline of military career ==
- 1929–1937: Commandant of the Central Military Academy
- 1932: General Officer Commanding V Corps
- 1937: General Officer Commanding Nanjing and Shanghai Garrison
- 1937: Commander in Chief 9th Army Group
- 1937: Commander in Chief Central Forces and 3rd War Zone
- 1940: Chief Aide-de-Camp to Generalissimo Chiang Kai-shek
- 1940–1945: Director of the Political Department of the Military Affairs Commission
- 1940–1945: Member of the Military Affairs Commission
- 1940–1945: Secretary-General of the Youth Corps San Min Chu I
- 1945–1949: Director of Nationalist North-western Headquarters
- 1946–1947: Chairman of the Government of Xinjiang Province
- 1949–1954: Vice Chairman of the Northwest China Military and Political Committee, People's Republic of China
- 1954–1969: Vice Chairman of the National Defense Council, People's Republic of China
