= Sheng Shiqi =

Chinese communist brigade commander (d. 1942)

- 盛世骐
- Born: 1901; Kaiyuan, Manchuria, Qing Empire
- Died: 19 March 1942 (aged 40–41); Ürümqi, Xinjiang
- Spouse: Chen Xiuying (1934–1942)
- Relatives: Sheng Shicai (brother)
- Military career
- Allegiance: Xinjiang government
- Service years: 1932–1942
- Rank: General
- Commands: Xinjiang motorised brigade

Sheng Shiqi (Chinese: 盛世骐; pinyin: Shèng Shìqí; Wade–Giles: Sheng Shih-ch'i; 1901 – 19 March 1942) was a Chinese brigade commander in Xinjiang, and the brother of the governor of that province, Sheng Shicai. His murder was a matter of dispute between the Soviet Union and the regional government in Xinjiang, with Sheng Shicai claiming his brother's murder was orchestrated by the Soviets in order to stage a coup, while the Soviets claimed Sheng ordered his brother's murder because of his close ties to Moscow.

== Life ==
The fourth younger brother of Sheng Shicai, a de facto independent ruler of the Chinese Xinjiang Province, Sheng Shiqi graduated from the Cavalry Division of the NCO School in Tokyo, Japan, and was the instructor of the Nanjing Army Cavalry School. His brother Sheng already served as a member of the Governor of Xinjiang Jin Shuren's staff when in 1932 Shiqi became the chief of the security guards of the Xinjiang Border Defence Office.

All this occurred within the frame of fierce fighting between the Hui forces of General Ma Zhongying, aligned with the Nationalist government and Xinjiang's provincial government. As Ma's forces were sieging Ürümqi between December 1932 and March 1933 and Jin started to lose the hold on the city, Sheng Shicai arrived to seize the power by himself, with the support of the White Russians and the provincial bureaucrats. The coup leaders appointed him the Commissioner of the Xinjiang Border Defence, i. e., Military Governor or Duban on 14 April 1933. During Sheng Shicai's rule, Xinjiang was effectively under the Soviet control, largely independent from the Nationalist government.

In 1934, Shiqi married Chen Xiuying, a daughter of a local magistrate. He went to Moscow in May 1937 to study at the Moscow Military Academy "Mikhail Vasilyevich Frunze". His wife lived with him and was completely russified while in Moscow. In the winter of 1941–42, after his studies, he returned to Xinjiang, and was given command of a motorized brigade in Ürümqi. According to his brother Sheng, Shiqi contributed greatly to the training of Xinjiang's motorized brigade, consolidating Xinjiang's administration and strengthening border defenses. The position of the brigade commander gave Shiqi extensive military power.

== Murder ==
With the German forces invading the Soviet Union, Sheng Shicai used the opportunity to end the Soviet influence by striking down the Chinese communists, who served as the Soviet proxies and to approach the Central government.

Shiqi was murdered on 19 March 1942. His death is considered mysterious. According to one version, the Soviets, fearing that Sheng Shicai might switch sides, attempted a coup, convincing Sheng Shiqi's wife to commit his murder. Another version proposes that he was murdered by Sheng Shicai because of his close ties to Moscow.

On March 19, 1942, Sheng Shiqi went back home with his younger brother Sheng Shiji. The two whispered in the living room for a long time, and then entered their mother's room where Sheng Shicai was also present. However, the conversation did not go well; Sheng Shiqi berated his wife for not taking good care of their daughter to vent his anger. Then his wife, Chen Xiuying, went to the kitchen to boil herbal medicine while Sheng Shiqi was talking to his daughter in the bedroom. Suddenly, Chen Xiuying heard the bang of a gun; when she rushed into the room, she saw Sheng Shiqi fall to the ground and was killed on the spot.

In Sheng Shicai's opinion, his brother Sheng Shiqi was killed by his wife Chen Xiuying, who was arrested on 21 March. In Chen Xiuying's confession, she was convinced by her husband's friend, Ratov, who told her that Sheng Shiqi had an affair. Out of jealousy, she started seeing Ratov. However, this relationship was discovered by Xiao Zuoxin, who blackmailed Chen for sex and later forced her to murder Sheng Shiqi for her safety.

However, Vyacheslav Molotov, the Soviet Union's Foreign Minister rebutted Sheng Shicai's accusation and stated Bakulin, Ratov and other senior officials were reliable persons, who were dedicated to maintaining Soviet-Chinese friendship for a long time. After learning about the incident, the Soviets believed that Shiqi's murder was part of the Sheng Shicai's preparation to rely on the Central government.

Allen S. Whiting, who interviewed Sheng Shicai and coauthored a book with him, expressed an opinion that Shiqi might have been murdered on the orders of Sheng Shicai, because of his pro-Soviet stance and opposition to the rapprochement to the Central Government or opposition to the purge against the Chinese communists. Andrew D. W. Forbes concurs with this opinion, stating that Shiqi was murdered because of his pro-Soviet views. On the contrary, Sheng Shicai's biographer from mainland China Cai Jinsong, who interviewed Sheng's sisters-in-law, concluded that Shiqi's death was probably a homicide, perpetrated by the Soviets with the help of Chen, which they tried to cover up as a suicide.

After Shiqi's death, Sheng Shicai continued to crack down on Chinese communists. In July 1942 he ordered their relocation in the Ürümqi outskirts for "protection". As the Central government was gaining full control over Xinjiang, Sheng Shicai ordered the communists to be executed, among them Mao Zemin, Mao Zedong's brother, in September 1943.
