= Pavel Pappengut =

White Russian colonel (1894–1933)

Pavel Petrovich Pappengut
- Павел Петрович Папенгут
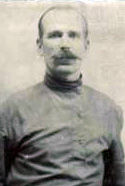
- Born: 27 May 1894
- Died: December 1933/January 1934 (aged 39); Ürümqi, Xinjiang
- Military career
- Allegiance: Russian Empire (1914–17) Russian Republic (1917) White movement (1917–22) Xinjiang (1922–33)
- Branch: Army
- Service years: 1914–33
- Rank: Colonel
- Conflicts: World War I; Russian Civil War; Kumul Rebellion; First Battle of Ürümqi; Second Battle of Ürümqi

Pavel Petrovich Pappengut (also Papengut; Russian: Па́вел Петро́вич Папенгут; 27 May 1894 – December 1933) was a colonel of the Russian Empire, later officer of the White Russian forces, member of the underground Turkestan Military Organization, comrade-in-arms of Alexander Dutov.

After the defeat of the White movement in the Russian Civil War, Pappengut settled in the Ili region in northern Xinjiang. There he commanded the White Russian forces, who were known to be the most competent military force in Xinjiang due to their experience. Pappengut fought against Ma Zhongying in Kumul Rebellion in 1931. In late September or early October 1931, Pappengut commanded some 250 White Russians who headed the forces of Zhang Peiyuan moving from Ili towards the besieged garrison in Kumul Old City. Ma's Dungan forces retreated westwards towards Qijiaojingzhen and the advancing White Russians. There were no serious battles between them. However, in one of the initial skirmishes in the village of Liao-tun, some 150 km east of Qijiaojingzhen, the White Russian forces seriously wounded Ma, while the White Russians had one dead and two wounded. As a result of that injury, a large portion of the Dungan forces retreated towards Gansu in the northwest. The garrison in Kumul Old City was finally relieved on or around 1 November 1931.

In the winter of 1932, Ma Shiming and his Dungan forces, joined by Ma Fuming and a large number of Turkic rebels, started advancing towards the provincial capital of Ürümqi. Soon, a full-scale revolt occurred in Kucha and Khotan. Jin Shuren, Xinjiang's Governor, responded by expanding Pappengut's White Russian force from 250 to 1,500 men. The White Russian emigrants had no other choice but to enlist since Jin threatened them with deportation to the Soviet Union and even arrest of their women to force them to recruit. The Dungan forces reached the city defended by only 700 men on 21 February 1933. The city was closed and suffered food shortages, while tensions between the Han Chinese and Muslims were high. The fall of Ürümqi was seemingly eminent, but the arrival of some 300 White Russians changed the tide and the Dungan forces were driven back some 1 km northwestwards after two days of fighting.

Sheng Shicai, Chief of Staff of Xinjiang's Frontier Army, arrived with a strong and capable force from Turpan to help the besieged Ürümqi, forcing the Dungan insurgents to retreat to the countryside. The countryside fell to the hands of the insurgents and the Kazakh uprising also occurred in Shara Sume. Soviet Union sent additional reinforcement of some 2,000 experienced Chinese soldiers forced by the Japanese across the Soviet border who were interned by the Soviets. These soldiers were known as the North-East National Salvation Army. They arrived in Ürümqi on 27 March 1933 and strengthen the position of the provincial administration as well as of Sheng Shicai, who was their fellow Northeasterner. At the same time, Jin's authority was undermined.

Even though the White Russian forces gave significant contributions to Xinjiang's war efforts, they were irregularly paid and provided with the worst horses and ammunition. Pappengut and other White Russian officers approached the leaders of the National Salvation Army, and having been assured of their backing, mounted a coup against Jin on the night of 12 April. Jin escaped to the Soviet Union via Chuguchak and returned to China. His younger brother and military commander Jin Shu-hsin were captured and executed. Sheng, who was at the time in Uruba was appointed as Duban or Military Governor, while Liu Wenlong took the position of Provincial Chairman.

Pappengut was executed in December 1933 or January 1934 under the orders of Sheng Shicai, Military Governor of Xinjiang by the request of Garegin Apresov, Soviet Consul General in Ürümqi.
