= Liu Wenlong =

Chinese civil servant

- 劉文龍

Provincial Chairman of Xinjiang
- In office 14 April 1933 – September 1933
- Preceded by: Jin Shuren
- Succeeded by: Zhu Ruichi

Commissioner for Education of Xinjiang
- In office 1922 – 14 April 1933
- Governor: Jin Shuren

Prefect of Yarkant
- In office 1910–1910

Prefect of Ürümqi
- In office 1907–1910

Prefect of Tarbagatay
- In office 1904–1907

Personal details
- Born: 1871 Yueyang, Hunan, Qing Empire
- Died: 1950 (aged 78–79) Ürümqi, Sinkiang, China

Liu Wenlong (Chinese: 劉文龍; pinyin: Liú Wénlóng; Wade–Giles: Liu Wen-lung; 1871–1950) was a Chinese public official who held the post of Civil Governor of Sinkiang from April to September 1933, and previously served as the region's commissioner for education.

== Biography ==
Liu was born in Yueyang, Hunan in 1871. From 1904 to 1907 he served as the Tarbagatay prefect. He was then appointed the prefect of Ürümqi, where he served between 1907 and 1910. After that, he served as the prefect of Yarkant. The same year he was accused of corruption.

Liu served as a commissioner for education under Governor Jin Shuren. In April 1931, before the Kumul Rebellion fully escalated, Liu, along with Yen Yu-Shan, the commissioner for reconstruction, advised Jin the policy of conciliation. However, Jin, overestimating his military power, ordered his troops to deal with the rebelling Muslims.

In December 1932, Ma Zhongying's forces started the sieg of Ürümqi, but the White Russians and Sheng Shicai's troops successfully defended the city. In March 1933, the Manchurian Salvation Army, part of the National Revolutionary Army (NRA), came to their aid through the Soviet territory. During these events, Jin's prestige declined and correspondingly Sheng became increasingly popular. The culmination was the coup staged by the White Russians and a group of provincial bureaucrats led by Chen Zhong, Tao Mingyue and Li Xiaotian on 12 April 1933, who overthrew Jin, who escaped to China proper via Siberia.

Without conferring the Central government, the coup leaders appointed Sheng the Commissioner of the Sinkiang Border Defence, i. e., Military Governor or duban on 14 April 1933, resurrecting the old title. Liu, a powerless provincial bureaucrat was installed as the civil governor.

Without clearly stating whether it recognises the changes in Sinkiang, the government appointed Huang Musong, then a Deputy Chief of General Staff, a "pacification commissioner" in May 1933. He arrived in Ürümqi on 10 June. Sheng expected that the Central government would recognise him as duban, and that Huang's visit would affect that decision. Huang was ignorant of the frontier problems and his arrogant behavior offended some of the provincial leaders. The rumors spread that Huang was already named a new governor or that Chiang Kai-Shek decided to split Sinkiang into several smaller provinces. However, the true Huang's task was to secure the cooperation between the coup leaders and establish a new provincial mechanism with a pro-Nanking stance. Sheng exploited the rumours, and charged that Huang, an agent of Wang Jingwei had plotted with Liu, Zhang and Ma to overthrow the provincial government. On 26 June Huang was placed under house arrest, and the three coup leaders were also arrested and immediately executed. Huang recommended the Central government recognise Liu as Civil Governor and Sheng as a duban. After the Central government apologised and promised recognition, Huang was allowed to return to Nanking three weeks after the arrest. Liu was finally confirmed into office on 1 August 1933.

Shortly afterward, in August Chiang sent Foreign Minister Luo Wengan, as a sign of goodwill, to preside over Sheng's inauguration ceremony as a Commissioner of the Sinkiang Border Defence. However, at the same time, the Central government used Luo's visit to contact two of Sheng's rivals, Ma in Turpan and Zhang in Yining. They were encouraged to launch an attack against Sheng. As soon as Luo left the province, a war broke out between Sheng on one side, and Ma and Zhang on the other. Sheng accused Luo not only of plotting but also of an assassination attempt. Luo's left Sinkiang in early October.

In September 1933, Sheng accused Liu of plotting with Ma and Zhang through Luo with Nanking in order to overthrow him. He was forced to resign and was replaced by Zhu Ruichi, a more controllable official.
