= Garegin Apresov =

Soviet diplomat

His Excellency Garegin Abramovich Apresov
- Гарегин Абрамович Апресов
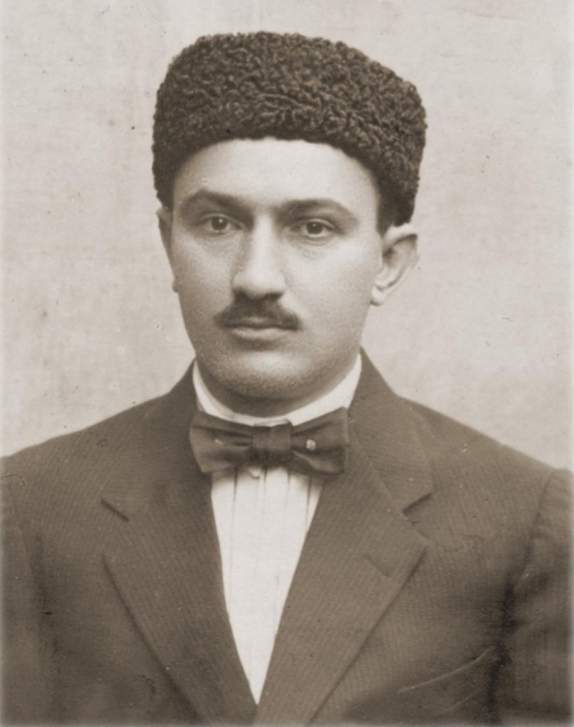

Soviet Consul General in Urumqi
- In office December 1933 – March 1937
- Preceded by: Moisei Nemchenko
- Succeeded by: Adi Malikov

Personal details
- Born: 6 January 1890 Qusar, Baku Governorate, Russian Empire
- Died: 11 September 1941 (aged 51) Medvedev Forest, Oryol, Soviet Union
- Cause of death: Execution
- Citizenship: Soviet Union
- Party: Communist Party of the Soviet Union
- Education: Moscow State University
- Profession: Diplomat
- Awards: Order of Lenin

Garegin Abramovich Apresov (Russian: Гарегин Абрамович Апресов; 6 January 1890 – 11 September 1941) was a multifaceted figure of the Soviet era — a revolutionary, diplomat, intelligence officer, and Comintern representative whose work lay at the intersection of politics, ideology, and intelligence, particularly in the context of Asian affairs. Before joining the People's Commissariat of Foreign Affairs, he had extensive experience in political activities, including work in the government of Baku commissars, as well as active participation in the communist movement. As an expert on the East, he proved himself effective in operational work and propaganda. He worked in the USSR missions in Persia and China, holding posts including Chargé d'Affaires of the USSR in Persia, Consul General of the USSR in Urumqi and authorized representative of the Central Committee of the All-Union Communist Party (Bolsheviks) for Xinjiang (China). With personal access to Joseph Stalin, at the peak of his activities in Xinjiang, he had exceptional powers, effectively being the key representative of Soviet interests in the region. He was shot as part of Stalin's repressions.

== Early years ==
Garegin A. Apresov (Apresoff, Apresof) was born to an Armenian family in Qusar in what was then Baku Governorate in Caucasus Viceroyalty of the Russian Empire. His parents lived in Baku, but they had a dacha in Qusar. However, according to his own autobiographies, he was born in Baku. As a 6th grade student at the gymnasium, in 1908 he joined the revolutionary movement. He took part in Baku-wide strikes, publishing leaflets and a student magazine. At the end of 1908, the Baku gendarmerie conducted a search of the Apresovs' house, and G. A. Apresov was arrested. He spent several days under arrest.

He studied law at the Moscow University and graduated in 1914. In Moscow he also took part in student protests.

In 1915 he was called up for military service and served as a soldier on the Caucasian Front in the city of Kars. He was later sent to the ensign school in Tiflis. After finishing school, he served on the Persian border in the Cavalry Border Regiment, from where, for anti-war work among the soldiers, he was transferred under supervision to the detachment headquarters and appointed to the position of adjutant of the headquarters.

Apresov spoke several foreign languages (mainly Eastern).

== After the 1917 revolution ==
=== Among the Baku commissars ===
From 1917 to 1918 Apresov was the President of the Lankaran Municipal Council near the border with Persia in the territory of modern Azerbaijan, where he was caught up in the February Revolution.

In March 1918 he was named a member of a government's directorate in Baku and later a member of the Directorate for Food in Baku. He provided assistance in organizing food supplies to Baku, which was experiencing a severe food crisis. In Baku Apresov interacted with Prokofy Dzhaparidze and Hamid Sultanov.

=== Volga region ===
From 1918 Apresov was the member of the Revolutionary Tribunal in Saratov, where, according to his autobiography, he moved due to illness.

Apresov joined the Communist Party in 1918.

From 1918 to 1919 he was the Leader of the Provincial Justice Department in Saratov. He was a member of a communist special forces unit and took part in suppressing uprisings against the Bolsheviks.

=== Caucassus ===
In 1920, he was involved in underground activity in the Caucasus. Before the Sovietization of Azerbaijan, he worked for the underground Regional Committee, carrying out special tasks for the latter, which mainly boiled down to organizing the financial and monetary operations of the Regional Committee.

From 1921 to 1921, Apresov served as Deputy People's Commissar for Justice of the Azerbaijan SSR and as a commander of a brigade of the Red Army, head of the border troops.

Between 1921 and 1922 Apresov was a member of the Collegiate of the People's Commissars for Justice in the Georgian SSR.

== Work in Persia ==
From 1922 to 1923 Apresov served as the Soviet Consul in Rasht, Persia, from 1924 to 1925 in Isfahan, Persia, and from 1923 to 1926 in Mashhad, Persia. He was also a Soviet Interim Commissioner for Persia (1923–24).

Apresov was described by British diplomats as an ardent communist and energetic propagandist. According to their testimony, the governor of Gilan Nayer es Sultan was completely "under the thumb" of Apresov and supported the communist program.

According to defector G.S. Agabekov, in addition to diplomatic posts, Apresov was a representative of the Foreign Department of the Joint State Political Directorate (INO OGPU) as well as an emissary of Soviet military intelligence and the Comintern (he was an employee of the Executive Committee of the Comintern.) G.S. Agabekov spoke about G.A. Apresov as follows:

Apresov, holding the position of Soviet consul and resident, was simultaneously a representative of the Military Intelligence Directorate and the Comintern and brought the work in Meshed to the proper level. A lawyer by training, very intelligent, well versed in the psychology of the East, fluent in Persian and the Turkic dialect, loving risk and adventure, he was created by nature to work in the OGPU in the East. In addition, he had some practice in his work. While being the Soviet consul in Rasht, he managed to steal the consul's archive through the mistress of the English consul in Rasht, thereby winning the full trust of this institution.

Apresov got to work, and by the middle of 1923, copies of all the secret correspondence of the British consulate in Meshed with the British envoy in Tehran and with the Indian general staff began to arrive from him.

...Despite Apresov’s successes, the OGPU was not satisfied with him, because he sent copies of his reports to the Military Intelligence Directorate and the People’s Commissariat of Foreign Affairs, and the OGPU likes to have a monopoly on information.

The episode of the theft of documents also appears in the intelligence summary sent by the British envoy Percy Loraine to the British Foreign Secretary George Curzon in January 1923. In it, Loraine directly accuses Apresov of organizing the theft, but at the same time claims that the secret documents remained intact.

Apresov actively worked with the Armenian diaspora in Persia and tried to influence the church policy of the local Armenian church. The Dashnak Committee in Persia, which had significant influence on church structures, even considered the possibility of moving the episcopal see from Isfahan in order to counteract Apresov's pressure.

Contemporaries noted that during his time in Persia, Apresov was distinguished by his assertive and often confrontational style of conducting business. British diplomatic dispatches from 1923, dedicated to the conflict surrounding the wife of the Russian White Russian émigré, Maria Denisova, describe a scandal within the walls of the Soviet consulate in Mashhad: after a verbal altercation, Apresov demanded her arrest and deportation, and then, according to the British, sought intervention from the central authorities and even broke off official relations with the governor of Khorasan, insisting on his demands. The same documents noted his active intervention in local political processes (particularly in the context of the Majlis elections and the activities of the "Khorasan Union"). Further details about the consul's image are contained in the oral recollections of Iranian figure Abol Hassan Ebtehaj, who claims that, on Apresov's orders, Soviet consulate staff in Rasht resorted to harsh pressure on an Iranian lawyer defending a local resident in a dispute with an unnamed Soviet citizen, even going so far as to detain him in the consulate's basement.

Despite his energy and ingenuity, in 1926 Apresov was summoned to Moscow and removed from his post after what the center considered to be a mistake in his political analysis of the uprising in Khorasan.

In 1927 Apresov was characterized by the plenipotentiary representative of the USSR in Persia, K.K. Yurenev, as an excellent intelligence officer, but also as an employee somewhat inclined to self-promotion and adventurism. Nevertheless, he was recommended by Yurenev for "serious work".

== Work in the USSR ==
Between September 1927 and July 1928, Apresov served as a member of the Military Collegiate of the Supreme Court of the Soviet Union, but resigned at his own request.

From 1927 to 1932 he was a People's Commissariat for Foreign Affairs (NKID) agent in Baku.

He was NKID's plenipotentiary before the Council of People's Commissars of the Azerbaijan SSR in 1929 and the Uzbek SSR and the Soviet Central Asia in 1930.

In a handwritten explanation of plenipotentiary representative of the USSR in Persia, K.K. Yurenev's 1927 character reference, which was added to it in the archives of the Central Committee of the All-Union Communist Party (Bolsheviks), his position or status is listed as “authorized representative in Turkestan for border issues”. It is known that in 1928, Apresov participated in the creation of a special “Eastern Department” at the Society for the Study of Azerbaijan in Baku, which was engaged in studying the political and socio-economic situation in neighboring Eastern countries, including Iran and Turkey, as well as preparing analytical materials and bulletins on current events.

There is a mention of Apresov giving lectures on tactics in Central Asia at the Communist University of the Toilers of the East.

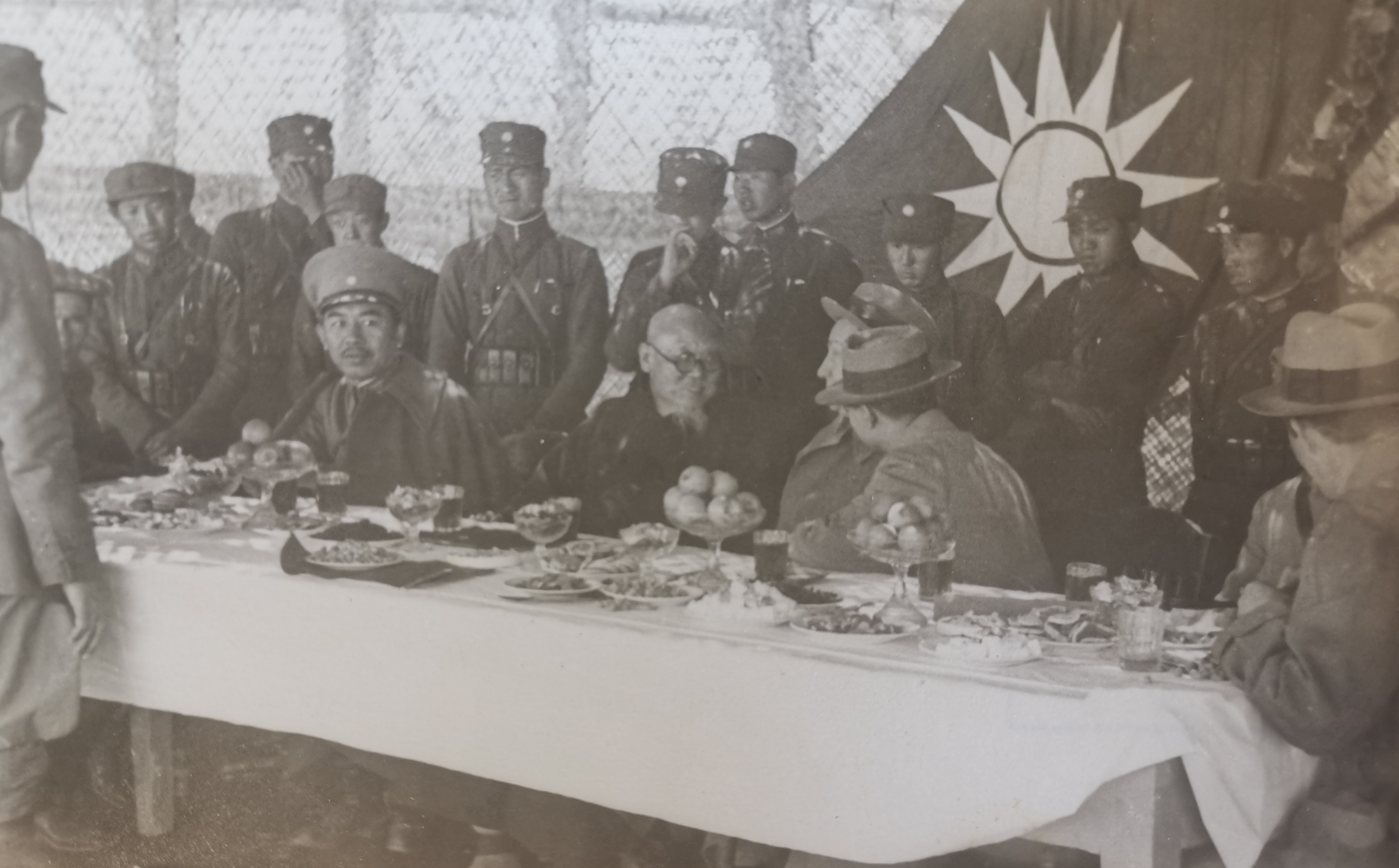
USSR Consul G. A. Apresov at an official reception in China (Xinjiang), 1934

== Work in China ==
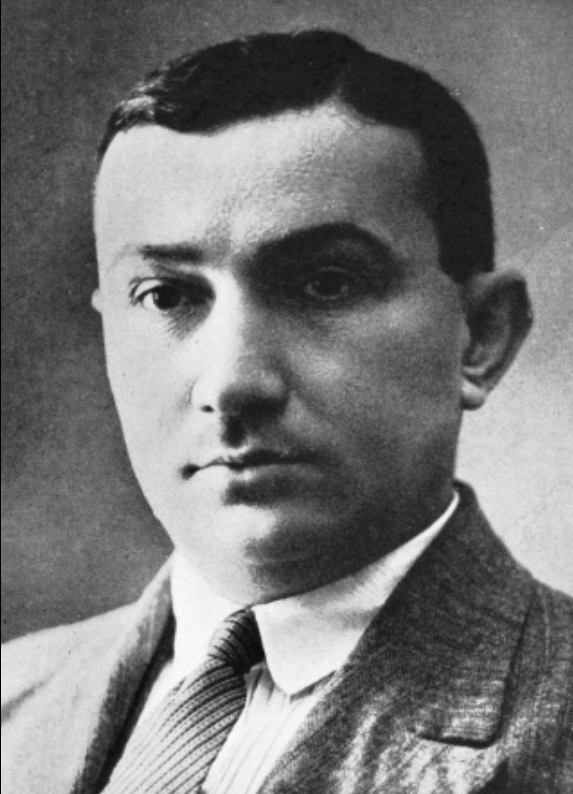
Consul General of the USSR in Urumqi G. A. Apresov.

In 1933, Apresov was appointed Consul General of the USSR with special powers in Urumqi, Xinjiang, China. According to some sources, he was also a resident of the INO OGPU.

The 1930s were marked by a period of close cooperation between the USSR and the government of Sheng Shicai in Xinjiang, which ensured Xinjiang's de facto protectorate status under the auspices of the USSR. Following his appointment, Apresov soon became the "grey cardinal" in Sheng Shicai's court and the primary operator of Soviet policy in Xinjiang; he personally participated in the political reorganization of the entire region and oversaw military and economic aid to the region.

According to Sheng's adjutant, Zhao Jiangfeng, during the Islamic field commander Ma Zhongying's offensive on Urumqi in the winter of 1933–34, Sheng summoned Apresov every day or two at night for meetings, urging him to expedite the introduction of Soviet troops. Apresov did indeed play a key role in that crisis: in January 1934, Red Army units were secretly introduced into Xinjiang, disguised as the "Altai Volunteer Army." The operation was led by the head of the GUPO and V/OGPU, M. P. Frinovsky, with whom Apresov had had a hostile relationship since both of their time working in Baku in 1930. Thanks to Apresov's efforts and the large-scale Soviet intervention, by the spring of 1934, the threat of Sheng Shicai's fall had been removed, and Soviet influence in the region had reached its peak.

Apresov acted as the Kremlin's trusted intermediary in dialogue with Sheng Shicai, conveying to him the position of the USSR's top leadership. Thus, on July 27, 1934, Stalin, Molotov, and Voroshilov sent Apresov a coded telegram with detailed instructions for Sheng Shicai. In this message, through the consul, they assured the Xinjiang ruler that "the USSR stands firmly and unwaveringly on the integrity of China and has no territorial claims, either direct or indirect, against China."

Apresov established himself as one of the key intermediaries in resolving the crises in Xinjiang. In 1933, he organized negotiations between Sheng Shicai and the Uyghur leader Khoja Niyaz, which led to the conclusion of an alliance agreement and altered the balance of power in the region. Later, in 1936, Apresov personally met in Kashgar with the military commander Mahmut Muhiti and dissuaded him from attempting to proclaim an independent Uyghur state, insisting instead on cooperation with Sheng Shicai’s pro-Soviet government.

At the same time, Apresov advocated for more active representation of the various ethnic groups of Xinjiang in local government bodies. According to some estimates, it was Apresov who could have contributed to the introduction of the concept of "Uyghur" as an ethnonym for the indigenous sedentary Turkic-speaking Muslims of southern and eastern Xinjiang, which was in line with the Soviet practice of nation-building.

Soviet representatives played a key role in the governance of the region. Three waves of Soviet emissaries (1931, 1935, and 1936), consisting mainly of Han Chinese living in the USSR, joined the Xinjiang secret police, the People's Anti-Imperialist Association (created by the initiative of Apresov), the Border Affairs Department (which also dealt with intelligence), and other important institutions. This allowed the USSR to exercise significant influence over the governance of the province, and Sheng was often forced to appoint Soviet-trained emissaries to high positions. This activity was coordinated by G.A. Apresov. At a meeting in July 1935, Soviet representatives declared their intention to eliminate Sheng if necessary if he no longer met Soviet interests.

Apresov also actively advocated for the accelerated development of Xinjiang's rich natural resources (especially oil). In the summer or early September 1935, while on vacation in the USSR, he discussed this topic with Stalin at his dacha in Sochi. On September 4, 1935, Stalin wrote to Molotov and Kaganovich from Sochi to Moscow: “Shouldn’t we ensure that the USSR is represented in Xinjiang only by Apresov, and that our Chekists in Xinjiang refuse to manage and obey Apresov in everything?”.

On September 10, 1935, Apresov became the Commissioner of the Central Committee of the All-Union Communist Party of Bolsheviks, whose tasks included ensuring that representatives of all departments including the NKVD and NKO pursue a single line; employees of other people's commissariats were prohibited from taking any actions that had or could have political significance for the USSR and the line being pursued in Xinjiang without the prior permission of the Commissioner of the Central Committee. Apresov was also given the authority to remove from office and send back to the USSR any Soviet workers in Xinjiang. On September 13, 1935, on the proposal of Molotov, Kaganovich, and Voroshilov, approved by Stalin, Apresov was awarded the Order of Lenin (without publication in print).

As a result of the new approvement, Apresov found himself under dual operational subordination - to the People's Commissariat of Foreign Affairs and the Central Committee of the All-Union Communist Party (Bolsheviks). This state of affairs could not please the People's Commissar for Foreign Affairs M. M. Litvinov, who was forced to repeatedly appeal to Stalin with requests to influence his subordinate, who was inclined to explicitly lead the local Chinese authorities. "Although Apresov is listed as a plenipotentiary representative," the People's Commissar wrote to Stalin in December 1936, "he is actually outside my influence, so instructions from me will not achieve their goal." Similarly, the USSR’s plenipotentiary representative in China, D. V. Bogomolov (ru:Богомолов, Дмитрий Васильевич (дипломат) ), repeatedly reported to Moscow that Apresov was not accepting his instructions.

Apresov wielded so much power in Xinjiang that he became generally known as "Tsar" Apresoff. Thus, the British Lieutenant Colonel R. Schomberg noted in this regard: "In a city like Urumqi, the central figure is the Soviet consul. What he does, what he says, what he thinks, where he is going - his every action is of great interest to everyone."

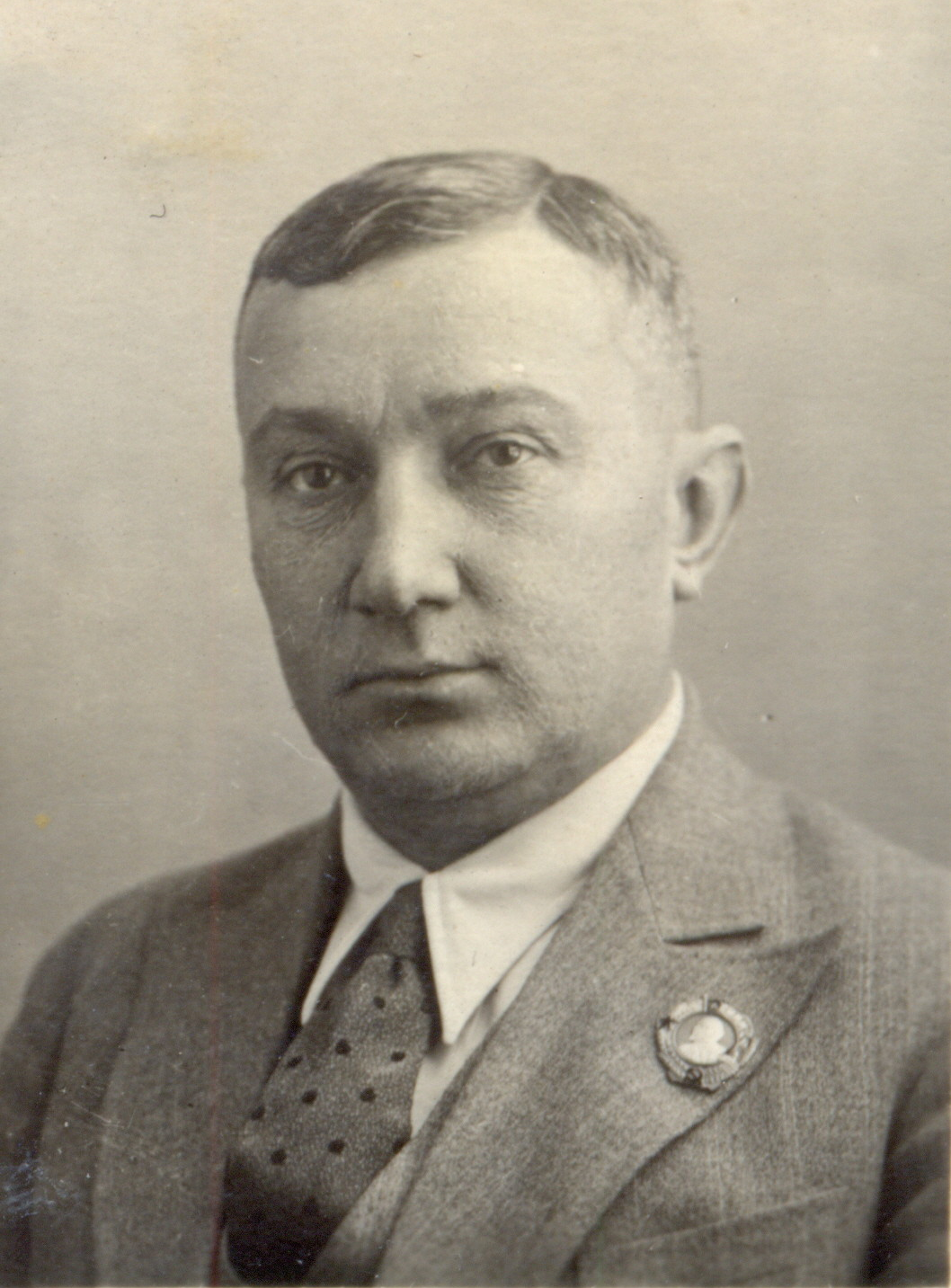
Soviet diplomat Garegin Apresov

From 1935 to 1936 he was Chief of the Second Eastern Department of the People's Commissariat of Foreign Affairs of the Soviet Union (NKID).

There is a known story of Apresov’s involvement in the fate of Yu Xiusong, one of the first members of the Chinese Communist Party and Comintern figure. In the summer of 1935, Yu Xiusong arrived in Xinjiang from the USSR (under the pseudonym Wang Shouchen), after which Apresov reorganized the People's Anti-Imperialist Association, with Yu Xiusong heading its secretariat. Chinese statesman Burgan Shahidi, who was deputy governor of Xinjiang during this period, wrote in his memoirs that Apresov met with him and Yu Xiusong, issuing directives to cooperate in all matters from now on.

Soon, Yu Xiusong became romantically involved with Sheng Shitong, Sheng Shicai's younger sister. However, their relationship encountered resistance from Sheng’s family, especially her brother, who doubted the advisability of this union. Apresov played a key role in overcoming these obstacles — he personally intervened to convince Sheng Shicai to agree to the wedding. In 1936, a lavish ceremony took place, attended by high-ranking officials, including representatives of the Soviet side. A documentary film was made about the event, which was then shown to Stalin. Through Apresov, Stalin gave the newlyweds a box of clothes as a gift. However, in 1937, Yu Xiusong was arrested on charges of belonging to Trotskyists and sent to the USSR, where he was later executed. The arrest was initiated by the former head of the Main Directorate of Border and Internal Security (GUPVO) of the NKVD, M. P. Frinovsky, who by that time had become the first deputy of the NKVD People's Commissar N. I. Yezhov and took an active part in organizing political repressions (on November 28, 1937, Frinovsky sent a special message to Stalin regarding Yu Xiusiong; also that same month, Apresov, who had been arrested by that time, was twice included in Stalin's execution lists under the 1st category, but was not executed).

According to some reports, while working in China during his stay in the USSR, Apresov met with Stalin at his dacha in Moscow, where Stalin offered him a diplomatic post in Paris, and Apresov, in turn, expressed a desire to remain in the USSR. The exact date of this event is unknown. Swedish traveler Sven Hedin, who met with Apresov in Urumqi, also noted his desire to return to the USSR.

== Opinions of contemporaries ==
During Apresov's work in Persia, he was described by British diplomats as an energetic communist worker and ardent propagandist. Their reports also included the epithet "the notorious Armenian communist." On the other hand, the British envoy to Persia, Percy Loraine, remarked about Apresov that if he were given enough rope, he would hang himself. This English idiom means that some people need only be given freedom to act in order to compromise or ruin themselves through their own mistakes.

According to British intelligence reports from 1922, while serving as Deputy People's Commissar of Justice of the Azerbaijan SSR in 2021, Apresov "was often instrumental in obtaining the remission of sentences of death imposed by the Extraordinary Commission in Baku".

The defector G. S. Agabekov noted Apresov’s love of adventure and risk, as well as his value as an intelligence officer. Iranian figure Abol Hassan Ebtehaj mentioned that Apresov was "a very, very bold person and interfered in everything."

In 1927, the USSR Plenipotentiary Representative in Persia K. K. Yurenev described Apresov as follows:

A peculiar worker. A capable person, but a great advertiser, with a certain adventurism bias. Likes to pull the wool over people's eyes. Knows Persian well and knows people; an excellent intelligence officer; knows how to position himself. He can be put to serious work. The Central Control Commission once decided to fire him. Friction with the authorities and with Reza. Domineering. Needs to be closer to party organizations. Politically prepared.

There are reviews of Apresov from European travelers. For example, Swedish traveler Sven Hedin, who met Apresov in Urumqi, described him as an open, good-natured and cheerful person with a good sense of humor. Apresov significantly helped Hedin in obtaining permits from the Chinese authorities to organize his expedition. Hedin claimed that Apresov wielded more power in Xinjiang than Governor Shen Shicai. According to Hedin, Apresov saved the entire expedition, and possibly his own life. Hedin was also warmly received at the USSR Consulate General, and a large banquet was organized in honor of the meeting.

English traveler and diplomat Eric Teichman was also warmly received at the USSR Consulate General and even participated in the lavish 12-hour celebration of October Revolution Day, which ended with a screening of a Soviet film about Chapayev. Teichman noted the exceptional hospitality of Apresov and his staff. After Apresov was arrested by NKVD officers in 1937, he was, among others, accused of espionage with Teichman.

== Arrest and death ==
In 1937, another uprising broke out in Xinjiang. Shen Shicai, aware that the Soviet leadership could harshly reprimand him for his failures in suppressing it, portrayed the rebellion as the work of mythical Trotskyists led by Apresov, whose goal was to separate Xinjiang from the Soviet Union. Moreover, a secret personal message was delivered to Moscow by the dupan's brother, Shen Shiqi. A total of 435 people were allegedly involved in the conspiracy. Shen Shicai launched his own purge in Xinjiang, with assistance from the NKVD.

On May 4, 1937, at a trade union plenum in Urumqi, Apresov came under organized pressure; at the meeting, a characterization of Apresov, written in a critical tone, was presented by the vice-consul in Urumqi and an employee of the Soviet special services, I. T. Orelsky (Bovkun) (ru:Луганец-Орельский, Иван Трофимович), who two years later, in the summer of 1939, himself, along with his wife, fell victim to an extrajudicial execution (killed with a hammer and/or strangled by NKVD officers).

Apresov was subsequently recalled from China, and on June 13, 1937, he was dismissed from the USSR People's Commissariat of Foreign Affairs. Following this, on July 6, 1937, he was arrested, and his Moscow apartment was searched. During the search, among other things, the Order of Lenin, a Mauser pistol, and 90 rounds of ammunition were seized.

A request addressed to NKVD People's Commissar N. I. Yezhov to authorize Apresov's arrest (with the wording: "engaged in espionage for England") was drafted by Deputy NKVD People's Commissar L. N. Belsky (ru:Бельский, Лев Николаевич ). The search warrant was issued on July 6, 1937, by two individuals whose names were not listed on the warrant, and whose signatures were illegible. The first of them was the Deputy People's Commissar of the NKVD, a first-rank state security commissar, and the second was the head of the Second Department of the GUGB NKVD, a third-rank state security commissar. Apparently, these were Ya. S. Agranov and N. G. Nikolaev-Zhurid (ru:Николаев-Журид, Николай Галактионович ).

During his arrest, Apresov was charged with concealing the fact that his wife's relative, the doctor A. B. Balayan, was a defector who remained in Persia. Apresov responded by stating that Balayan was not his relative, which is why he had not disclosed this fact. It is known that earlier, on October 14, 1936, Ya. A. Einhorn, a representative of the USSR People's Commissariat of Foreign Affairs in the Uzbek SSR, presented information to the Central Committee of the All-Union Communist Party (Bolsheviks) regarding Apresov's connection with Balayan. Einhorn himself was executed in June 1938.

On July 15, 1937, Senior Lieutenant of State Security E. A. Ali issued a decree selecting a preventive measure for Apresov in the form of detention, as well as charging him under Articles 58-1, paragraph "a" and 58-6 of the Criminal Code of the RSFSR ("conducted espionage work for England"). This decree was formally approved by Deputy People's Commissar of the NKVD L. N. Belsky only on December 7, 1937.

After his arrest, Apresov was initially held in Butyrka prison, and his case was handled by NKVD investigators Senior Police Major T. M. Dyakov (ru:Дьяков, Таричан Михайлович ) and Senior Lieutenant of State Security E. A. Ali. He was accused of espionage for Britain, which he confessed to in the interrogation protocol of July 28, 1937, conducted by T. M. Dyakov. Apresov was also accused of financial fraud and collusion with Persian merchants during his underground work in Baku in 1919-1920 ("misappropriation of party funds"), to which he also confessed. During interrogation, Apresov also testified against a number of other individuals.

In November 1937, Apresov was twice included on Stalin's shooting lists for the first category, but he was not executed.

Apresov's interrogations continued until early January 1938. They included confessions and testimony against other people.

In March 1938, Apresov was included on Stalin's Category I execution lists for a third time, but he was again not executed. That same month, his brother S. A. Apresov was arrested in Baku and subsequently executed.

On June 20, 1938, investigator Ali was arrested.

On July 26, 1938, investigator Dyakov was arrested.

During interrogations, Dyakov testified against N. I. Yezhov's deputy, L. N. Belsky, who, according to him, gave instructions to extract a confession from G. A. Apresov. Dyakov's testimony also mentions that another deputy of N. I. Yezhov and one of the main architects of the "Great Terror," M. P. Frinovsky, showed particular interest in the investigation. Subsequently, all four—Ali, Dyakov, Belsky, and Frinovsky—were executed at various times.

On December 21, 1938, trainee investigator Demura of the 3rd Department of the GUGB NKVD, in the investigative unit, issued a decree stating that Apresov was last interrogated on January 4, 1938, and the protocol on the completion of the investigation was signed on January 28, 1938, "and since then, for unknown reasons, the case has been inactive for approximately 11 months." Due to the need for additional investigation and "to verify the veracity of Apresov's testimony," the investigator decided to file a petition with the USSR Prosecutor to extend the investigation and detention period for one month. This resolution was approved by V. G. Dekanozov, Deputy Chief of the GUGB NKVD. Similar decisions to extend the investigation period were subsequently made more than once. This period was characterized by the gradual winding down of the "Great Terror".

On January 11, 1939, the same investigator prepared another resolution, stating that Apresov had retracted his testimony in his statement of November 16, 1938, and during subsequent interrogations; "and to complete the investigation, it is necessary to process the materials received from the GUPVO" (the Main Directorate of Border and Internal Security of the NKVD of the USSR, headed by Frinovsky from 1933 to 1937) and "to determine the basis on which G.A. Apresov was arrested," as well as "to re-interrogate G.A. Apresov on the essence of the charges brought against him." The investigator decided to file a petition with the prosecutor to extend the investigation and detention period for two months.

On February 13, 1939, in the interrogation report conducted by investigator Demura, Apresov retracted his previous testimony. He accused investigators Dyakov and Ali of distorting his testimony and forcing him to sign "distorted testimony."

On February 14, 1939, the Party Control Commission of the Central Committee of the All-Union Communist Party (Bolsheviks) decided to expel Apresov from the party as an "enemy of the people."

On February 27, 1939, the investigation into Apresov's case was completed.

On March 10, 1939, the first session of the Military Collegium of the Supreme Court of the USSR was held, where Apresov's case was heard. During the session, Apresov denied his guilt, stating that his earlier confession was "a fabrication from beginning to end" and had been given under duress. The court ordered an additional investigation, after which Apresov was transferred to the Sukhanovskaya special-regime prison for especially important political prisoners, known for its extremely harsh treatment of them. His case was transferred to Junior Lieutenant of State Security Khitsenko, a junior investigator in the NKVD investigative unit. In Sukhanovskaya prison, Apresov was subjected to torture and ill-treatment and began to give a partial confession.

Thus, in the interrogation report of June 28-29, 1939, Apresov stated that he "decided to tell the investigation everything about the treasonous work" he allegedly carried out. According to the report, the interrogation lasted 16 hours—from 11 a.m. on June 28 to 3 a.m. on June 29. In the report of August 10, 1939, Apresov again confessed to working for British intelligence but categorically refused to admit to participating in a counter-revolutionary organization. He stated the following: "I carried out espionage work for England, but was not a member of a counter-revolutionary organization."

On August 10, 1939, a report was drawn up on the completion of the investigation. In it, Apresov fully confirmed all the testimony he had given to the investigation in 1939. Among other things, Apresov mentioned that White Guard figures Gmyrkin, Papengut, and "others" were executed in Xinjiang in early 1934 at his insistence.

On August 15, 1939, B.Z. Kobulov, deputy head of the NKVD investigative unit, approved the indictment against Apresov, which alleged that he maintained contact with British intelligence through the British engineers Sutedzhio and Stipvac. In reality, these were fictitious characters with fictitious names that contained a specific encrypted message. Apresov intentionally included them in his testimony, as he explained in his letter after the second session of the Military Collegium of the Supreme Court of the USSR on July 9, 1940.

On September 21, 1939, the arrested intelligence officer V. A. Ulmer (ru:Ульмер, Вольдемар Августович ) (a protégé of Frinovsky and former employee of the GUPVO) testified, accusing Apresov of maintaining an unacceptably commanding tone toward Shen Shicai, including publicly. Ulmer also claimed that Apresov, through his arbitrariness, contributed to the disorganization of the NKVD's work in Xinjiang, including the work of the residency under the leadership of GUPVO employee Dudikov, whom Apresov subordinated to his influence. Apresov's testimony suggests that he did indeed have antagonistic relationships with a number of NKVD officers serving in Xinjiang.

On July 9, 1940, the Military Collegium of the Supreme Court of the USSR held its second hearing on Apresov's case. Deputy Chairman of the Military Collegium I. O. Matulevich (ru:Матулевич, Иван Осипович ) presided over the trial. Apresov again pleaded not guilty at the hearing, stating that he had previously incriminated himself through the use of physical coercion. He pointed out the absurdity of the accusation of ties to British intelligence, given his successful struggle against British influence in Xinjiang. Thus, Apresov stated the following: "Between December 1933 and January 1934, at my insistence, 60 British agents were arrested in Xinjiang" and "under my leadership, a coup d'état was carried out in the government in Xinjiang."

Apresov then accused M. P. Frinovsky of slander, with whom he had had a strained relationship since both of them worked in Baku in 1930. By that time, Frinovsky and his family had already been subjected to repression and executed, and before that, Frinovsky himself had also been imprisoned in Sukhanovo Prison. At the court hearing, Apresov stated the following:

I am the victim of Frinovsky's slander. He is taking revenge on me because in 1930, in Baku, I filed a complaint accusing him of anti-Party activity with the Central Committee of the AKP(b). Even then, he created the so-called "Tick" case against me, but I was rehabilitated. Having become Yezhov's deputy, Frinovsky systematically undermined my work and was the one who secured the decision to recall me from Xinjiang.

Apresov also stated that as a result of the physical abuse in Sukhanovo Prison, his teeth were knocked out and he became deaf in one ear. In his closing statement, Apresov stated:

I am the victim of Frinovsky's slander, who slandered me out of personal vendetta. I was loyal to Soviet power and will remain so for the rest of my life.

I plead guilty only to the fact that I could not withstand the beatings during the preliminary investigation and gave false testimony. If they beat me again, I will again confirm my previous testimony. I told the court only the truth.

Our court is harsh, but also fair. I expect a fair decision in my case.

Nevertheless, after a 40-minute deliberation, Apresov was sentenced to 10 years' imprisonment on charges of anti-Soviet activity under Article 58-1, paragraph "a" of the Criminal Code of the RSFSR. However, charges under Articles 58-8 and 58-11 were dropped against Apresov ("not proven").

This sentence seemed comparatively lenient by the standards of the era and given the gravity of the charges. Both sessions of the Military Collegium of the Supreme Court of the USSR in Apresov's case lasted unusually long, which stood out from the practice of the time, when the consideration of cases by this court typically took about fifteen minutes and almost invariably resulted in the imposition of a death sentence. Furthermore, the length of the investigation in Apresov's case was unusually long for the times of the repressions. He was included three times on Stalin's execution lists under the first category. During the investigation, Apresov was held in Butyrka, Sukhanovo, and Lefortovo prisons, as well as in the NKVD internal prison. Three of Yezhov's deputies to the NKVD People's Commissar were involved in one way or another in the Apresov case: Frinovsky, Belsky, and Agranov.

On the day of the sentencing, after the court hearing, Apresov wrote a letter to the Chairman of the Military Collegium of the Supreme Court of the USSR, in which he stated that "being in a heightened state of nervousness," he had overlooked in his testimony at the trial and in his closing argument "extremely important circumstances of the case" proving that he "was forced under torture and ill-treatment to incriminate himself." This evidence consisted of the fact that in his testimony during the preliminary investigation, he had deliberately introduced fictitious foreign agents with unusual names, which in Armenian, Persian, and Turkmen mean "Forced Untruth," "All Untruth," "Pure Untruth," and "Big Untruth." Geographical locations that do not exist in reality were also introduced into the testimony. Apresov called for an assessment of these circumstances and a further investigation. In his letter, he stated:

My conscience is clear, and receiving 10 years in prison for the fact that I couldn't withstand the torture and abuse due to my health is a severe punishment. I am Frinovsky's victim—I ask that you allow me to prove it.

This letter from Apresov had no visible consequences.

During his imprisonment, Apresov was only allowed to see his wife once, during which she saw that his teeth had indeed been knocked out.

In 1941, during the attack of Nazi Germany on the USSR, G. A. Apresov was in prison in the city of Oryol. From the very beginning of the war, the Oryol region was declared under martial law. All cases of crimes against defense, public order and state security were transferred to military tribunals, which received the right to consider cases after 24 hours from the moment the indictment was served. On 8 September 1941, on the basis of Decree No. GKO-634ss, without initiating a criminal case and conducting preliminary and trial proceedings, the Military Collegium of the Supreme Court of the USSR, chaired by Vasiliy Ulrikh (members of the collegium D. Ya. Kandibin (ru:Кандыбин, Дмитрий Яковлевич ) and Vasiliy Bukanov (ru:Буканов, Василий Васильевич )), sentenced Apresov and 161 prisoners of the Oryol Prison to death penalty under Art. 58-10 RSFSR Penal Code. He was shot on 11 September 1941 in the Medvedev Forest near Oryol, in an event known as the Medvedev Forest massacre. The execution was initiated by the People's Commissar of Internal Affairs of the USSR L. P. Beria and sanctioned by the State Defense Committee of the USSR headed by J. V. Stalin. All those sentenced were accused of "conducting defeatist agitation and attempts to prepare escapes for the resumption of subversive work." The list of 170 prisoners held in Oryol Prison was compiled by the NKVD's 1st Special Department under Kobulov's direction and with his direct participation. It was Kobulov who made various notes on the list and determined the fate of each prisoner.

G. A. Apresov was rehabilitated in 1956.

Most of the NKVD officers who participated in the investigation and repressions against Garegin Apresov themselves became victims of Stalin’s purges.

== Fate of Apresov’s circle ==
In his autobiographies, Garegin Apresov mentioned prominent functionaries Akmal Ikramov, Fayzulla Khodjaev, Levon Mirzoyan, and Mir Jafar Baghirov as individuals who could confirm his reliability as a party worker and member. All of these individuals, except Baghirov, were also shot during the repressions. Overall, most of the party leaders, commissars, and revolutionaris mentioned by Apresov in his autobiographies were arrested during the "Great Terror" of 1937–1938 on charges of counterrevolutionary activity, Trotskyism, and nationalism. Many were sentenced to death and posthumously rehabilitated only in the postwar years. Against this backdrop, only a few of the figures in his autobiographies escaped repression, continued their professional work, and died of natural causes. Their activities were likely technical or scientific, rather than political.

== Family ==
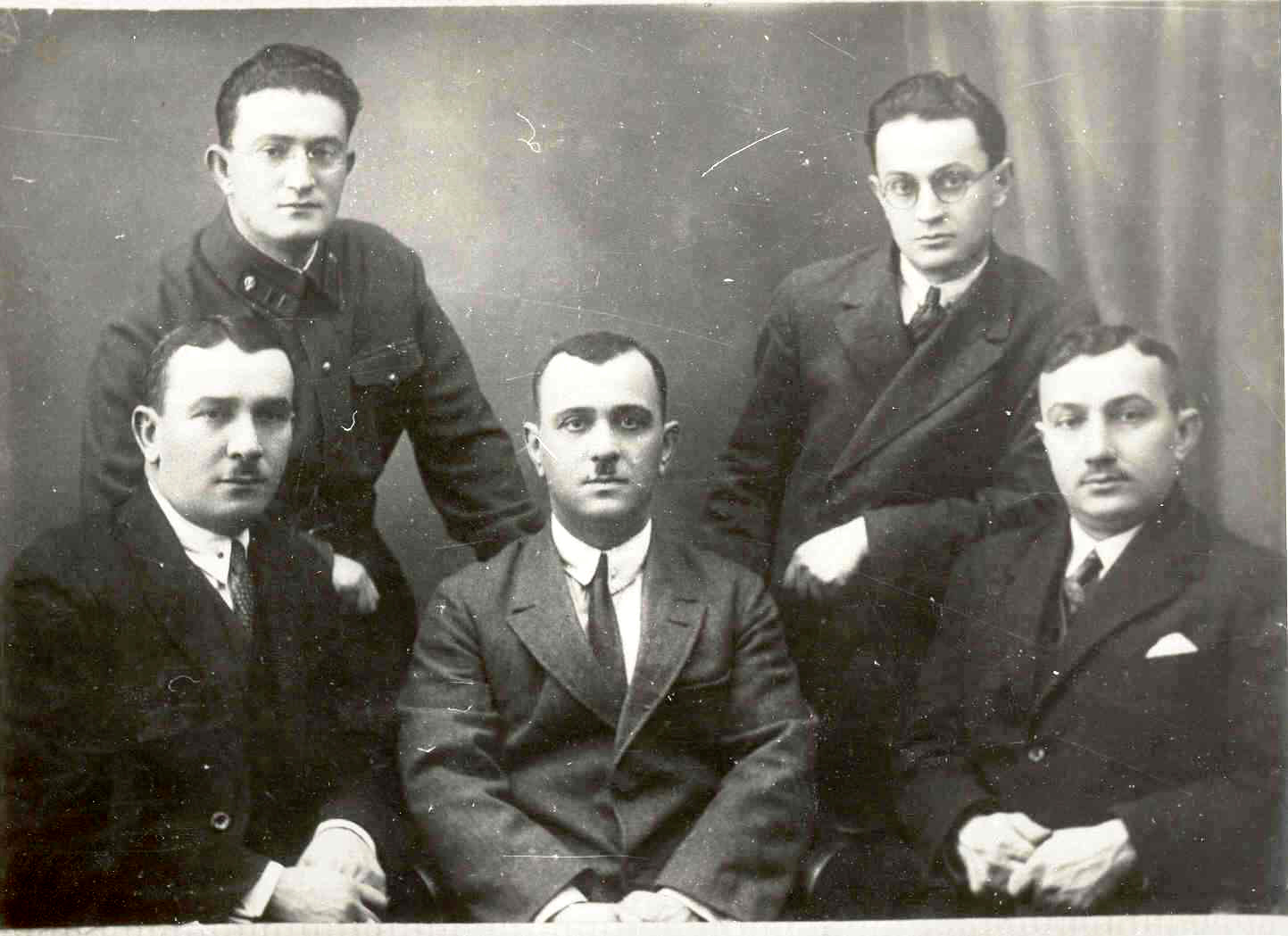
Apresov brothers. From left to right - standing - Sergei Abramovich and Gurgen Abramovich. Sitting: Grigory Abramovich, Konstantin Abramovich and Garegin Abramovich. 1930

Wife - Lidiya Artemyevna Apresova

Brother - Sergei Abramovich Apresov (10.1.1895, Baku - 4.7.1938) - graduate of the Military Medical Academy, head of the hospital in Baku. He was arrested on March 3, 1938, and charged under Art. 21/64, 21/70, 73, 72 of the Criminal Code of the AzSSR by the Military Collegium of the Supreme Court of the USSR (in the same month, Garegin Apresov was included in Stalin's execution lists for the third time). On July 4, 1938, he was sentenced to capital punishment and shot on the same day. S. A. Apresov was rehabilitated by the Military Collegium of the Supreme Court of the USSR on April 14, 1956, for lack of corpus delicti.

Brother - Konstantin Abramovich Apresov

Brother - Tsovak Abramovich Apresov

Brother - Gurgen Abramovich Apresov

Brother - Grigory Abramovich Apresov

== In literature ==
- Tatiana Ovanessoff's novel "Spy's apprentice: a novel inspired by true events in Persia".

- Alexander Gorokhov's novel "Employee of the Foreign Department of the NKVD".
