= Jin Shuren =

Warlord of the Xinjiang Province of China

- 金樹仁

Provincial Chairman of Xinjiang
- In office 7 July 1928 – 14 April 1933
- Preceded by: Yang Zengxin (as Provincial Governor)
- Succeeded by: Liu Wenlong

Commander-in-Chief of Xinjiang
- In office 7 July 1928 – 14 April 1933
- Preceded by: Yang Zengxin (as Military Governor)
- Succeeded by: Sheng Shicai (as Military Governor)

Provincial Commissioner for Civil Affairs of Xinjiang
- In office 1927–1928

Personal details
- Born: c. 1883 Tao-ho, Gansu, Qing Empire
- Died: 1941

Military service
- Allegiance: China
- Years of service: 1928–1933
- Rank: Provincial Commander-in-Chief

Jin Shuren (traditional Chinese: 金樹仁; simplified Chinese: 金树仁; pinyin: Jīn Shùrén; Wade–Giles: Chin Shu-jen; c. 1883–1941) was a Chinese warlord of the Xinjiang clique who served as Governor of Xinjiang between 1928 and 1933.

== Biography ==
Jin Shuren was born in Yongjing, Hezhou, Gansu. He graduated at the Gansu provincial academy and then served as the Principal at the provincial normal school. He entered the Imperial Civil Service, where he got the attention of Yang Zengxin, at the time District Magistrate of Hezhou. When Yang was appointed Governor of Xinjiang in 1908, Jin followed him as a county/district magistrate. After the collapse of the Qing dynasty in 1911, Jin rose through the ranks during Yang's absolute rule over Xinjiang. In 1927 he was named Provincial Commissioner for Civil Affairs in Ürümqi, a post which he held until Yang's assassination in July 1928.

After taking Yang's post, Jin sent a telegram to Nanking asking for Kuomintang's recognition of his new post. Kuomintang had no other choice but to recognise Jin as a new governor, but under new terminology, he was recognised as Provincial Chairman and Commander-in-Chief, unlike his predecessor Yang who held the titles of Provincial Governor and Military Governor.

Immediately after taking power, Jin took steps to strengthen his power by increasing the secret police, doubling the salaries of the army and police and introducing new uniforms. The army was later expanded and new weapons were acquired. The administrative system remained almost unchanged, while Jin employed the practice of his predecessor of appointing relatives and fellow provincials. Subsequently, former Yunnan officials, both Han and Hui were replaced by Han from Gansu, especially from the region of Hezhou, the hometown of Jin. He appointed his brother Jin Shuhsin as Provincial Commissioner for Military Affairs. Another brother Jin Shuchih was given a senior military post in Kashgar.

Jin expanded Yang's system of internal surveillance and censorship. Besides increasing the strength of both secret and ordinary police, he introduced internal passports which gave him greater control over internal travels thus tightening internal security, as well as giving additional source of revenue for his administration. Traveling outside the province became almost impossible.

In 1932, the French Yellow Expedition passed through Xinjiang. Jin's provincial authorities hindered their advance. Jin's rule of Xinjiang for about a half-decade was characterized by strife caused by corruption, suppression and disruption. Conflicts intensified and resulted in numerous riots against his regime and his eventual downfall. Jin confiscated local lands for redistribution, but he gave these lands to his personal associates. In April 1933 Jin's White Russian troops (naturalized army, 归化军) changed allegiance, encouraged revolt in Xinjiang, ended his reign and forced him to flee to the USSR. He was succeeded by Sheng Shicai.

Jin incurred the wrath of the Kuomintang (KMT) when, without approval, he signed an arms treaty with the Soviet Union. The Tungan Hui General Ma Zhongying allied himself with the KMT and his troops became the 36th Division of the National Revolutionary Army (NRA). Ma was ordered to overthrow Jin. Jin, however, was overthrown after the First Battle of Urumqi (1933) by White Russian troops under Colonel Pavel Pappengut. When he returned to China in October 1933 he was arrested by the KMT, brought to trial in March 1935 and sentenced to three and a half years imprisonment. However, the KMT pardoned him on 10 October 1935, and he was released from prison the next day.
