= Sheng Shicai =

Chinese warlord (1895–1970)

- 盛世才
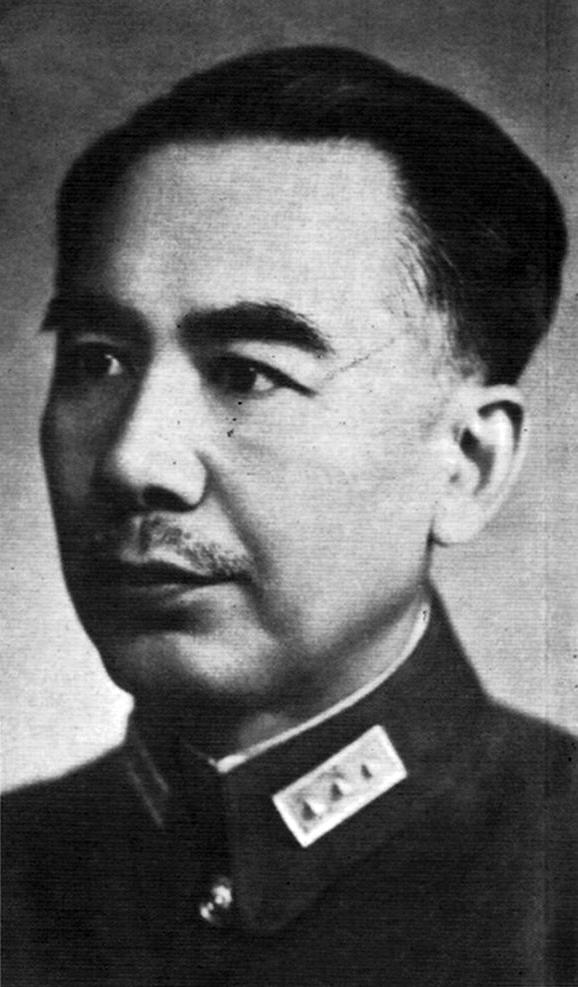
- Governor Sheng Shicai in the National Revolutionary Army general's uniform

Duban (Military Governor) of Xinjiang
- In office 14 April 1933 – 29 August 1944
- Preceded by: Jin Shuren (as Commander-in-Chief)
- Succeeded by: Office abolished

Provincial Chairman of Xinjiang
- In office 4 April 1940 – 29 August 1944
- Preceded by: Li Rong
- Succeeded by: Wu Zhongxin

Minister of Agriculture and Forestry
- In office 29 August 1944 – 30 July 1945
- President: Chiang Kai-shek
- Prime Minister: Chiang Kai-shek (1944–1945) T.V. Soong (1945)

Personal details
- Born: 3 December 1895 Kaiyuan, Manchuria, Qing China
- Died: 13 July 1970 (aged 74) Tri-Service General Hospital, Taipei, Republic of China
- Party: Kuomintang (1942–1970)
- Other political affiliations: People's Anti-Imperialist Association (1935–1942) Communist Party of the Soviet Union (1938–1942)
- Spouse: Qiu Yufang
- Relations: Guo Songling (father-in-law) Yu Xiusong (brother-in-law)
- Children: 4
- Education: Imperial Japanese Army Academy
- Nickname: King of Xinjiang

Military service
- Allegiance: Republic of China (1919–1933) Xinjiang clique (1933–1942) Republic of China (1942–1949)
- Branch/service: Guominjun (1927–1933) Anti-Imperialist Army (1933–1942) National Revolutionary Army Ground Forces (1942–1949)
- Years of service: 1919–1949
- Rank: General
- Commands: Xinjiang Frontier Army Anti-Imperialist Army Republic of China NRA 8th War Area
- Battles/wars: Northern Expedition; Kumul Rebellion; First Battle of Ürümqi; Second Battle of Ürümqi; Soviet invasion of Xinjiang; Islamic rebellion of 1937

Chinese name
- Chinese: 盛世才
Transcriptions
Standard Mandarin
- Hanyu Pinyin: Shèng Shìcái
- Wade–Giles: Sheng^{4} Shih^{4}-ts'ai^{2}

Sheng Shicai (Chinese: 盛世才; 3 December 1895 – 13 July 1970) was a Chinese warlord who ruled the province of Xinjiang from 1933 to 1944.

He was a Manchurian-born Han Chinese, educated in Tokyo, Empire of Japan, where he studied political economy and later attended the Imperial Japanese Army Academy. Sheng had become a Marxist in his youth, and after returning to China he participated in the anti-imperialist May Fourth Movement in 1919. In 1927, he joined the Northern Expedition, a military campaign of the Kuomintang against the Beiyang government.

In 1929, he was called into service of the Governor of Xinjiang, Jin Shuren, where he served as Chief of Staff of the Frontier Military and Chief Instructor at the Provincial Military College. With the Kumul Rebellion ongoing, Jin was overthrown in a coup d'état on 12 April 1933 and Sheng was appointed duban or Military Governor of Xinjiang. Since then, he led a power struggle against his rivals, of whom Ma Zhongying and Zhang Peiyuan were most notable. The first to be removed were the coup leaders and by them appointed Civil Governor Liu Wenlong by September 1933. Ma and Zhang were defeated militarily by June 1934 with help from the Soviet Union, whom Sheng invited to intervene, subordinating himself to the Soviets in return. He was dubbed the "King of Xinjiang" during his rule.

As ruler of Xinjiang, Sheng implemented his Soviet-inspired policies through his political program of Six Great Policies, adopted in December 1934. His rule was marked by his nationality policy which promoted national and religious equality and identity of various nationalities of Xinjiang. The province saw a process of modernization, but also the subordination of economic interests in Soviet favor. The Soviets had a monopoly over Xinjiang trade and exploited its rare materials and oil. In 1937, in parallel with the Soviet Great Purge, Sheng conducted a purge on his own, executing, torturing to death and imprisoning 100,000 people.

With the Soviets distracted by its war with Germany, Sheng approached the Nationalist Chinese government in July 1942 and expelled the Soviet military and technical personnel. However, he still maintained effective power over Xinjiang. In the meantime, the Soviets managed to hold off the Germans and the Japanese launched an extensive offensive against the Chinese, which led Sheng to try to change sides again by arresting the Kuomintang officials and invoking Soviet intervention for the second time in 1944. The Soviets ignored the request and the Chinese government removed him from the post naming him Minister of Agriculture and Forestry in August 1944.

Sheng held the ministerial post by July 1945 and later worked as an adviser to Hu Zongnan and held a military post. He joined the rest of the Kuomintang in Taiwan after the defeat in the Chinese Civil War in 1949. In Taiwan, Sheng lived in a comfortable retirement and died in Taipei in 1970.

== Early life ==
Sheng, an ethnic Han Chinese, was born in Kaiyuan, Manchuria, in a well-to-do peasant family on 3 December 1895. His great-grandfather, Sheng Fuxin (盛福信), was originally from Shandong Province and later fled to Kaiyuan. Sheng enrolled at the Provincial Forestry and Agricultural School in Mukden, aged 14. Aged 17, Sheng enrolled at the Wusong Public School in Shanghai, where he studied political science and economy. There, he became friendly with students and teachers of "radical inclinations". After graduating in 1915, under their advice he went to study in Tokyo, Empire of Japan. There, Sheng enrolled at the Waseda University, where he studied political economy for a year. During that time, Sheng expressed nationalistic attitudes and was exposed to The ABC of Communism (Chinese: 共产主义ABC\) and other leftist publications.

Unrest in China made him return to homeland. In 1919, he participated in the May Fourth Movement as a representative of the Liaoning students. During this period, he developed radical and anti-Japanese sentiments. By his own admission, Sheng became a Marxist the very same year and his political opponents claimed he became a communist during his second stay in Japan in the 1920s. During that time, he realised the "futility of book learning", and decided to enter a military career. He took military training in the southern province of Kwantung, known for liberal and reformist views. Later, he enrolled at the Northeastern Military Academy.

Sheng entered military service under Guo Songling, Deputy of Zhang Zuolin, a Manchurian warlord. He rapidly rose to become Staff Officer with the rank of lieutenant colonel, and was given command of a company. Because of his commendable service, Guo sponsored his admission to the Imperial Japanese Army Academy for advanced military studies. Three years later he completed his studies, with minor interruptions in 1925, when he was involved in Manchurian politics.

At that time, Sheng supported a campaign against Zhang, briefly returning to Manchuria. Although he supported the anti-Zhang coup, he was able to return to Japan with the support of Feng Yuxiang and Chiang Kai-Shek, from whom he received financial help and considered him as his patron.

Sheng returned from Japan in 1927 to participate in the Northern Expedition A rising young officer, Sheng was given the rank of colonel and served as a Staff Officer of the Chiang's field headquarters under He Yingqin. During the Northern Expedition, Sheng proved himself as a worthy officer, serving in various command staff capacities.

Sheng was a member of the Guominjun, a leftist nationalist faction that supported the Nationalist government in China. However, Sheng did not join the Kuomintang because of his belief in Marxism. After the Expedition was completed, he was made chief of the war operations section of the general staff in Nanjing, but resigned in 1929 over a disagreement with his superiors. After the apparent setback in his career, Sheng dedicated himself to the question of strengthening China's border defences.

== Power struggle ==
=== Rise to power ===
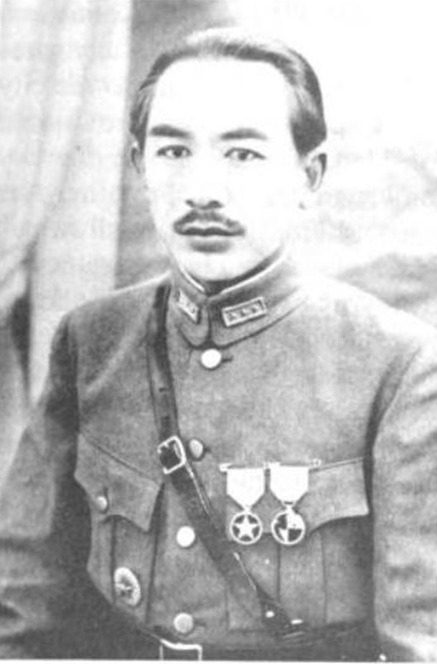
Sheng Shicai in c. 1928

Not long after Sheng's resignation, a delegation from Xinjiang came to Nanjing to ask for financial aid. The Governor of Xinjiang Jin Shuren asked one of the members of the delegation, the Deputy General Secretary of Xinjiang Guang Lu, to find a competent officer to reorganise the provincial military. After discreet enquiries, Sheng was appointed to Jin's staff and arrived in Xinjiang via Soviet Union in the winter of 1929–30. Chiang Kai-Shek may have endorsed Sheng's decision to go to Xinjiang. Therefore, the appointment of Ma Zhongying, Sheng's rival, as a commander of the 36th Division in Xinjiang embarrassed and frustrated Sheng. Sheng's welcome in Xinjiang was cold. Jin considered him a potential threat. Despite the doubts, Jin appointed him Chief of Staff of the Frontier Army and subsequently named him Chief Instructor at the Provincial Military College.

In the summer of 1932, the fighting between Ma and Jin had significantly intensified. Ma's Hui forces were able to break the defence lines at Hami and enter Xinjiang through the Hexi Corridor. In December 1932, Ma's forces started the siege of Ürümqi, but the White Russians and Sheng's troops successfully defended the city. In March 1933, the Manchurian Salvation Army, part of the National Revolutionary Army (NRA), came to their aid through the Soviet territory. During these events, Jin's prestige declined and correspondingly Sheng became increasingly popular. The culmination was the coup staged by the White Russians and a group of provincial bureaucrats led by Chen Zhong, Tao Mingyue and Li Xiaotian on 12 April 1933, who overthrew Jin, who escaped to China proper via Siberia.

Sheng, who was marshalling the provincial forces in eastern Xinjiang, returned to Ürümqi to seize power in the midst of the chaos. Without conferring the Chinese government, the coup leaders appointed Sheng the Commissioner of the Xinjiang Border Defence, i. e., Military Governor or duban on 14 April 1933, resurrecting the old title. Liu Wenlong, a powerless provincial bureaucrat was installed as the Civil Governor.

=== Rivalry with Ma and Zhang ===
Sheng's appointment as duban did not mean that his position was secured. Installment of Wenlong as governor meant that the bureaucrats had the upper hand over Sheng, whom they considered their protege. His position was also challenged by Ma, as well as Zhang Peiyuan, Jin's old ally and a commander of the Yining region. The Chinese government, having learned that Zhang refused to cooperate with the new regime in Xinjiang and that Ma's forces represented the gravest threat to the new regime, tried to take the advantage of the situation and take control over the province. Without clearly stating whether it recognized the changes in Xinjiang, the government appointed Huang Musong, then a Deputy Chief of General Staff, a "pacification commissioner" in May 1933. He arrived in Ürümqi on 10 June. The appointment of Huang as a pacification commissioner further strained the relations between Shang and the Chinese government.

Sheng expected that the Chinese government would recognise him as duban, and that Huang's visit would affect that decision. Huang was ignorant of the frontier problems and his arrogant behaviour offended some of the provincial leaders. The rumours spread that Huang was already named a new governor or that Chiang decided to split Xinjiang into several smaller provinces. However, the true Huang's task was to secure the cooperation between the coup leaders and establish a new provincial mechanism with a pro-Nanjing stance. Sheng exploited the rumours and charged that Huang, an agent of Wang Jingwei had plotted with Liu, Zhang and Ma to overthrow the provincial government. On 26 June Huang was placed under house arrest, and the three coup leaders were also arrested and immediately executed. After the Chinese government apologised and promised Sheng the recognition of his position, Huang was allowed to return to Nanjing three weeks after the arrest.

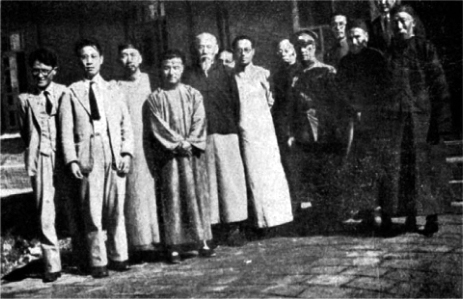
Luo Wengan (seventh from left) with the newly reformed Xinjiang provincial government

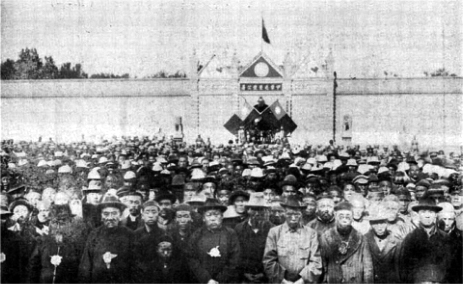
The welcome ceremony held in Yining by Zhang Peiyuan for Luo Wengan in September 1933

Shortly afterwards, in August Chiang sent Foreign Minister Luo Wengan, as a sign of goodwill, to preside over Sheng's inauguration ceremony as a Commissioner of the Xinjiang Border Defence. However, at the same time, the Chinese government used Luo's visit to contact two of Sheng's rivals, Ma in Turpan and Zhang in Yining. They were encouraged to launch an attack against Sheng. As soon as Luo left the province, a war broke out between Sheng on one side, and Ma and Zhang on the other. Sheng accused Luo not only for plotting but also of an assassination attempt. Luo's left Xinjiang in early October, and his departure marked the beginning of the era of deep alienation between Sheng and the Chinese government.

In September 1933, Sheng accused Civil Governor Liu Wenlong of plotting with Ma and Zhang through Luo with Nanjing in order to overthrow him. He was forced to resign and was replaced by Zhu Ruichi, a more controllable official. Sheng created a new bureaucratic hierarchy, nepotistically appointing new officials and replacing one of his predecessors.

Confronted by Ma's army outside of Ürümqi, Sheng sent a delegation to Soviet Central Asia to request assistance. Sheng later claimed that the delegation was sent under the aegis of Jin's request for military equipment. However, Sheng made a more comprehensive deal with the Soviets. His delegation returned in December 1933, together with Garegin Apresov, who would later be appointed as the Soviet General Consul in Ürümqi. The Soviets provided substantive military assistance to Sheng, who in return gave the Soviets wide political, economic and military control over Xinjiang.

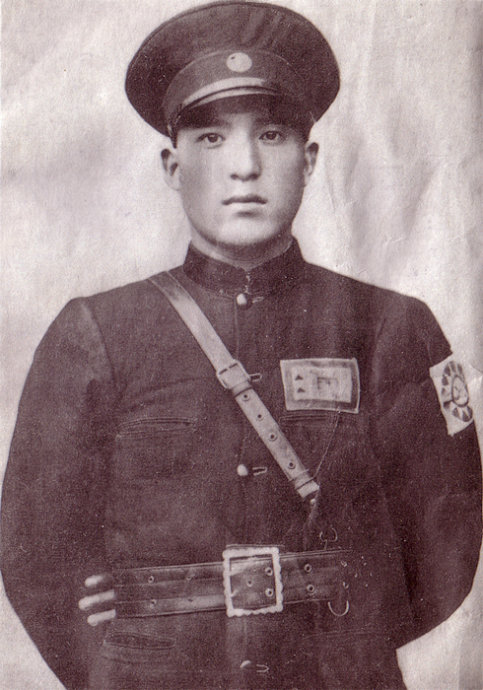
Sheng's rival Ma Zhongying

Ma sieged Ürümqi for the second time in January 1934. This time, the Soviets assisted Sheng with air support and two brigades of the Joint State Political Directorate. With their aid, Sheng again defeated Ma's forces, who retreated south from Tien Shan, in a region controlled by the East Turkestan Republic (ETR). The same month, Ma's forces arrived in Kashgar, extinguishing the ETR. Hoja-Niyaz, president of the ETR escaped upon the arrival of Ma's troops to the Xinjiang-Soviet border, and in town Irkeshtam signed an agreement that abolished the East Turkestan Republic and supported Sheng's regime. In early 1934, Zhu Ruichi died and was replaced by Li Rong as Civil Governor.

In January, the Chinese government approved Huang Shaohong's plan for military operation in Xinjiang, in order to put the province under its effective control. Huang had in mind to act pragmatically, offering support either to Sheng or Ma, whoever was willing to cooperate with the Chinese government. The pretext for the operation was the development of Xinjiang and adjacent provinces. For that purpose, the Xinjiang Construction Planning Office was established in Xinjiang with Huang in charge. With enthusiasm from the Minister of Finance H. H. Kung, Huang purchased foreign-manufactured armored vehicles. By April, the preparations reached their final stage. However, the whole plan came to a halt in May because the Soviets have already entered Xinjiang and assisted Sheng against Ma.

Under pressure from Sheng's strengthened military forces, Ma's troops retreated from Kashgar in June–July 1934 to the southeast towards Hotan and Yarkand, where they remained until 1937. Ma himself retreated via Irkeshtam to Soviet Central Asia, accompanied by several officers and a Soviet official. Sheng sent requests to the Soviets to turn him in, but they refused. By this move, the Soviets intended to achieve dual benefits. First, by removing Ma from Xinjiang's political arena, they wanted to increase Sheng's rule, which would give them higher control over the province; and second, they intended to use Ma as leverage against Sheng in case he did not comply with their interests in the province. The armistice between the Hui forces and the Xinjiang government was agreed upon in September 1934. Zhang, after suffering defeat, committed suicide.

Following the withdrawal of the Hui forces to Hotan in July 1934, Ma Hushan consolidated his power over the remote oases of the Tarim Basin, thus establishing a Hui satrapy, where Hui Muslims ruled as colonial masters over their Turkic Muslim subjects. The region was named Tunganistan by Walther Heissig. Tunganistan was bordering on two, eventually, three sides with Xinjiang province, and on the fourth side bordered the Tibetan Plateau. Despite the fact that negotiations were underway with the command of the 36th Division, the Dungan command did not make concessions on any issues. Moreover, the Soviets, intending to keep the 36th Division as a fallback against Sheng, vacillated regarding the complete annihilation of the 36th Division, giving refuge to the Dungan commanders and establishing trade relations with the 36th Division.

== Rule ==
=== Consolidation ===
On the anniversary of the 12 April coup in 1934, the Xinjiang provincial government published an administrative plan called the "Great Eight-Point Manifesto" or "Eight Great Proclamations". These included: the establishment of racial equality, guarantee of religious freedom, equitable distribution of agricultural and rural relief, reform of government finance, the cleaning up of government administration, the expansion of education, the promotion of self-government and the improvement of the judiciary. The program was practicable since each point represented a grievance that one nationality had against the previous government, which enabled Sheng to enact the reforms. The first two points which dealt with "the realisation of equality for all nationalities" and "the protection of the rights of believers" advanced the national and religious rights of the Xinjiang nationalities.

Sheng sent a letter to Joseph Stalin, Vyacheslav Molotov and Kliment Voroshilov in June 1934. In the letter, Sheng expressed his belief in the victory of Communism and referred to himself as "convinced supporter of Communism". He called for the "fastest possible implementation of Communism in Xinjiang". Sheng also not only denounced the Nationalist government, but expressed his aim in overthrowing it, suggesting support for the Chinese Soviet Republic and joint offensive against the Chinese government. Sheng also expressed his wish to join the Communist Party of Soviet Union. In a letter sent to the Soviet General Consul Garegin Apresov in Ürümqi, Stalin commented that the Sheng's letter made a "depressing impression on our comrades". The content of Sheng's letter led Stalin to refer him as "a provocateur or a hopeless "leftist" having no idea about Marxism". In a reply to Sheng, Stalin, Molotov and Voroshilov refused all of his proposals. Garegin Apresov, who was later recalled to Moscow and repressed, had enormous power in the province in 1933–1937.

In August 1934, Sheng affirmed that the nine duties of his government are to eradicate corruption, to develop economy and culture, to maintain peace by avoiding war, to mobilise all manpower for the cultivation of land, to improve communication facilities, to keep Xinjiang permanently a Chinese province, to fight against imperialism and Fascism and to sustain a close relationship with Soviet Russia, to reconstruct a "New Xinjiang", and to protect the positions and privileges of religious leaders.

Flag of Xinjiang, based on the flag of the Soviet Union, adopted in 1934

The dependency of the Sheng regime on the Soviet Union was further highlighted with the publication of the "Six Great Policies" in December 1934. The Policies guaranteed his previously enacted "Great Eight-Point Manifesto" and included "anti-imperialism, friendship with the Soviet Union, racial and national equality, clean government, peace and reconstruction". Sheng referred to them as "a skillful, vital application of Marxism, Leninism, and Stalinism in the conditions of the feudal society of economically and culturally backward Xinjiang". They served as the ideological basis of Sheng's rule. With the proclamation of the Six Great Policies, Sheng adopted a new flag with a six-pointed star to represent these policies.

On 1 August 1935, Sheng founded the People's Anti-Imperialist Association in Ürümqi. Garegin Apresov submitted a presentation to the Politburo of the Communist Party of the Soviet Union which accepted the creation of the association on 5 August. The association had to be composed of representatives of the Soviet special services bodies. As the leader of the association, Sheng became one of the main figures of Soviet regional policy. The creation of the association strengthened the Soviet position in Xinjiang.

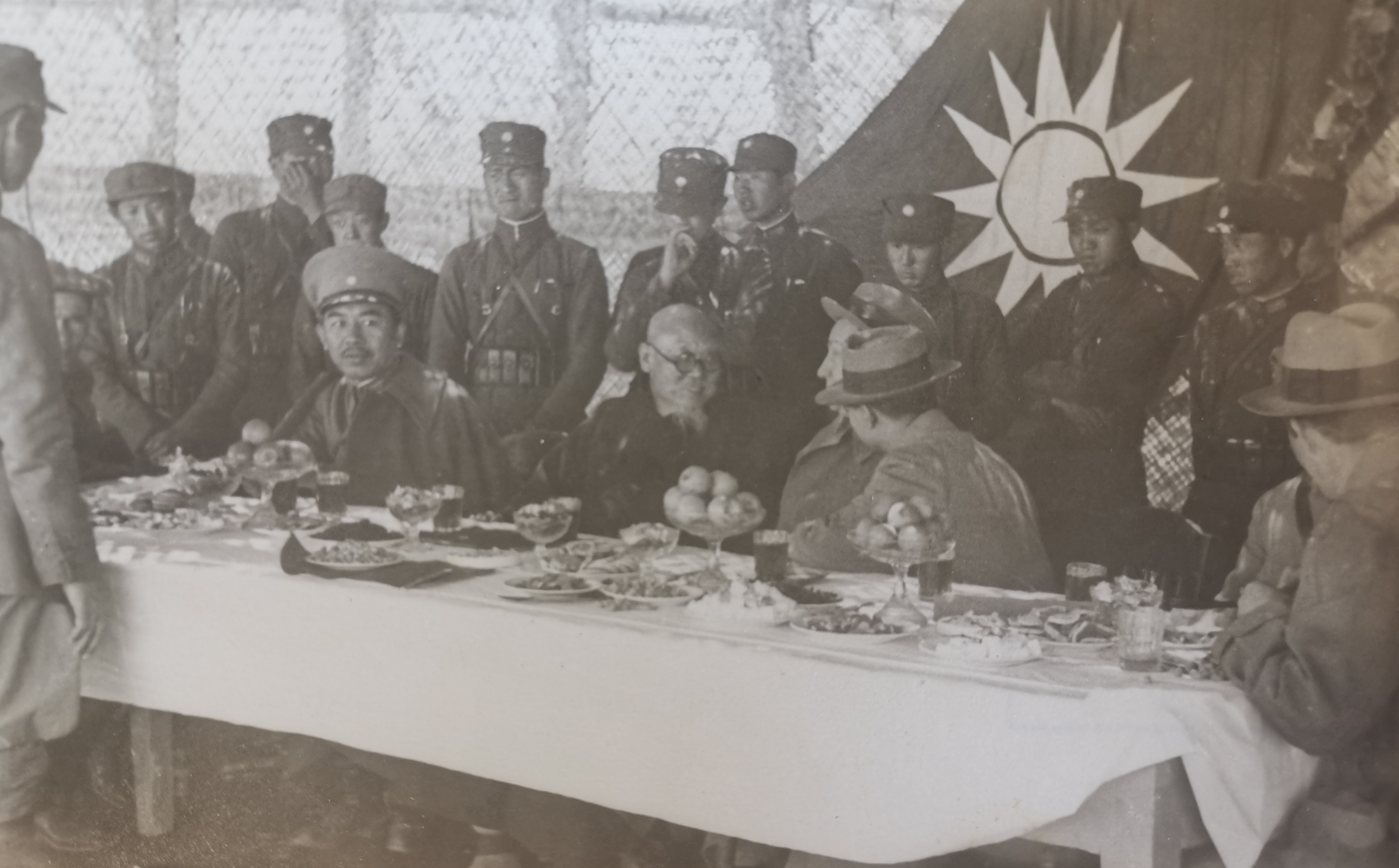
Shen Shicai and the USSR Consul General in Ürümqi G. A. Apresov at an official reception in Xinjiang.

The propaganda of the association was the Anti-Imperialist War Front. Xinjiang's Youth and Xinjiang's Women served as the association's youth and women's wing respectively. In 1935, the association had 2,489 members, and in 1939, the Association's membership rose to 10,000. The membership was nationally diverse, and included Han, Hui and various Turkic peoples.

In 1935 the British consul in Kashgar sent a report to the Foreign Office which stated that the influence of the Soviet Union on Xinjiang and its population increased. In order to check the reliability of these claims, the Chinese government sent a special commission to Ürümqi. However, the commission concluded that Soviet assistance is friendly and commensurate with the assistance previously provided to the province by the Soviet Union. Only after this, the governments of Xinjiang, China, and the Soviet Union issued a joint statement in which the allegedly impending annexation of Xinjiang to the USSR was characterised as untrue. Sheng and the "reliable people" he appointed in the province played a special role in the fact that the Chinese authorities came to this conclusion. After this joint statement, the Soviet Union felt even more comfortable in Xinjiang politics. In 1935 the Politburo made several secret decisions to strengthen Soviet influence in the region.

When in December 1936 Zhang Xueliang arrested Chiang Kai-shek in the Xi'an Incident. Sheng sided with Zhang, who asked for his help, and intended to proclaim that his rebels were under Xinjiang's protection. Only after the Soviets condemned the incident and characterised it as a Japanese provocation, and demanded from Sheng to drop his support for Zhang, did Sheng refuse to support Zhang.

=== Kashgar region and Islamic Rebellion ===
Two weeks after Ma Zhongying left for the Soviet territory, in early July 1934, Kashgar was occupied by a unit of 400 Chinese soldiers under the command of Kung Cheng-han on 20 July. He was accompanied by the 2,000 strong Uighurs commanded by Mahmut Muhiti, a wealthy ex-merchant. Thus, Kashgar was peacefully taken over by Xinjiang's provincial authority after almost a year.

To reassure the local population and to give himself additional time to consolidate his power in the northern and eastern parts of the province, Sheng appointed Muhiti as the overall Military Commander for the Kashgar region. Sheng was not comfortable with the Muslim officials in Kashgar, therefore a month later, he appointed his fellow Manchurian Liu Pin to the position of Commanding Officer in Kashgar. Muhiti was demoted and retained the position of Divisional Commander.

Sheng's Han Chinese appointees took effective control over the Kashgar region, and foremost amongst them was Liu, a Chinese nationalist, and a Christian. Liu understood little about the local Muslim culture. Immediately upon his arrival, he ordered that the picture of Sun Yat-sen, the founder of the Chinese Republic, be hung in the Kashgar mosque. The local Muslim population was dismayed by the developments in Kashgar and considered that the "Bolsheviks had taken over the country and were bent on destroying religion". Also Sheng's educational reform which attacked basic Islamic principles, as well as atheistic propaganda, contributed to the alienation of the Xinjiang's Muslim population.

Also in 1936, in the Altay region in northern Xinjiang, local Muslim nationalists, led by Younis Haji, founded the Society of National Defence. This society included influential Muslim figures. Sheng received information on the preparation of a powerful protest movement by this society. However, he did not have the capacity to suppress this movement with his own forces.

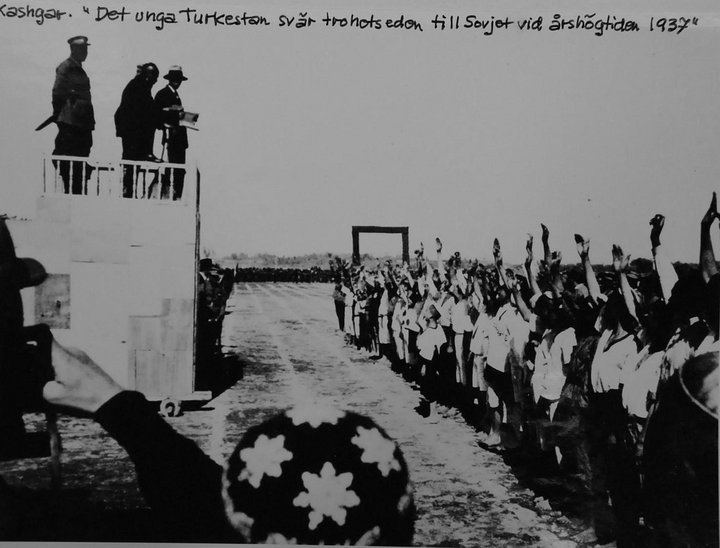
Soviet invasion in Kashgar

In Afghanistan, Muhammad Amin Bughra, the exiled leader of the East Turkestan Republic, approached the Japanese ambassador in 1935 proposing the establishment of the ETR under Japanese patronage and proposed Mahmut Muhiti as the leader of the newly established puppet state. The plan was later aborted when Mahmud in fear for his life fled from Kashgar to British India in April 1937.

Muhiti became the focal point of the opposition to Sheng's government. From the middle of 1936, he and his supporters began to propagate the idea of creating an "independent Uyghur state". In this case, he was supported by Muslim religious leaders and influential people from Xinjiang. Muhiti, having entered into contact with the Soviet consul in Kashgar Smirnov, even tried to get weapons from the Soviet Union, but his appeal was rejected. Then, by contacting former Dungan opponents, in early April 1937, Muhiti was able to raise an uprising against the Xinjiang authorities. However, only two regiments of the 6th Uyghur Division, stationed north and south of Kashgar in Artush and Yengihissar, came out in his defence, while the other two regiments, 33rd and 34th, stationed in Kashgar itself, declared their loyalty to the Sheng's government.

Urged by the Soviets, Sheng's government sent a peacekeeping mission to Kashgar to resolve the conflict. The negotiations, however, did not take place. The Soviets tried to contact Ma Hushan, the new commander of the Dungan 36th Division, via Ma Zhongying, to disarm Muhiti's rebels. However, Muhiti, with 17 of his associated fled to British India on 2 April 1937.

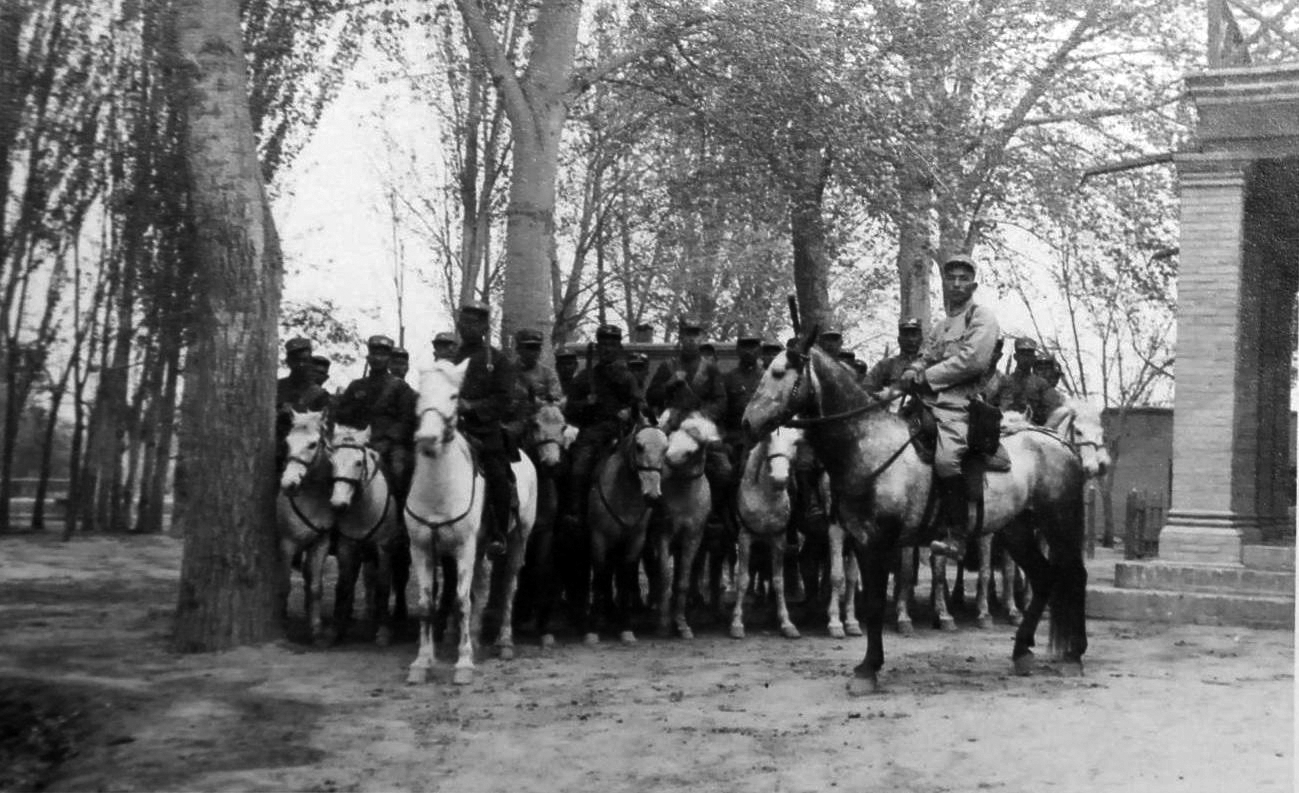
Abdul Niyaz with his soldiers in Kashgar during the rebellion

After Muhiti's flight to British India, Muhiti's troops revolted. The revolt was Islamic in its nature. Muhiti's officer Abdul Niyaz succeeded him and was proclaimed a general. Niyaz took Yarkand and moved towards Kashgar, eventually capturing it. Those with pro-Soviet inclinations were executed and thus new Muslim administration was established. Simultaneously, the uprising spread amongst the Kirghiz near Kucha and among Muslims in Hami. After capturing Kashgar, Niyaz's forces started to move towards Karashar, receiving assistance from the local population along the way.

In order to jointly fight against the Soviets and Chinese, Niyaz and Ma Hushan signed a secret agreement on 15 May. Ma Hushan used the opportunity and moved from Khotan to take over Kashgar from the rebels in June, as promulgated by the agreement. However, 5,000 Soviet troops, including airborne and armoured vehicles were marching towards southern Xinjiang on Sheng's invitation along with Sheng's forces and Dungan troops.

The Turkic rebels were defeated and Kashgar retook. After the defeat of the Turkic rebels, the Soviets also stopped maintaining the 36th Division. Ma Hushan's administration collapsed. By October 1937, along with the collapse of the Turkic rebellion and the Tungan satrapy, Muslim control over the southern part of the province ended. Soon afterwards, Yulbars Khan troops in Hami were also defeated. Thus, Sheng became the ruler of the whole province for the first time.

=== 1937–38 purges ===
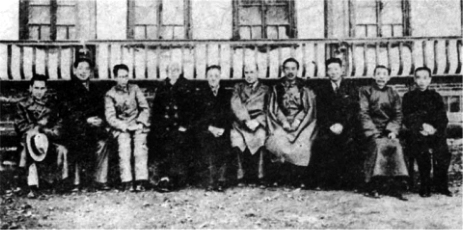
Sheng Shicai (fourth from right) with Garegin Apresov (fifth from right) and Chinese Minister of Education Chen Lifu (fifth from left) in Ürümqi, October 1937

During the Islamic rebellion, Sheng launched his own purge in Xinjiang to coincide with Stalin's Great Purge. Sheng started the elimination of "traitors", "pan-Turkists", "enemies of the people", "nationalists" and "imperialist spies". His purges swept the entire Uyghur and Hui political elite. The NKVD provided the support during the purges. In the later stages of the purge, Sheng turned against the "Trotskyites", mostly a group of Han Chinese sent to him by Moscow. In the group were Soviet General Consul Garegin Apresov, General Ma Hushan, Ma Shaowu, Mahmud Sijan, the official leader of the Xinjiang province Huang Han-chang, and Hoja-Niyaz. Xinjiang came under virtual Soviet control. It is estimated that between 50,000 and 100,000 people perished during the purge.

In 1937, Sheng initiated a three-year plan for reconstruction, for which he received a Soviet loan of 15 million rubles. At Joseph Stalin's request, Sheng joined the Communist Party of the Soviet Union (CPSU) in August 1938 and received Party Card No.1859118 directly from Molotov during his secret visit to Moscow. However, Sheng did not set up the provincial branch of the CPSU in Xinjiang.

Having eliminated many of his opponents, Sheng's administration had a staff shortage. For this reason, he turned to the Chinese Communist Party (CCP) in Yan'an for help. In the circumstances of the Second United Front against the Japanese, the CCP sent dozens of its cadres to Xinjiang. The CCP members were mostly employed in high-level administrative, financial, educational and cultural ministerial posts in Ürümqi, Kashgar, Khotan and elsewhere, helping to implement Sheng's policies. They also maintained the only open communication line between Ya'an and the Soviet Union. Among those sent by the CCP was Mao Zemin, a younger brother of Mao Zedong, who served as Deputy Finance Minister.

=== Nationality policy ===
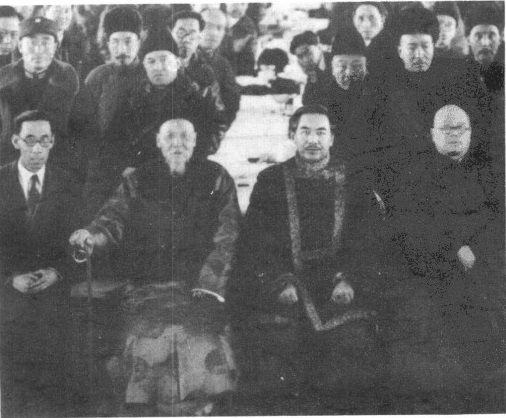
Sheng Shicai (first row, third from left) at the founding of the Association for Promotion of the Han Chinese Culture

During Sheng's rule, the Han Chinese represented only a small minority in Xinjiang. F. Gilbert Chan claimed that they made up only 6% of the population at the time, while Sheng himself during his visit in Moscow in 1938, told Kliment Voroshilov that the Han made around 10% (roughly 400,000 people) of the population of Xinjiang. In his relationship with Xinjiang's non-Han populace, Sheng adopted the Soviet nationality policy. The non-Han nationalities were for the first time included in the provincial government. The first principle of his Declaration of Ten Guiding Principles stated that "all nationalities enjoy equal rights in politics, economy, and education". He also reorganized Xinjiang Daily, the only regional newspaper at the time, to be issued in Mandarin, Uyghur and Kazakh language. The educational programme encouraged the Han to learn Uyghur and the Uyghurs to learn Mandarin. Sheng's nationality policy also entailed the establishment of the Turkic languages schools, the revival of madrassas (Islamic schools), the publication of the Turkic languages newspapers and the formation of the Uyghur Progress Union.

Sheng initiated the idea of 14 separate nationalities in Xinjiang, and these were Han Chinese, Uyghurs, Mongols, Kazakhs, Muslims or Dungan, Sibe, Solon, Manchu, Kyrgyz, White Russian, Taranchi, Tajiks, and Uzbeks. To foster this idea, he encouraged the establishment of cultural societies for each nationality. The description of Xinjiang as a home of 14 nationalities, both in Xinjiang, as well as in proper China, brought Sheng popularity. However, Sheng's policy was criticized by the Pan-Turkic Jadidists and East Turkestan Independence activists Muhammad Amin Bughra and Masud Sabri, who rejected the Sheng's imposition of the name "Uyghur people" upon the Turkic people of Xinjiang. They wanted instead the name "Turkic nationality" (Tujue zu in Chinese) to be applied to their people. Sabri also viewed the Hui people as Muslim Han Chinese and separate from his own people. Bughra accused Sheng of trying to sow disunion among the Turkic peoples. However, Sheng argued that such separation was necessary in order to guarantee the success of the future union.

Another agenda from the Soviet Union Sheng implemented in Xinjiang was secularization with the purpose of undermining religious influence. Moreover, many Uyghurs and non-Han people were sent for education abroad, most notably in Tashkent, Uzbek SSR to the Central Asian University or Central Asian Military Academy. With their return, these students would find employment as teachers or within the Xinjiang administration.

Sheng's nationality policy served as a basis for the later Communist regime's nationality policy in Xinjiang, with few exceptions.

=== Relations with the Soviet Union ===
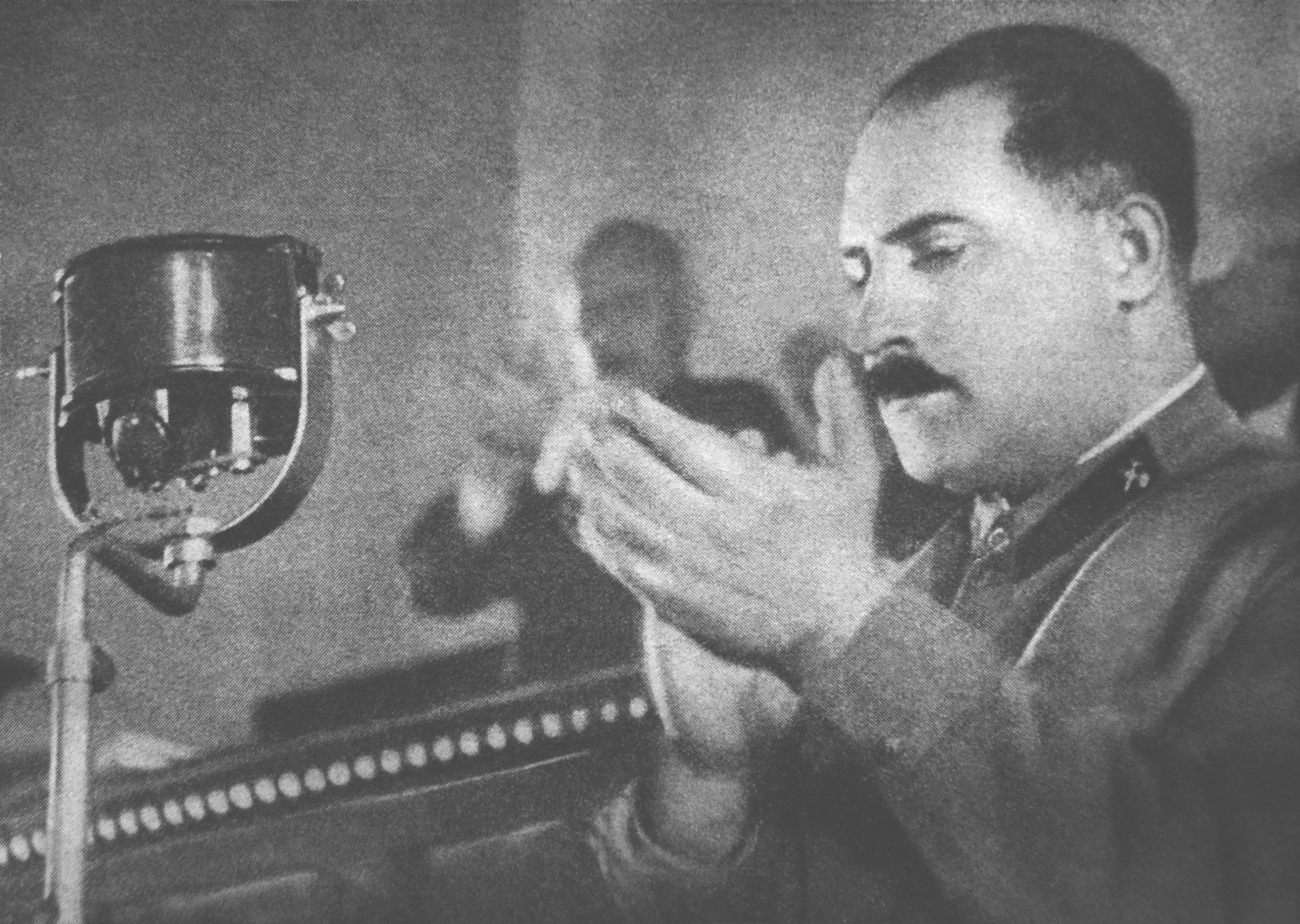
Lazar Kaganovich

In March 1935, Lazar Kaganovich, who headed a newly established commission for developing areas of cooperation with Xinjiang, submitted a proposal to Politburo. Based on these proposals Politburo adopted a number of resolutions. Xinjiang received loans at low-interest rates, various economic assistance, and the sending of numerous consultants and specialists, which strengthened the position of Sheng's regime.

Kaganovich proposed a trade turnover with Xinjiang in 1935 of 9750 thousand rubles, of which 5000 thousand rubles were to come to the share of import, and 4,750 thousand rubles from export operations. Since Kaganovich's proposal was deemed unrealistic, Politburo once again discussed the issue and adopted the resolution "On Trade with Xinjiang" in June. According to the resolution, imports from Xinjiang were reduced, while exports remained the same. The imports from Xinjiang included cotton, wool, leather, livestock, and other raw materials.

The second section of the proposal deals with financial issues. To improve the financial sector of the Xinjiang economy and strengthen the provincial currency, it was proposed to balance the budget as a priority task. To this end, it was envisaged to reduce costs in administrative and managerial and military areas, centralise expenses and tax operations, replace all taxes with general provincial taxes, ban the issuance of counterfeit money, reconstruct a provincial bank, etc.

The proposal's third section were concerned with agriculture and the fourth with transport issues. In that matter, the construction of the main road connecting Xinjiang and the Soviet Union, the increase of cargo transportation along the Ili and Kara Irtysh Rivers and a number of other measures were planned here. These works were later expanded. In October 1937, begun the construction of the Sary-Tash–Sary-Ozek–Ürümqi–Lanzhou road with a length of 2,925 km, of which 230 km passed through the territory of the Soviet Union, 1,530 km through Xinjiang, and 1,165 km through the province of Gansu. Several thousands of Soviet citizens worked on the construction of the road.

The fifth section of the proposals prepared by the Kaganovich Commission regulated the issues of commodity credit. According to this section, machines and equipment supplied by the Soviets for the industrial enterprises being built and reconstructed in Xinjiang were to be registered as commodity loans.

The document related to the exploration work in Xinjiang stated that "geological exploration of minerals and, first of all, tin, in Xinjiang, was done at the expense of the USSR" and that the People's Commissar of Heavy Industry (NKTP) was to send a geological expedition. The search for tin, tungsten, and molybdenum was very important for the Soviets, so they established a special expedition for this task.

The sixth section of the proposal dealt with personnel issues. The section suggests that the departments sending advisers and instructors to Xinjiang pay special attention to the qualitative selection of workers sent to Xinjiang. According to the Kaganovich Commission, the number of advisers and instructors sent to Xinjiang, including military consultants and instructors, should not exceed 50 people.

During these recent years our Xinjiang has received both moral and material friendly aid from your country, for which we are extraordinarily grateful. Such a grant of a loan of five million gold rubles at low interest without any conditions is the first case in the history of the foreign loans of China. The devoted and sharp work of the military instructors, advisers, engineers, doctors, and other workers you have assigned to us has not occurred in the previous history of foreign specialists invited by China. We believe that all this aid from you to us is based on your policy of peace, that such aid is being given to us for the sake of our peace, so that we can pursue peaceful construction, so the peoples of all nationalities can pursue a peaceful life, and so we can establish everlasting friendly and peaceful relations with you.

— Sheng's letter to Vyacheslav Molotov, 4 October 1936

On 11 September 1935, Politburo adopted five resolutions regarding Xinjiang. In the second resolution, it decided to amend the Kaganovich proposal for the establishment of the joint-stock company and to replace it with a special Soviet trading office. Additionally, Politburo discussed the issue of "Xinjiang Oil" and adopted a resolution. The resolution called for the preparation of the development of oil near the Soviet border under the firm of the Xinjiang government. Exploration was carried out in accordance with this decision and in 1938 oil fields were discovered in Shikho. The same year, the joint Xinjiang-Soviet company "Xinjiangneft" was established. Also, General Consul Apresov was given extended powers. Soviet officials in Xinjiang needed his permission to take any action and he could dismiss any Soviet worker "who did not know how to behave in a foreign country". Two days later he was awarded the Order of Lenin "for successful work in Xinjiang".

Along with decisions concerning the economy, Politburo also adopted a resolution on the possibility for Xinjiang young people to receive education in the USSR. At first, there was a quota for 15 students, which was expanded to 100 in June 1936. In the 1930s, 30,000 Xinjiang people, preferably Chinese, received education in the various specialties in the Soviet Union.

The resolutions also concerned the reconstruction of the Xinjiang army. The Soviet Union sent equipment and instructors for this end. Xinjiang received aircraft, equipment for aviation, rifle-machine-guns and artillery workshops, uniforms, personal supplies, and other military equipment. Soviets also opened pilot schools to train local airmen. The Soviets also proposed the reduction of army to 10,000 men, but Sheng refused this proposal and instead reduced it to 20,000 men.

In an agreement from 16 May 1935, ratified without consent from the Chinese government, the Soviet government provided substantial financial and material aid, including a five-year loan of five million "gold rubles" (Sheng actually received silver bullion). At about the same time, again without consent from the Chinese government, Soviet geologists started a survey of Xinjiang's mineral resources. The result was Soviet oil drilling at Dushanzi. During Sheng's rule, Xinjiang's trade came under Soviet control. The Soviet General Consul in Ürümqi was effectively in control of governing, with Sheng required to consult them for any decision he made. Alexander Barmine, the Soviet official responsible for supplying arms to Sheng, wrote that Xinjiang was "a Soviet colony in all but name".

The Soviet stranglehold around Xinjiang was further enhanced through a secret agreement signed on 1 January 1936. The agreement included a Soviet guarantee to come to the aid of Xinjiang "politically, economically and by armed force... in case of some external attack upon the province". By mid-1936, a significant number of Soviet specialists were active in Xinjiang involved in construction, education, health, and military training. The Russian language replaced English as the foreign language taught in schools. A number of Muslim youths, including Muslim girls, were sent to Soviet Central Asia for education. Sheng's government implemented atheistic propaganda, and Muslim women were encouraged to appear in public without a veil.

== Approachment to the Chinese government ==
Between 1934 and 1942, there were no significant relations between the Sheng's government and the Nationalist government. As the full-scale War of Resistance/WWII broke out between China and the Empire of Japan, the Chinese government entered the Sino-Soviet Non-Aggression Pact in a joint war effort against imperial Japan. However, with the German invasion of the Soviet Union, Sheng saw an opportunity to strike down Soviet proxies, the CCP and to mend his relationship with the Chinese government now seated in Chongqing.

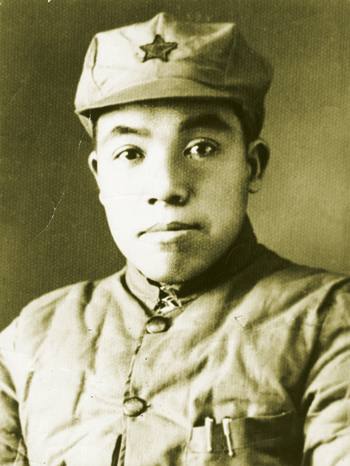
Mao Zemin, Mao Zedong's brother, executed by Sheng Shicai in 1943

Sheng had long prepared to purge the CCP in Xinjiang. In 1939, his agents filled reports on clandestine meetings, the constant exchange of letters, and the unauthorized content of some of their propaganda. A month after the German invasion, in July 1941, the CCP cadre had been demoted or cashiered. Chen Tanqiu, the chief liaison of the CCP reported in Yan'an that his relations with Sheng became "extremely cold".

In the same month, the first sign of a thaw in the relationship between Xinjiang and the Chinese government occurred, a month after the German invasion, when Sheng allowed the Chinese diplomat in Moscow to visit Xinjiang for an official tour.

On 19 March 1942, Sheng's brother Sheng Shiqi was mysteriously murdered. According to one version, the Soviets, fearing that Sheng Shicai might switch sides, tried to overthrow him. The coup started with Sheng Shiqi's murder committed by his wife, convinced to do so by the Soviet agents. The other version is that he was murdered by Sheng Shicai because of his close ties to Moscow. After his brother's death, Sheng continued his crackdown on the CCP. On 1 July 1942 he ordered their relocation in the Ürümqi outskirts for "protection".

On 3 July 1942, a major delegation of the Chinese government's officials arrived at Ürümqi upon Sheng's invitation. Chiang Kai-Shek designated Zhu Shaoliang as a leader of the mission. The mission was initiated by Sheng's younger brother Sheng Shiji a few months earlier. The reaction of the Soviet Foreign Minister Vyacheslav Molotov followed soon after, as he presented Chiang the Sheng's ideas about the implementation of Communism in Xinjiang, his support for Chiang's arrest in Xi'an Incident and the offer to make Xinjiang a Soviet republic. However, the Chinese government disregarded Molotov's presentation. On 9 July, Chiang informed the Soviet ambassador that the Soviet authorities "must now deal with the central government of China" and are not permitted to "discuss anything with Sheng duban [i. e. military governor]". Chiang designated Zhu Shaoliang as a contact person for the Soviets.

The later publication of Sheng's correspondence with the Soviet authorities, allowed the Chinese government to set up a special office in Ürümqi, from where they handled Xinjiang's foreign affairs, and to set up the Kuomintang roots throughout the province, replacing the People's Anti-Imperialist Association, which he disbanded in April 1942. Sheng was appointed the head of the provincial Kuomintang. Both dubanship and civil governorship remained in Sheng's hands. The National Revolutionary Army troops were not allowed to enter Xinjiang.

As Wu Shaoliang shuttled between Ürümqi and Chongqing, Sheng requested a permanent liaison to be appointed to handle his foreign affairs. The Chinese government appointed Wu Zexiang Minister of Foreign Affairs of Xinjiang. Ministerial position for a domestic post was unusual but approved by Chiang due to "special conditions and circumstances" in Xinjiang. Minister Wu's post was of consultative nature, and the Chinese government acted as an arbiter in the case of a dispute between him and the provincial authorities. Sheng demanded that Wu assumes more responsibility in dealings with the Soviets.

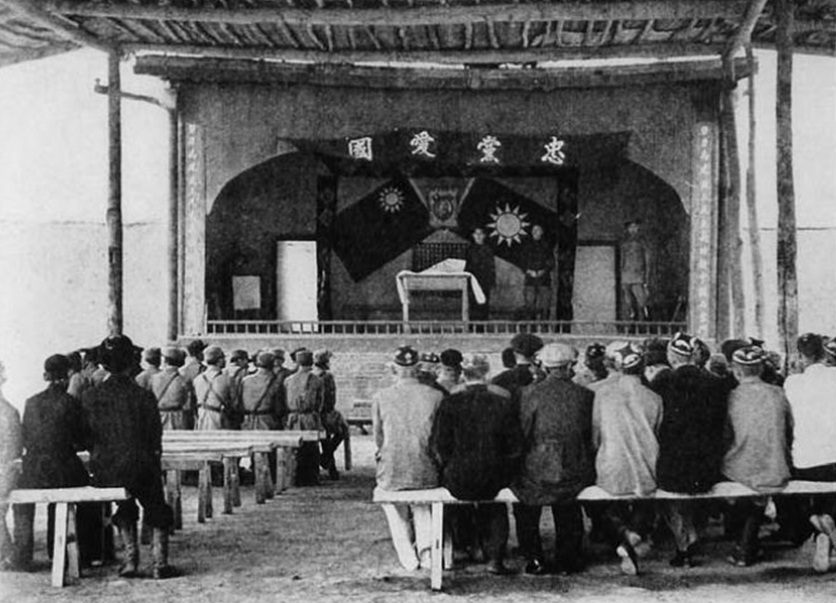
Kuomintang in Xinjiang in 1942

The final months of 1942 saw the most turbulent period in Xinjiang-Soviet relations. In October 1942 Sheng demanded from the Soviet General Consul that all Soviet technical and military personnel be withdrawn from Xinjiang within three months. To the Soviets, who were engaged in the Battle of Stalingrad and desperate to retain the oil reserves at Dushanzi, which oil quality was comparable with product of Baku oil fields, this demand represented numerous logistical difficulties. On 3 November 1942 Sheng issued a directive prohibiting "organizations, groups, and private persons" to engage in "any trade activity involving foreign imports and exports." The aim of the directive was to end the Soviet trade monopoly in Xinjiang. The Soviets withdrew their military and civilian personnel in March 1943. Despite Sheng's ultimatum, only in March–April 1943 did the Soviets notify Sheng and the Chinese government of their withdrawal.

With the Soviet gradual withdrawal, the Kuomintang representatives and personnel filled the void. In June 1943, four divisions of the NRA New 2nd Army commanded by Zhu Shaoliang were transferred to Xinjiang from Gansu. In October 1943, the Kuomintang effectively removed Soviet influence from Xinjiang. With the Soviets gone, in September Sheng ordered the arrest and execution of the CCP cadres. Among them was Mao Zemin, Mao Zedong's younger brother, who was among eighty-eight conspirators involved in the Soviet plot to overthrow Sheng.

== Later tenures and retirement ==
To be able to return such a large territory back to the central government without firing a single shot is the greatest accomplishment a border official can accrue to his name.

— Chiang's statement in defence of Sheng at the Sixth Party Congress, May 1945

As the Germans lost the Battle for Stalingrad and Battle of Kursk, Sheng tried to return to the pro-Soviet policy. He ordered the arrest of the Kuomintang personnel, telling Stalin that they were Japanese spies, and telling Chiang that they were communists. Stalin, however, refused to intervene and left Sheng at the mercy of the Chinese government, which engineered his removal from office. Zhu Shaoliang convinced him to resign and accept the post of Minister of Agriculture. Sheng officially resigned from his post and was appointed as Minister of Agriculture and Forestry on 29 August 1944. He left Xinjiang on 11 September 1944 to join the Chinese government in Chongqing. The post of Minister of Agriculture under Kuomintang was reserved for men out of power since the post was insignificant with the increasing power of the landlords. Chiang signed an order allowing Sheng to recoup the wealth beneath the governor's building. The storehouse contained fifty thousand taels of gold, chests full of valuable antelope horns, and endless blocks of opium. In total, Sheng removed 135 truckloads of wealth.

Sheng's stay in Chongqing was troublesome. In April 1945, his former Finance Minister Peng Jiyuan was beaten in Ürümqi, and sought refuge with Sheng after his recovery. Wu Zhongxin, his successor in Xinjiang, wrote that Sheng "started to lose his mind in Chongqing" and that in accordance with the tenets of Buddhism and as recompense for his past crimes, "he has descended to the lowest depths of hell". At the Sixth Party Congress held in May 1945, Uyghur leader Masud Sabri called for Sheng's head; however, Chiang defended Sheng. Sheng held the ministerial post until 30 July 1945, and later worked as an adviser to Hu Zongnan in Xi'an.

In 1949, Sheng accompanied the Kuomintang in Taiwan where he lived in comfortable retirement with his wife and four children. Sheng was interviewed by Allen S. Whiting and wrote his own accounts under the title Red failure in Sinkiang in Sinkiang: pawn or pivot?, published in 1958.
