= Allen S. Whiting =

American political scientist (1926–2018)

Allen Suess Whiting (October 27, 1926 – January 11, 2018) was an American political scientist and former government official specializing in the foreign relations of China.

Whiting was University of Arizona Regents' Professor of Political Science from 1993 to his retirement, having joined the university in 1982. He graduated from Cornell University in 1948, earned a master's degree from Columbia University in 1950 and a Ph.D. from Columbia University in 1952. After first joining the Department of Political Science at Michigan State University, he became a researcher at the RAND Corporation and served in several capacities in the U.S. Department of State, including head of the Far Eastern Division of the Bureau of Intelligence and Research and deputy consul general in Hong Kong. He then taught at University of Michigan, Ann Arbor, 1968–1982. Whiting has been a member of the Board of Directors of the National Committee on United States-China Relations, the Association for Asian Studies, and the International Institute of Strategic Studies.

== Early life and education ==
Allen Suess Whiting was born to Leo Robert and Viola Allen (née Suess) Whiting in Perth Amboy, New Jersey. He graduated from Cornell University in 1948, where he studied with Knight Biggerstaff, and received a master's degree from Columbia University in 1950. In 1952, he received a Ph.D. from Columbia University.

== Career and major works ==
Whiting was instructor of political science at Northwestern University from 1951 to 1953, but his contract was not renewed when senior colleagues felt that his interest in the Soviet Union and China were politically suspicious. He was unemployed for a time, but received a Ford Foundation grant to study language in Taiwan. While there he contracted polio, whose effects afflicted him for the rest of his life. Between 1955 and 1957 he was assistant professor at Michigan State University in East Lansing. From 1957 to 1961 he was a social scientist at the RAND Corporation in Santa Monica, California. Between 1962 and 1966 he worked for the United States Department of State as Director of the Office of Research and Analysis for the Far East. From 1966 to 1968 he served as Deputy Consul General in Hong Kong. Whiting continued his academic career as professor of political science at University Michigan in Ann Arbor, where he worked from 1968 to 1982. He was then a professor at the University of Arizona in Tucson between 1982 and 1993, and from then a regents professor. He was a director of the Center for East Asian Studies from 1982 to 1993. Whiting also served as a consultant for the Department of State between 1968 and 1988 and as director of the National Committee on the United States-China Relation in New York City from 1977 to 1994. He was an associate of the China Council from 1978 to 1988. From 1983 to 1995 he was president of the Southern Arizona China Council in Tucson and a fellow of the Woodrow Wilson Center in Washington from 1995 to 1996.

=== Sinkiang: Pawn or Pivot? (1958) ===
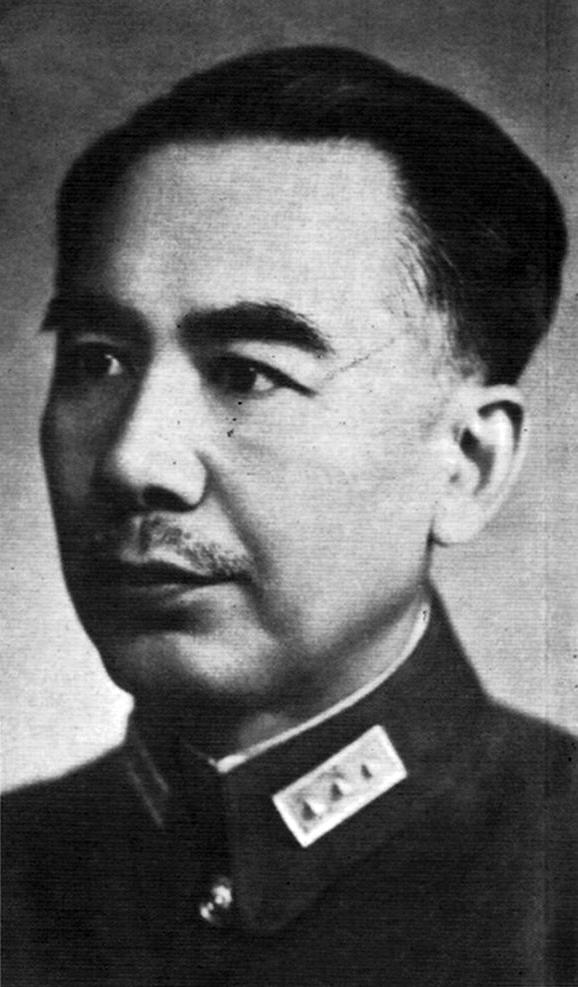
Governor of Xinjiang Sheng Shicai

His 1958 Sinkiang: Pawn or Pivot? includes Whiting's "Soviet Strategy in Sinkiang: 1933-49" (pp. 3–148), which analyzes the background and the international rivalry between Moscow and the Chinese central government in this period, and "Red Failure in Sinkiang," the memoirs of Sheng Shicai, the military ruler of Xinjiang (Sinkiang, as it was spelled at the time), from 1933 to 1949. The book also includes archival material, for instance, Sheng's interrogation and 1943 execution of Mao Zemin, the brother of Mao Zedong.

While studying in Taiwan in 1954, having heard that Sheng had come there with the Nationalist government after the communist victory on the mainland, Whiting inquired as to Sheng's whereabouts and was told that they were "unknown." Whiting then met and interviewed Sheng extensively and edited his memoirs for this book. Whiting also interviewed Nationalist government officials who had dealt with Sheng, Stalin, and Xinjiang, as well as exploring archives in Taiwan and the Ministry of Foreign Affairs in Tokyo. He received helpful accounts of wartime diplomacy from O. Edmund Clubb, who opened the first American consulate in Urumchi in 1943. Although he thanks Owen Lattimore in the Foreword for adding "another dimension of understanding," Whiting explains that by titling the book "pawn or pivot," he wished to place a different emphasis from Lattimore's 1950 book Pivot of Asia and from those who saw the region as simply a pawn of the neighboring great powers. Taking the advice of a friend, he observed that in chess a "pawn" could also be a "pivot."

Since Xinjiang was an important communication link between Moscow and the Chinese Communist Party headquarters in Yan'an, Sheng's memoirs illuminate the sometimes angry relations between Stalin and Mao Zedong as well as Sheng's swing away from Moscow to ally with China.

=== China Crosses the Yalu (1960) ===
China Crosses the Yalu: the Decision to Enter the Korean War is a monograph based on research for the United States Air Force by the RAND Corporation. Whiting argues that China entered the Korean War reluctantly and to protect its border against a perceived American threat. This view became widely accepted at a time when many other observers saw the People's Republic as irrational and expansionist. William Stueck's 2002 review of scholarship on the Korean War concluded that in its "broad outlines, Whiting's account remains plausible if hardly incontestable."

In 1990 two political scientists at Taiwan's National Chengchi University revisited the question of China's decision. They noted that "Whiting's comprehensive study of China's decision to enter the war, and some of his inferences and conclusions, were closer to the truth than those of most other western analysts"; considering the limited materials he had then from the Chinese side, "probably no one could have done better than he did." But they also saw evidence that Whiting was "deeply biased ideologically, and overlooked many important factors." He assumed that "patron-client relations existed between Stalin and Mao, which "limited the possibilities he could explore," rather than seeing that China's primary concern was for security in the face of a hostile power on their border.

=== Department of State in the 1960s ===
Whiting was recruited from his position in the RAND Corporation in late 1961 and became head of the Far Eastern Division of the Bureau of Intelligence and Research.

In 1962, as the Cuban Missile Crisis was breaking out, Whiting and his group correctly predicted that border clashes between India and China would escalate into the Sino-Indian War of 1962, and that China would initiate and then inflict a humiliating military defeat on America's ally, India. When President Kennedy then sent Averell Harriman to India to keep relations calm, Whiting and his group, including a specialist in Tibetan affairs, were dispatched with them. In the words of a National Security Archive history, Whiting's group "embarrassed the U.S. military, and helped Harriman's mission, because their excellent maps ... were much better than anything the military had and formed the basis for policy discussions."

Whiting had responsibility for gathering and analyzing intelligence on the People's Republic of China at a time when there were no diplomatic relations and direct access was not possible but calculating China's intentions was important in making military decisions in the Vietnam War. In his memoirs, Secretary of Defense Robert McNamara complained that he was hampered in decision-making because there were no diplomats who were as familiar with China as those who were familiar with Russia. Reviewers took exception to this claim. Roger Hilsman, who had been assistant Secretary of State in the Kennedy administration, pointed to Whiting as just such a Chinese-speaking expert. The problem, he said, was not that the department did not have such experts but that McNamara would not listen to them.

Hilsman's successor, Thomas L. Hughes, wrote in his own review of McNamara's book that Whiting regularly briefed McNamara and Secretary of State Dean Rusk. Whiting, said Hughes, warned Pentagon officials in August 1964 that North Vietnam would retaliate against American air bases after the bombings of Hanoi. Whiting recommended that aircraft be moved to Thailand or provided with extra security. Neither action was taken and the planes suffered heavy damage when the bases were attacked. Hughes also describes Whiting as "a major influence on both Dean Rusk and George Ball in the 1960s as well as on Henry Kissinger and his opening to China in the 1970s."

Whiting's State Department group was often at odds with the CIA and military, whose assessments of the intentions of China and the North Vietnamese often contended that the application of force, such as escalated bombing, would induce Hanoi to make concessions or come to the bargaining table. Whiting's group considered those views unrealistic and predicted that the Chinese would be willing to take military action if pushed. Whiting later conceded that in the end, the fear of Chinese intervention may have gone too far, although Chinese intervention may have been prevented by the split in the leadership and China's turn inward at the outbreak of the Cultural Revolution in 1965. His State Department intelligence group then correctly predicted that China would limit itself to low-risk support of North Vietnam, such as allowing the use of air bases in southwest China. Whiting found on a trip to Vietnam, however, that high-level U.S. Navy intelligence estimates of Chinese capabilities did not include the existence of these airbases, which Whiting knew to exist. He was warned that some disgruntled fighter pilots identified him as a source of resistance to the air war and that he might be in danger of bodily harm.

As the American involvement in Vietnam became deeper and more contentious, Whiting became a frequent adviser to George W. Ball, then deputy undersecretary of state, whom President Lyndon Johnson consulted as a counterweight to more hawkish advisers, and also to Averell Harriman. But in 1966, when McGeorge Bundy, Whiting's direct contact in the White House, was replaced by the more hawkish Walt Rostow, Whiting accepted the position of deputy consul in the US consulate in Hong Kong.

In 1968, he became professor of political science at the University of Michigan, where he taught until 1982. However, Whiting remained heavily involved in State Department affairs, even traveling to the summer home of Richard Nixon in San Clemente to personally brief him about the threat of the Sino-Soviet border conflict becoming a war.

In the early 1970s, Whiting was pulled back into public affairs with the publishing of the Pentagon Papers. Asked to testify about the matter as an expert witness during the subsequent trial, Whiting testified that the disclosure of the Pentagon Papers had not damaged the national defense, stating, "I cannot see any way in which these [the Pentagon Papers] would be of any advantage to a foreign national operating against the United States" Under examination by Charles Nesson, Whiting contested the assertions by Paul F. Gorman that the Pentagon Papers had hurt the United States' national defense by alerting the Soviet Union to the fact that their phones had been tapped at a summit in London in February 1967. Instead, Whiting testified that the Soviets had known the phones were tapped and intentionally discussed matters they wanted the British and American governments to intercept. Whiting concluded by stating, "I see no way in which the material could be used to injure the United States." His characterization was later strongly disputed in court by Alexander Haig, a top military advisor for President Nixon.

=== The Chinese Calculus of Deterrence (1975) ===
The Chinese Calculus of Deterrence: India and Indochina compared two situations in which China's decision-makers moved to deter foreign powers. The first was the situation leading up to the `1962 Sino-Indian War and the second was that in Vietnam in the mid-1960s.

Andrew Scobell calls it a "classic work" based on a "meticulous mining of the limited sources available to the author in the early 1970s." It "holds up remarkably well today." The body of the work focuses, Scobell says, on a "systematic reconstruction of the Chinese decisions which... led to war with India" in 1962 and then "carefully compares this case study with Chinese decision making to intervene in the Korean War in 1950 and the Vietnam War in the mid-1960s." Whiting portrays China as a "cautious and conservative power that uses force as a last resort only after repeated signaling has failed to deter its adversary." After its publication in 1975, many internal Chinese documents, memoirs, and histories were published in the PRC. the author is more sanguine about Chinese thinking on military force.

John W. Garver writing in 2005 noted that Whiting and the British journalist Neville Maxwell reached the same broad conclusion: "China's resort to war in 1962 was largely a function of perceived Indian aggression." New China sources, Garver continued, made possible a "testing" of this "Whiting-Maxwell thesis." While finding that the thesis was largely sound, Garver added that Mao's judgments about Indian motives were shaped by fundamental attribution error, which finds that it is common to explain the motivation of others in terms of their character or culture while explaining one's own motivation by external necessity, and psychological projection, that is, ascribing one's own suppressed aggression to others.

In 2001, Whiting took advantage of new publications and archives to write an article reconsidering The Chinese Calculus of Deterrence. He adjusted his earlier assessment of Chinese caution and observed that in addition to being deliberative and calculating, Chinese leaders exhibited an alarming propensity for risk-taking.

=== China Eyes Japan (1989) ===
China Eyes Japan, published by University of California Press in 1989, uses both the official Chinese press and anonymous interviews with policy-making elites in China to focus on the tensions between the two countries which grew in the 1980s.

Donald Klein, reviewing the book in Journal of Asian Studies says that Whiting "describes these events in masterful fashion" and "never pushes his evidence to prove some preconceived notion." Whiting granted anonymity to his subjects in order to understand how much the Chinese were publicly displaying indignation as a bargaining tactic and how much this sense of historic wrong affected policy. What emerges from Whiting's analysis, Klein continues, is the "indelible point" of the "depth and fervor of China's historic memory of Japan's past predatory policies" and the "special intensity" concerning the Nanjing Massacre of 1937. Although some Chinese officials admired Japan's economic success, Whiting's off-the-record interviews made clear that the feelings of enmity were serious and sincere. Whiting concluded that "the conventional cliche about a 'love-hate relationship' does not apply," for "there is no 'love' on the Chinese side...."

=== General assessment ===
The volume New Directions In The Study Of China’s Foreign Policy, edited by Alastair Iain Johnston and Robert S. Ross, grew out of a December 2002 conference held in Whiting's honor at Harvard University. Chapters in the volume revisit Whiting's books in order to reconsider the arguments in light of new evidence. The editors note in their concluding remarks that Whiting has "long argued that China’s government pursues its international goals with basic rationality," even those "ideologically fundamentalist actors, like Mao himself." They add that "rationality" is conditioned by "perceptions and misconceptions" held both by China's foreign policy elites and the elites of other countries. This understanding includes an emphasis on the role of historical legacies and the links between domestic political legitimacy. Whiting, they say, has taught a lesson: "to try to see China and the world the way that influential Chinese see China and the world and you will be not only a much better scholar but a more effective advisor to those creating policy toward Beijing in the United States and elsewhere. Empathy, not sympathy, is critical."

== Selected works ==
- Whiting, Allen S. (1954). Soviet Policies in China, 1917-1924. New York: Columbia University Press. HathiTrust (search only).
- —— (1956). Dynamics of International Relations. with Ernst Haas. New York: McGraw-Hill.
- —— (1958). Sinkiang: Pawn or Pivot?. with Shicai Sheng. East Lansing: Michigan State University Press. Full-view HathiTrust
- —— (1960). China Crosses the Yalu: the Decision to Enter the Korean War. New York: Macmillan. ISBN 9780804706278.
- —— (1975). The Chinese Calculus of Deterrence: India and Indochina. Ann Arbor: University of Michigan Press. ISBN 978-0472969005.
- —— (1976). China and the United States, What Next?. New York: Foreign Policy Association.
- —— (1977). China's Future: Foreign Policy and Economic Development in the Post-Mao Era. with Dernberger, Robert F. New York: McGraw Hill. ISBN 978-0070699588.
- —— (1979). Chinese Domestic Politics and Foreign Policy in 1970s. Ann Arbor: Center for Chinese Studies, University of Michigan. ISBN 978-0892640362.
- —— (1981). Siberian Development and East Asia: Threat or Promise?. Stanford, Calif.: Stanford University Press. ISBN 978-0804711098.
- —— (1989). China Eyes Japan. Berkeley: University of California Press. ISBN 978-0520065116.
- —— (2001). "China's Use of Force, 1950–96, and Taiwan". International Security. 26 (2): 103–131. doi:10.1162/016228801753191150. S2CID 57570622.

== Sources ==
- Garver, John W. (2006), "China's Decision for War with India in 1962", in Johnston, Alastair I.; Robert S. Ross (eds.), New Directions in the Study of China's Foreign Policy, Stanford, CA: Stanford University Press, ISBN 978-0804753623
- Johnston, Alastair I., and Robert S. Ross (2006). New Directions in the Study of China's Foreign Policy. Stanford, CA: Stanford University Press. ISBN 978-0804753623.
- Pollack, Jonathan; Shambaugh, David (2019), "In Memoriam: Allen Seuss Whiting, 1926-2018", China Quarterly (236): 917–919
- Scobell, Andrew (2005), "Review Essay "Is There A Chinese Way of War"?" (PDF), Parameters: 118–122, archived from the original (PDF) on 2015-01-21
