= Battle of Ürümqi (1933) =

1933 battle of the Kumul Rebellion

First Battle of Ürümqi
- Part of the Kumul Rebellion
Date	1933
Location	Ürümqi, Xinjiang
Result	Provincial victory

Belligerents
(Taiwan) Republic of China New 36th Division	(Taiwan) Chinese Xinjiang Provincial government

Commanders and leaders
(Taiwan) Ma Shih-ming	(Taiwan) Jin Shuren (Taiwan) Sheng Shicai; Colonel Pappengut

Strength
10,000 Chinese Muslim troops	North East Salvation Army (Manchurian soldiers) and 1,800 White Russian troops

Casualties and losses
- ~6,000 troops killed (estimated by Wu Aichen)

The First Battle of Ürümqi (Chinese: 第一次迪化之戰) was a conflict in the spring of 1933 between the armies of the Xinjiang provincial government under Jin Shuren and the New 36th Division (National Revolutionary Army) of the Nationalist government of China. The Chinese government secretly urged Hui General Ma Zhongying to attack Jin Shuren while at the same time assuring Jin that he was recognized as the legitimate Governor. Fierce fighting broke out at the gates of the city, and one of the Chinese commanders torched a street where the Muslims troops had managed to break through at the West Gate, killing everyone in the vicinity, including refugees. The Dungans were then forced to retreat into the range of machine gun fire, which killed many of them.

A White Russian force of 1,800 troops under Colonel Pavel Pappengut subsequently fought off the Muslim soldiers. Wu Aichen was told at least 2,000 had died by that point. The Muslims attempted to scale the walls at the Great West Bridge, and several were killed. The city was relieved when the provincial forces of newly incumbent Military Governor of Xinjiang (新疆督办) Sheng Shicai approached and the Muslim troops fled. Approximately 6,000 Chinese/Han and Muslim soldiers died in the fighting.
