= Ishaq Beg Munonov =

Kyrgyz leader in Xinjiang (1902–1949)

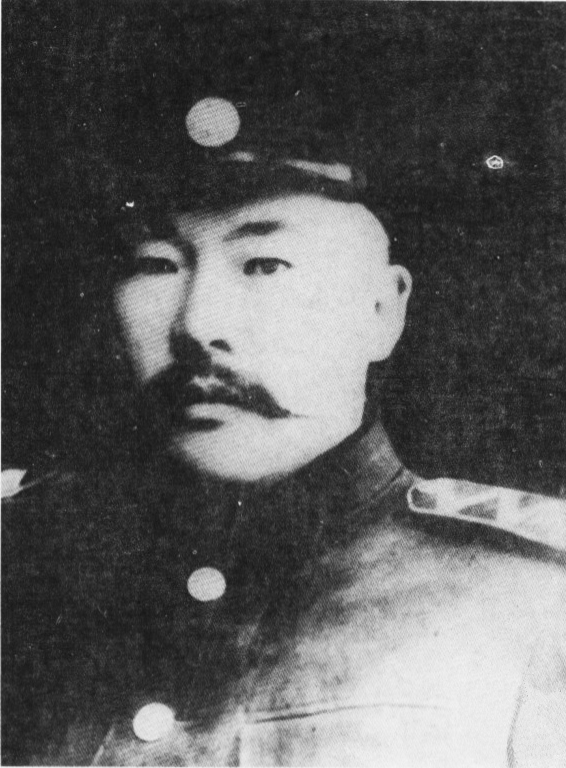
- Born: 1902; Jigin, Ulugqat County, Xinjiang Province, Qing Empire (now Kizilsu Kyrgyz Autonomous Prefecture, Xinjiang, People's Republic of China)
- Died: 27 August 1949 (aged 46–47) Kabansk, Kabansky District, Buryat-Mongolian ASSR, Russian SFSR, USSR (now Buryatia, Russia)
- Allegiance: Republic of China (1925–1944); Second East Turkestan Republic (1944–1946)
- Rank: Lieutenant General (ROC)
- Conflicts: Basmachi Movement; Kumul Rebellion; Chinese Civil War; Ili Rebellion

Chinese name
- Simplified Chinese: 伊斯哈克拜克·穆努诺夫
- Traditional Chinese: 伊斯哈克拜克·穆努諾夫
Transcriptions
Standard Mandarin
- Hanyu Pinyin: Yīsīhākèbàikè Mùnǔnuòfū

Alternative Chinese name
- Simplified Chinese: 伊斯哈克拜克·木农阿吉
- Traditional Chinese: 伊斯哈克拜克·木農阿吉
Transcriptions
Standard Mandarin
- Hanyu Pinyin: Yīsīhākèbàikè Mùnóngājí

Uyghur name
- Uyghur: ئىسھاق بەگ مۇنونوپ
Transcriptions
- Latin Yëziqi: Ishaq Beg Munonop
- Siril Yëziqi: Исһақ Бег Муноноп

Kyrgyz name
- Kyrgyz: إسحاق بك موني; Ысакбек Монуев; Isakbek Monuev

Ishaq Beg Munonov (Note: Kyrgyz: إسحاق بك موني, romanized: Isakbek Monuev; Uyghur: ئىسھاق بەگ مۇنونوپ, romanized: Ishaq Beg Munonop; Chinese: 伊斯哈克拜克·穆努诺夫; pinyin: Yīsīhākèbàikè Mùnǔnuòfū) (1902 – 27 August 1949) was an ethnic Kyrgyz leader in Xinjiang, China, during the first half of the 20th century.

== Early life ==
Ishaq Beg Munonov was a native of Ulugqat in western Xinjiang. Shortly after the Russian Revolution of 1917, he moved to the Soviet Union to study and became a follower of Marxism. After returning to China in 1922, he was imprisoned for espousing revolutionary beliefs and urging the Kyrgyz to rise up against Xinjiang governor Jin Shuren. He later served as a regiment and then a brigade commander in the army of Sheng Shicai who supplanted Jin Shuren as governor in 1933. Some sources say that Ishaq Beg was a spy sent by Soviet intelligence to Xinjiang to support Sheng Shicai.

Ishaq Beg was a capable commander but aroused the suspicion of Sheng Shicai, who removed his military post and reassigned him to Yining to serve as the head of the Kazakh-Kyrgyz Cultural Society. In Yining, Ishaq Beg was under government surveillance.

== Ili Rebellion ==
In 1943, he secretly returned to southern Xinjiang and organized a militia called the Puli Liberation Organization in Tashkurgan where he led a rebellion in June 1944. After the outbreak of the Soviet-backed Ili Rebellion in November 1944, he became a deputy commander-in-chief of the Ili National Army. The uprising gave rise to the Second East Turkestan Republic (ETR). Ishaq Beg was a member of the pro-Soviet progressive faction within the ETR. He reportedly held both Chinese and Soviet citizenship. In the summer of 1945, he directed the Battle of Jinghe-Wusu.

In June 1946, the revolutionaries of the ETR, which controlled three of Xinjiang's 10 districts, and the Nationalist Chinese government, which held the other seven districts, reached a peace agreement and formed a coalition government in Xinjiang. Soviet advisors departed the Ili National Army and Ishaq Beg became the commander-in-chief.

In August 1949, as the Chinese Communist Party (CCP) gained the upper hand of the Chinese Civil War, the CCP and the Ili leadership began discussing cooperation. The CCP's delegate to Ili, Deng Liqun, stayed at the home of Ishaq Beg in Yining. He conveyed Mao Zedong's invitation of the Ili leaders to attend a planning conference for the founding of the People's Republic of China.

Ishaq Beg Munonov was part of the leadership delegation that left Yining on 22 August 1949 for Beiping. He, along with Ehmetjan Qasim, Abdukerim Abbasov, Dalelkhan Sugirbayev and Luo Zhi, was killed in a plane crash near Lake Baikal on or about 26 August 1949.

== Legacy ==
In the People's Republic of China, Ishaq Beg is remembered as a martyr and hero in the struggle against the Nationalist regime. His remains were returned to China in April 1950 and later reburied in a martyrs' memorial cemetery in Yining. The cemetery has a stele with calligraphy by Mao Zedong, praising Ishaq Beg and his fellow martyrs for their contributions to the Chinese people's revolution and mourning their death en route to the Inaugural Chinese People's Political Consultative Conference in Beijing.

== Works referenced ==
- Forbes, Andrew D. W. (1986). Warlords and Muslims in Chinese Central Asia: A Political History of Republican Sinkiang 1911–1949. CUP Archive. ISBN 0521255147. Archived from the original on 5 March 2025.
