= Han Youwen =

Chinese military commander

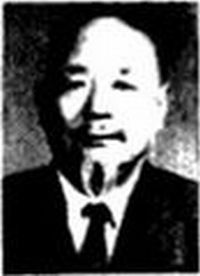
- Major General Han Youwen

Vice Chairman of Xinjiang Province
- In office January 1981 – January 1998

Personal details
- Born: October 1912 Hualong Hui Autonomous County, Qinghai
- Died: February 22, 1998 (aged 86) Ürümqi, Xinjiang, China
- Party: Kuomintang, then Revolutionary Committee of the Kuomintang
- Children: Han Zhihua (韓芝華)

Military service
- Allegiance: Republic of China; People's Republic of China
- Years of service: 1931–1949
- Rank: Major General
- Unit: First Cavalry Division of the National Revolutionary Army
- Commands: Chief of the Kuomintang Qinghai province Police Bureau, commander of KMT First Cavalry Division
- Battles/wars: Long March, Second Sino-Japanese War, Chinese Civil War, Ili Rebellion, Pei-ta-shan Incident

Han Youwen (simplified Chinese: 韩有文; traditional Chinese: 韓有文; pinyin: Hán Yǒuwén; Wade–Giles: Han Yu-wen; October 1912 – February 22, 1998) was an ethnic Salar Muslim General in the National Revolutionary Army of the Republic of China, born in Hualong Hui Autonomous County, Qinghai. His Muslim name was Muhammad Habibullah (穆罕默德·海比不拉海).

== Career ==
His father's name was Aema 阿额玛. Aema was a Salar Muslim who served in the Gansu Army under Dong Fuxiang in the Boxer Rebellion against the invading Eight-Nation Alliance. His mother was a Tibetan woman named Ziliha (孜力哈).

The book, "Who's who in China current leaders" shows that Han Youwen had been the chief of the "Kuomintang Qinghai province Police Bureau", in addition to his military service as commanding the "Kuomintang First Cavalry Division".

In 1931, he joined the army under General Ma Bufang.

During World War II, he was an officer in the 5th Cavalry Army's 1st Provisional Cavalry Division. Han survived an aerial bombardment by Japanese planes in Xining in 1941 while he was being directed via telephone from Ma Bufang, who hid in an air raid shelter in a military barracks. The bombing resulted in human flesh splattering a Blue Sky with a White Sun flag and Han being buried in rubble. Han Youwen was dragged out of the rubble while bleeding and he managed to grab a machine gun while he was limping and fired back at the Japanese warplanes and cursed the Japanese as dogs in his native Salar language.

In Xining Han Youwen was the captain of the defense squadron.

Han was transferred from Qinghai to Xinjiang to serve in the 5th Cavalry Army under General Ma Chengxiang in the Ili Rebellion to fight against Soviet backed Uyghur rebels. Han led Chinese Muslim forces in a bloody battle against Soviet Russian and Mongol forces during the Pei-ta-shan Incident, along with Hui Muslim General Ma Xizhen. As commander of the First Cavalry Division, General Han Youwen was sent to Beitashan by the Kuomintang military command to reinforce Ma Xizhen with a company of troops, approximately three months before the fighting broke out. At Pei-ta-shan, Major General Han Youwen was in command of all the Muslim cavalry defending against Soviet and Mongol forces. Han Youwen said "that he believed the border should be about 40 miles to the north of the mountains" to A. Doak Barnett, an American reporter. Han Youwen's 1st army division received at Beitashan Osman's forces after he retreated in battle. Qitai county was where Han Youwen's 1st army division of the 5th Army was headquartered in 1946, the following year, at the Beitashan incident Ma Xizhen battled the Mongols.

Han Youwen commanded the Pau-an-dui 保安隊 (pacification soldiers), composed of 340 man battalions, of which he had three. They were composed of a diverse range of troops, including Kazaks, Mongols and White Russians serving the Chinese regime. He served with Osman Batur and his Kazakh forces in battling the ETR Ili Uyghur and Soviet forces around Altai.

As listed in "Who's who in China current leaders", in 1949, during the Incorporation of Xinjiang into the People's Republic of China, he defected to the Communist People's Liberation Army, revolting against the Kuomintang in Urumqi. He continued to serve as an officer from 1949–1953 in the People's Liberation Army, "commander of the 7th Cavalry Division in the 22nd army". In 1953–1954 Han was then transferred to "3rd deputy chief of staff in Xinjiang Military Area Command".

The "China report" reported that in 1985 Han served as vice chairman of the "CPPCC committee" of Xinjiang, also as chairman of the "KMT revolution Committee's" Xinjiang branch. The report also contained a speech Han gave at a meeting.

In 1985 Han Youwen went on Hajj as part of an official delegation from China. Word spread around among Ma Bufang's family and followers from Qinghai who had moved to the Hejaz after the Communist victory that Han Youwen was still alive and they flocked to see him.

A meeting was inaugurated by Han Youwen in 1992. The electorate was put before him. His office was located in Qitai county of Changji Hui autonomous prefecture.

He served as one of the three Vice Chairman of Xinjiang under the Communist state. On January 16, 1993, in the People's Hall of Ürümqi he had been elected by the third session of the fourth CPPCC committee of Xinjiang, his election was reported by the media.

== Letter to Ma Chengxiang ==
38 years after splitting up, with Ma Chengxiang staying loyal to the Kuomintang, and Han Youwen defecting to the Communist Party and staying on mainland China, Han Youwen contacted Ma Chengxiang, reminiscing about defending Chinese territory in Xinjiang (against the Soviets and Uyghurs), the development of Xinjiang by the Communist party, and Islam. Ma Chengxiang met Han Youwen in Hong Kong.
