= Fotiy Leskin =

Russian military officer from Xinjiang (1913–1970)

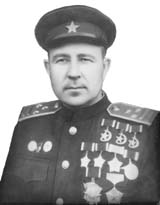
- Born: Fotiy Ivanovich Leskin; 1913; Yining, Xinjiang Province, Republic of China
- Died: 1970 (aged 56–57); Alma-Ata, Kazakh SSR, Soviet Union
- Military career
- Allegiance: East Turkestan Republic (1944–1946); People's Republic of China (1949–1953)
- Branch: East Turkestan National Army (1945–1949); People's Liberation Army (1949–1953)
- Rank: Major General of the PLA
- Commands: PLA Fifth Army (1949–1953)
- Conflicts: Ili Rebellion (1944–1946)

Russian name
- Russian: Фотий (Фаттей) Иванович Лескин

Chinese name
- Traditional Chinese: 法鐵依·伊凡諾維奇·列斯肯
- Simplified Chinese: 法铁依·伊凡诺维奇·列斯肯
Transcriptions
Standard Mandarin
- Hanyu Pinyin: Fǎtiěyī Yīfánnuòwéiqí Lièsīkěn

Fotiy "Fattey" Ivanovich Leskin (Russian: Фотий (Фаттей) Иванович Лескин; 1913–1970) was an ethnic Russian military officer born in Xinjiang, China, who commanded units in the East Turkestan National Army of the Second East Turkestan Republic (ETR) and later the People's Liberation Army (PLA) of the People's Republic of China (PRC). Although he fought for the ETR in the Ili Rebellion, he assisted PLA forces during their 1949 incorporation of Xinjiang into the PRC and subsequently became a major general in the PLA. When his PLA unit was disbanded in 1953, Leskin immigrated to the Soviet Union. He died in Alma-Ata in 1970.

== See also ==
- Russians in China
  - Ivan Polinov
