= Dalelkhan Sugirbayev =

Kazakh leader in Xinjiang (1906–1949)

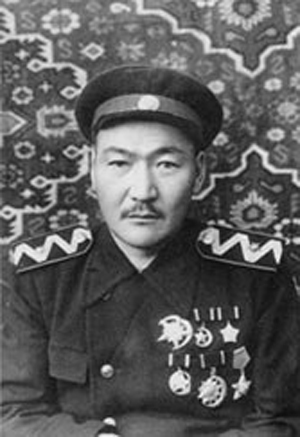
- Born: 24 June 1906; Kobdo Territory, Outer Mongolia, Qing Empire
- Died: 27 August 1949 (aged 43) Kabansk, Kabansky District, Buryat-Mongolian ASSR, Russian SFSR, Soviet Union
- Allegiance: Republic of China; Second East Turkestan Republic
- Conflicts: Ili Rebellion; Chinese Civil War

Chinese name
- Simplified Chinese: 达列力汗·苏古尔巴也夫
- Traditional Chinese: 達列力汗·蘇古爾巴也夫
Transcriptions
Standard Mandarin
- Hanyu Pinyin: Dálièlìhàn Sūgǔ'ěrbāyěfū

Uyghur name
- Uyghur: دەلىلقان سۇگۇربايۇف
Transcriptions
- Latin Yëziqi: Delilqan Sugurbayuf
- Siril Yëziqi: Делилқан Сугурбаюф

Kazakh name
- Kazakh: دالەلحان سۇگىرباەۆ; Дәлелхан Сүгірбаев; Dälelhan Sügırbaev

Dalelkhan Sugirbayev (Note: Old transliteration, from Uyghur: Talilhan Sukurbayeff; Kazakh: دالەلحان سۇگىرباەۆ, romanized: Dälelhan Sügırbaev; Uyghur: دەلىلقان سۇگۇربايۇف, romanized: Delilqan Sugurbayuf; Chinese: 达列力汗·苏古尔巴也夫; pinyin: Dálièlìhàn Sūgǔ'ěrbāyěfū) (24 June 1906 – 27 August 1949) was an ethnic Kazakh leader in Xinjiang, China, during the first half of the 20th century. He served as the Deputy Commander of the East Turkestan National Army of the Second East Turkestan Republic.

== Early life ==
Dalelkhan Sugirbayev was born in 1906 to a nomadic Kazakh family in the Bayan-Ölgii Region of Qing China (the westernmost aimag of modern-day Mongolia). His grandfather and father were both chieftains of the Qieruqi branch of the Abaq Kerey tribe. Other sources say they were part of the Naiman tribe. The family moved about the pastures in the Altai Mountains, separating Mongolia and Xinjiang.

When his father died in 1918, his older brother, Duerbuti Khan, became chief. In 1921, remnants of White Russian troops under Andrei Stephanovich Bakich entered the Tacheng region with the Soviet Red Army in pursuit. After several thousand White Russians crossed the Irtysh River, Duerbuti agreed to help the Red Army gather intelligence on the intruders. When Bakich learned that the local chieftain had refused to give livestock to his army and was helping the Soviets, he went to arrest Duerbuti. The White Russians came during Dalelkhan's wedding. They seized his brother and the family's wealth. A month later, Duerbuti was executed and Dalelkhan fled to the Red Army, who defeated the White Russians.

In the spring of 1930, Dalelkhan sent his mother and brother from Bayan-Ölgii, which had become part of independent Mongolia, to the Ashan (Altay) region of Xinjiang. Later, he followed them with a thousand tribesman.

== Leadership in Xinjiang ==
Xinjiang at the time was ruled by warlord governor Sheng Shicai. Dalelkhan was made the deputy chairman of the Society for the Advancement of Kazakh Culture. In 1937, he became a core member of the Anti-Imperialist Society of the Altay region. In September 1939, after the outbreak of World War II, Sheng Shicai began to move away from Soviet-backing. Dalelkhan opposed Sheng Shicai and moved to the Soviet Union to study. He received military training in Almaty and in October 1943, proposed organizing a national liberation army in Altay, Xinjiang. By then Sheng Shicai had severed ties with Soviet and Chinese Communists and the Soviet authorities supported Dalelkhan's plans. They sent a team of 12 military advisors to accompany him back to Ashan (Altay), via Mongolia, and they set up a militia base in Qinggil County, where they taught Kazakh nomads about the ideas of revolution and trained them into a partisan force.

Dalelkhan then joined forces with Osman Batur, an ethnic Kazakh guerrilla leader who had a larger following and backing from the Mongolian government. Osman Batur's mother was from the Qieruqi tribe, and Dalelkhan's mother asked her to have Osman take care of Dalelkhan. On account of the blood relations, Osman trusted Dalelkhan and gave him an important leadership position.

=== Rebellion in 1944 ===
In February 1944, Osman and Dalelkhan's Kazakh guerrilla force rebelled against Sheng Shicai's government and captured the Qinggil County seat. By April, the rebels had 1,000 fighters and spread the rebellion to Jeminay, Fuhai, Habahe and Chenghua (Altay). In October, the rebel forces established a revolutionary government in the Altay region. After the outbreak of the Ili Rebellion in the Ili valley, the Kazakhs began to cooperate with the Ili National Army, under the Russian commander A. Leskin.

In February 1945, the rebels captured Jeminay. In early August 1945, Osman and Dalelkhan attacked Chenghua, with the help of the Mongolian army, but could not capture the city. In September, they surrounded the city. Nationalist Chinese defenders fled for the Mongolian border but were refused entry, and surrendered. On 20 September, the guerrilla forces around Altay was organized into the Altay Kazakh Cavalry Battalion with Dalelkhan as commander.

=== Coalition government ===
Then, the political situation changed as the Nationalist leader Chiang Kai-shek pressed the Soviet Union to cease support for the rebellion. A ceasefire in October halted the fighting. On 17 November 1945, Dalelkhan issued orders protecting the legal and property rights of ethnic Han Chinese in the Altay region.

In the summer of 1946, the leaders of the Ili Uprising agreed to set aside their declaration of an independent East Turkestan Republic and joined in a coalition government with the Nationalists in Dihua. Dalelkhan became the minister of the health bureau in the provincial government.

Tensions remained high between the rebels in the three districts of northern Xinjiang and the Nationalist authorities which controlled the rest of the province. After the outbreak of full-scale civil war between the Nationalists and Communists in China proper, the Nationalists persuaded Osman Batur to change sides. Osman resented the Soviet influence in the revolutionary government and joined the Nationalists. Dalelkhan supported the Soviets and broke with Osman.

In November 1946, Osman Batur attacked Fuhai. From January to March 1947, he launched five raids on Chenghua. The Three Districts government expelled Osman Batur and designated Dalelkhan as the executive of the Altay District. In August 1947, Osman Batur and the Nationalists attacked the Altay District. After two months of heavy fighting, the Ili National Army under the command of Dalelkhan and Leskin repelled the invasion.

=== Cooperation with the Chinese Communists ===
In September 1948, he became the chair of the Altay chapter of the "Union to Protect Peace and Democracy in Xinjiang." The Union was formed by the progressive faction within the Ili government, in opposition to the pan-Turkic and pan-Islamists in the government. In November 1948, as the Chinese Communists turned the tide in the civil war, Dalelikhan spoke enthusiastically of having the INA joining forces with the People's Liberation Army.

In August 1949, Mao Zedong invited the Ili leadership to attend a political consultative conference in Beiping (now Beijing) to plan the establishment of a new national government. On 19 August, Dalelkhan received the invitation in Burqin and sought to fly to Yining to join the main leadership delegation, but the airplane carrying him had engine problems near Hoboksar and was forced to turn back. He then drove to Yining and met the Chinese Communist representative Deng Liqun. He departed for Beiping via the Soviet Union with Ehmetjan Qasimi, Abdukerim Abbasov, Ishaq Beg Munonov and Luo Zhi. All died when their airplane crashed in the Transbaikal region on or about 27 August 1949.

== Legacy ==
In the People's Republic of China, Dalelkhan is remembered as a martyr and hero in the struggle against the Nationalist regime. His remains were returned to China in April 1950 and later reburied in a martyrs' memorial cemetery in Altay.

== Descendants ==
Dalelkhan Sugirbayev's son married Nusipkhan Konbay's daughter, who was a colonel in the Ili National Army and later became the head of the Ili Kazakh Autonomous Prefecture. Dalelkhan's grandson, Tasken (Tasiken), was a contestant in the Chinese reality talent show The Voice of China.

- Son: Pätiqan Sügirbayev (Chinese: zh:帕提汗·苏古尔巴也夫, Kazakh: Фатхан (Пәтіхан) Дәлелханұлы Сүгірбаев) Governor of Ili Kazakh Autonomous Prefecture November 1954 – June 1955
- Son: Shynghyskhan Sügirbayev (Chinese: 陈格斯·达列力汗, Kazakh: Шыңғысхан Дәлелханұлы Сүгірбаев) (1937 – 6 May 2020)
- Son: Zuresh Dalelkhan

== Works cited ==
- Benson, Linda (1990). The Ili Rebellion: the Moslem challenge to Chinese authority in Xinjiang, 1944-1949. M.E. Sharpe. ISBN 0-87332-509-5.
- Forbes, Andrew D. W. (1986). Warlords and Muslims in Chinese Central Asia: A Political History of Republican Sinkiang 1911-1949. CUP Archive. ISBN 0521255147.
