= Ivan Polinov =

Russian military officer

Ivan Yakovlevich Polinov
- Died: c. 1960s Tashkent, Uzbek SSR, Soviet Union
- Military career
- Allegiance: Russian Empire (until 1917); White Army (1917–1920); Xinjiang clique (1933–1937); East Turkestan Republic (1944–1946)
- Branch: Imperial Russian Army (until 1917); East Turkestan National Army (1944–1946)
- Conflicts: Russian Civil War (1917–1920); Ili Rebellion (1944–1946)

Russian name
- Russian: Иван Яковлевич Полинов

Chinese name
- Simplified Chinese: 伊万·雅科夫列维奇·波利诺夫
- Traditional Chinese: 伊萬·雅科夫列維奇·波利諾夫
Transcriptions
Standard Mandarin
- Hanyu Pinyin: Yīwàn Yǎkēfūlièwéiqí Bōlìnuòfū

Ivan Yakovlevich Polinov (Russian: Иван Яковлевич Полинов) was a Russian and Soviet military officer who for most of his career was stationed in the Chinese border city of Yining, in northern Xinjiang. Originally a member of the Imperial Russian Army, Polinov fought in the Russian Civil War under General Alexander Dutov, before retreating to Xinjiang with Dutov's troops after their defeat by the Red Army.

In 1933, Polinov helped Chinese warlord Sheng Shicai overthrow the provincial government in Dihua (present-day Ürümqi). He served under Sheng until Sheng began purging foreigners in 1937. Polinov was arrested and shot, but he survived his injuries and fled to the Soviet Union.

Polinov returned to Xinjiang after the Ili Rebellion erupted in Yining in 1944. He joined the East Turkestan National Army (ETNA) of the newly declared East Turkestan Republic (ETR) and was given the rank of colonel. He became commander-in-chief of the ETNA and was promoted to major general upon the flight of his predecessor, Pyotr Romanovich Alexandrov, in March 1945. Polinov commanded troops fighting in the counties of Ghulja and Usu.

In June 1946, he returned to the Soviet Union after being ordered to do so by the Soviet authorities. He later pursued a doctorate in history and defended his dissertation titled "Xinjiang during the Chinese Revolution of 1911–1913". He died sometime in the 1960s in Tashkent, the capital of the Uzbek Soviet Socialist Republic.

== See also ==
- Russians in China
  - Fotiy Leskin – Russian military officer from Xinjiang (1913–1970)
