= Ma Xizhen =

Hui Chinese general

Ma Xizhen, 馬希珍
- Born: Gansu
- Military career
- Allegiance: Republic of China
- Conflicts: Ili Rebellion, Pei-ta-shan Incident

Ma Xizhen (馬希珍, Xiao'erjing: ﻣَﺎ ثِ جٌ) was a Chinese Hui Muslim General, born in Bahuzhuang village (八戶庄村) in Guanghe County, Gansu province. He joined the Ninghai Army in Qinghai and became part of its Fifth Cavalry Army. He then became the commander of the third cavalry regiment of the first division. Ma fought against Soviet and Mongol forces in the Pei-ta-shan Incident. Under his command served the Salar Muslim General Han Youwen who led the First Cavalry Division.

== Bibliography ==
- David D. Wang (1999a). Clouds over Tianshan: essays on social disturbance in Xinjiang in the 1940s. NIAS Press. ISBN 87-87062-62-3.
- David D. Wang (1999b). Under the Soviet shadow: the Yining Incident : ethnic conflicts and international rivalry in Xinjiang, 1944-1949. Hong Kong: The Chinese University Press. ISBN 962-201-831-9.
