= Elihan Tore =

President of the Second East Turkestan Republic

Elihan Tore Saghuni
- Alixontoʻra; ئەلىخان تۆرە
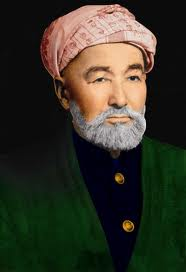

President of the East Turkestan Republic
- In office 12 November 1944 – 16 June 1946
- Preceded by: Republic established
- Succeeded by: Hakimbek Khoja (who was the Vice President) and later by Ehmetjan Qasim (as President of the Ili District Council)

Personal details
- Born: Elihan Tore; 21 March 1884 Tokmok, Russian Turkestan, Russian Empire (present-day Kyrgyzstan)
- Died: 28 February 1976 (age 91) Tashkent, Uzbek SSR, Soviet Union (present-day Uzbekistan)
- Profession: Politician, poet, scholar

Military service
- Allegiance: East Turkestan Republic
- Branch/service: East Turkestan National Army
- Rank: Marshal
- Battles/wars: Ili Rebellion (1944–1946)

Chinese name
- Chinese: 艾力汗·吐烈
Transcriptions
Standard Mandarin
- Hanyu Pinyin: Àilìhàn Tǔliè

Uyghur name
- Uyghur: ئەلىخان تۆرە ساغۇنى
Transcriptions
- Latin Yëziqi: Elixan Töre Saghuni

Uzbek name
- Uzbek: Alixontoʻra Sogʻuniy; Алихонтўра Соғуний

Elihan Tore Saghuni (Note: Saghuni is a self-adopted honourific.) (Note: Uyghur: ئەلىخان تۆرە ساغۇنى, romanized: Elixan Töre Saghuni; Uzbek: Alixontoʻra Sogʻuniy; Cyrillic: Алихонтўра Соғуний; Chinese: 艾力汗·吐烈; pinyin: Àilìhàn Tǔliè) (21 March 1884 – 28 February 1976) was an Uzbek political and religious leader who served as the president of the Second East Turkestan Republic (1944–1946). He was born in Tokmok, in present-day Kyrgyzstan, and moved to Kashgar, Xinjiang, in 1920. In April 1944, Elihan and eleven other Turkic leaders formed the East Turkestan Liberation Organization in Ghulja (Yining) to end Chinese Nationalist rule and establish an independent East Turkestan. On 11 November 1944, they launched the Ili Rebellion with the support of the Soviet Union.

== Biography ==
Elihan was elected as president of the Second East Turkestan Republic (ETR) the day after a successful rebellion in Ghulja on 12 November 1944. He held the military rank of marshal in the East Turkestan National Army, formed on 8 April 1945.

Elihan was the only person in the ETR leadership who opposed Joseph Stalin's order to terminate hostilities with the Chinese Nationalists and start negotiations in October 1945.

On 16 June 1946, six days after signing a peace agreement between the ETR and Chinese Nationalists, Elihan was forcibly returned to the Soviet Union by the KGB and confined there. He spent the rest of his life under house arrest in Tashkent, where he wrote a book about Xinjiang titled Türkistan kaygısı ("The Tragedy of Turkistan").

== Works ==
- Türkistan kaygısı, Tashkent, Uzbekistan, East Publishing House, 2003
- Tarihiy Muhammadiy, Tashkent, Uzbekistan, Publisher: Kutlukkhan Shakirov
- Drifter Saghuniy

== See also ==
- Uzbeks in China
