= Habib Yunich =

Chinese Tatar educator (1906–1945)

- Хәбиб Юнич
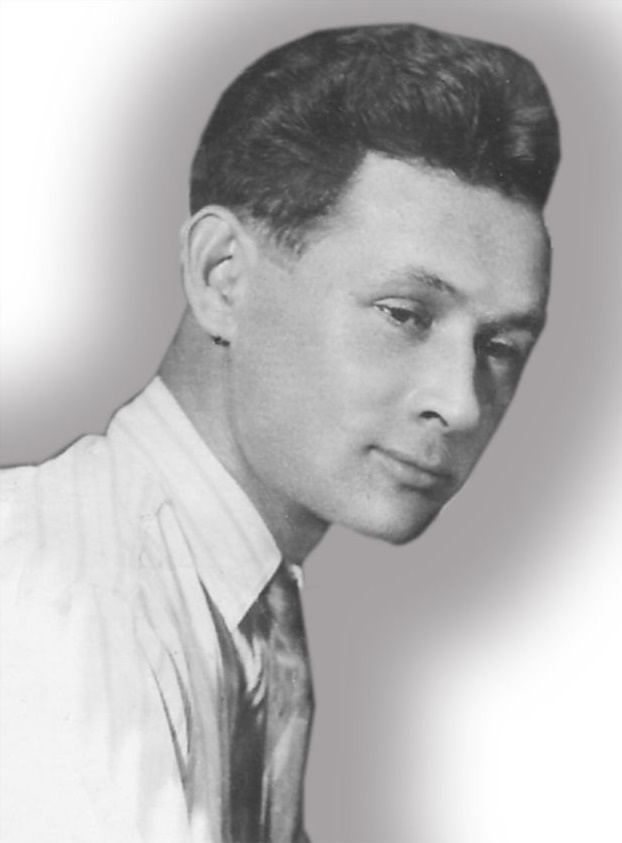
- Yunich in 1932

Education Minister of the East Turkestan Republic
- In office 18 November 1944 – January 1945
- Preceded by: Position established
- Succeeded by: Seypidin Azizi

Personal details
- Born: Habib Faziljan uli Yunich; 1906 Ghulja, Xinjiang Province, Great Qing
- Died: January 1945 (aged 38–39) Ghulja, East Turkestan Republic
- Parent: Faziljan (father)
- Occupation: Educator, journalist

Chinese name
- Chinese: 海比甫·玉尼奇
Transcriptions
Standard Mandarin
- Hanyu Pinyin: Hǎibǐfǔ Yùníqí

Alternative Chinese name
- Chinese: 海比甫·尤尼切夫
Transcriptions
Standard Mandarin
- Hanyu Pinyin: Hǎibǐfǔ Yóuníqièfū

Second alternative Chinese name
- Traditional Chinese: 哈比卜·約奇
- Simplified Chinese: 哈比卜·约奇
Transcriptions
Standard Mandarin
- Hanyu Pinyin: Hābǐbo Yuēqí

Uyghur name
- Uyghur: خەبىب فازىلجانۇلى يۈنىچ
Transcriptions
- Latin Yëziqi: Xebib Faziljanuli Yünich

Russian name
- Russian: Хабиб Юничев
- Romanization: Khabib Yunichev

Tatar name
- Tatar: Хәбиб Фазылҗан улы Юнич; Xäbib Fazılcan ulı Yüniç [xæˈbib fʌzɤɫˈʑɑn uɫɯ jyˈniɕ]

Habib Faziljan uli Yunich (Note: Tatar: Хәбиб Фазылҗан улы Юнич; sometimes Russified as Khabib Yunichev, from Russian: Хабиб Юничев.) (1906–1945) was a Chinese Tatar educator, journalist, and politician. He served as the Second East Turkestan Republic's education minister from the government's establishment in 1944 until his sudden death from typhus in 1945. He was succeeded by his deputy Seypidin Azizi.

A highly educated polyglot, Yunich was concerned primarily with improving the cultural and educational institutions of his hometown Ghulja (Yining). He founded the city's first public library and Uyghur-language newspaper.

== Early life and education ==
Habib Yunich was born in 1906, in the Uyghur-majority city of Ghulja. His father was Faziljan, a Volga Tatar from Russia who became a respected aqsaqal (local leader) of Ghulja. A tsarist, Faziljan chose not to return to Russia following the February Revolution of 1917 and successfully applied for Chinese citizenship.

Yunich studied in Turkey and the Soviet Union as a young adult, learning a plethora of Turkic languages in addition to his native Tatar. By the time he returned to Ghulja from Turkey in 1934, he had become fluent in Turkish, Uyghur, Kazakh, and Uzbek. He was also fluent in Chinese, English, and Russian.

Shortly after returning to Ghulja, Yunich organized the first Uyghur-language newspaper in the city, and more broadly in Ili District. He was the newspaper's editor from 1934 to 1944. He also established Ghulja's first public library and taught at a Tatar school in the city during the 1940s.

== Political work ==
The Second East Turkestan Republic (officially just the East Turkestan Republic or ETR) was proclaimed in Ghulja on 12 November 1944 by Soviet-backed Turkic revolutionaries, with Yunich being among them. On 18 November 1944, the ETR government appointed Yunich as Minister of Education, citing his rich cultural and linguistic education. Seypidin Azizi, a Soviet-educated Uyghur, was appointed his deputy.

Yunich was the editor of the ETR government's official newspaper, Free East Turkestan (later Revolutionary East Turkestan). It was published in four languages – Uyghur, Russian, Kazakh, and Chinese – and began circulation on 17 November 1944.

== Death ==
Yunich contracted typhus from one of his students amid an outbreak of the disease in Ghulja in the winter of 1944–45. He died in January 1945; Azizi succeeded him as the ETR's education minister on 13 March 1945.
