= Luo Zhi =

Chinese leader in Xinjiang (1915–1949)

- 罗志
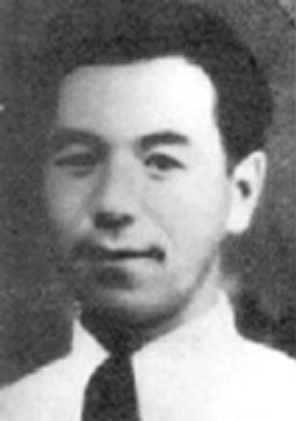
- Born: Luo Changsheng (罗长生); 1915; Foshan, Guangdong, Republic of China
- Died: 27 August 1949 (aged 33–34); Mount Kabanya, Kabansky District, Buryat-Mongolian ASSR, Russian SFSR, USSR (now Buryatia, Russia)
- Occupation: Politician
- Spouse: Du Xiuzhen

Chinese name
- Simplified Chinese: 罗志
- Traditional Chinese: 羅志
Transcriptions
Standard Mandarin
- Hanyu Pinyin: Luó Zhì
- Wade–Giles: Lo^{2} Chih^{4}

Birth name
- Simplified Chinese: 罗长生
- Traditional Chinese: 羅長生
Transcriptions
Standard Mandarin
- Hanyu Pinyin: Luó Chángshēng
- Wade–Giles: Lo^{2} Ch'ang^{2}-sheng^{1}

Uyghur name
- Uyghur: لو جى
Transcriptions
- Latin Yëziqi: Lo Ji

Russian name
- Russian: Ло Чжи
- Romanization: Lo Chzhi

Luo Zhi (Chinese: 罗志; also Lo Zu; 1915 – 1949), born Luo Changsheng (罗长生), was a Chinese revolutionary and community leader in Xinjiang. He died just before the region's incorporation into the People's Republic of China in 1949.

== Early life ==
Luo Zhi was born Luo Changsheng in Yuangang Village, Yanghe Township in what is today Gaoming District of Foshan City in Guangdong Province in 1915. In 1924, he accompanied his uncle to Manchuria to pursue studies in Changchun. After the Mukden Incident, he changed his name to Luo Zhi and joined the Northeast Anti-Japanese National Salvation Army to fight against Japanese rule. In the winter of 1932, he retreated to the Soviet Union. In 1933, he re-entered China and went to Dihua (now Urumqi). In 1935, he studied at Tashkent in the Soviet Union before continuing his studies in the politico-economy department of the Xinjiang Academy, where he was exposed to Marxist-Leninist theories. From 1939 to 1942, he taught at a teacher’s college and middle school in northern Xinjiang and was twice arrested for activism against Chinese Nationalist rule.

== Activism in Xinjiang ==
In 1945, Luo Zhi joined the Communist League of Xinjiang, which in cooperation with the Three Districts Revolution, established the Democratic Revolutionary Party in Xinjiang. Luo Zhi was elected to the central committee of the party and secretary of the Dihua chapter. In Dihua, he worked to lay the ground for the Chinese Communist takeover of the region from the Chinese Nationalists. In August 1949, he was one of five representatives invited to attend the inaugural meeting of the Chinese People’s Political Consultative Conference to be held in Beijing in September. On 27 August, the entire Xinjiang delegation led by Ehmetjan Qasimi perished in an airplane crash in the Soviet Union.

On 1 October 1949, the People’s Republic of China was founded. Nationalists authorities surrendered to the Chinese Communists and the Three Districts’ authorities also joined the Chinese Communists. Luo Zhi along with the other delegation members, Ehmetjan Qasimi, Abdukerim Abbasov, Ishaq Beg Munonov and Dalelkhan Sugirbayev, were hailed by Mao Zedong as martyrs of the Chinese Communist Revolution.
