= Ibrahim Muti'i =

Uyghur linguist and scholar

Ibrahim Muti'i (May 1920 – January 13, 2010) (Uyghur: ئىبراھىم مۇتىئى; Chinese: 伊卜拉伊木·穆提伊; pinyin: Yībólāyīmù Mùtíyī) was a well-known linguist from Xinjiang, China. He is best known for his research on Uyghur language and culture. He is considered to have been one of the top scholars of his generation in Uyghur.

== Early life ==
Muti'i was born in May 1920, in Lükchün, a small village outside Turpan in eastern Xinjiang. He was orphaned at an early age. His father, a tailor, died when he was only two years old. His mother died when he was seven. His family sent him to Urumqi to enroll in a primary school in 1928, which he did while living with his uncle. Jadid Tatars taught Ibrahim.

In 1935, at the age of fifteen, Ibrahim Muti'i received a scholarship for a two-year course of study in law at the University of Central Asia in Tashkent, in the Soviet Union. During this time, he not only learned Uzbek and Russian, but also studied Old Turkic. He had a chance to read original research material about the Uyghur people. He returned to China from Soviet Union after graduating in with a law degree in 1937 and taught Uyghur literature, language, and linguistic methodology at Xinjiang Normal University.

In 1940 he was imprisoned by the Chinese warlord Sheng Shicai, along with many other well-known, well-educated young Uyghur dissidents who Sheng Shicai thought would spread independent ideas and threaten his authority. Muti'i was released in 1945.

== Professional career ==
After release from prison, he became the first Professional Chief (Dean) for the former Xinjiang Institute (current Xinjiang University), and later served as Vice President. He married Enwere-appay, the daughter of a wealthy businessman, in 1946. She was a teacher at the Number 5 Elementary School in Urumqi.

In 1947 he was employed as a journalist by Erkin, (Chinese: 自由报; pinyin: Zìyóu Bào; lit. 'freedom') a private newspaper in Urumqi. During this time, there were insufficient new materials for understanding multilingual features either for writing new textbooks or for teaching students. To address this need, he compiled teaching materials such as Uyghur Tili Serfi (Morfologiyisi) ("Uighur Morphology"), Uyghur Tili Nehwi (Sintaksisi) ("Uyghur Syntax"), Uyghur Til-Edebiyat Qaidiliri (Istilistikisi) ("Uighur Rhetoric"), and Uyghur Tilining Addiy Imla Qaidisi ("Uyghur simple orthography"). These were unpublished mimeographs for the use of university students. He engaged in teaching while conducting his research, published as Türkiy Tillarning Qisqiche Tarihi ("Brief Introduction of Turkic Language") in Nanjing Time (Chinese magazine) in 1949.

Ibrahim opposed the Second East Turkestan Republic and was against the Ili Rebellion because it was backed by the Soviets and Stalin. The former ETR leader Saifuddin Azizi later apologized to Ibrahim and admitted that his opposition to the East Turkestan Republic was the correct thing to do.

After the establishment of the People's Republic of China in 1949, he was transferred to Beijing and worked at the State Nationalities Commission (Dölet Ishlar Komitéti) for three years. He transferred to the Nationalities Press (Milletler Neshriyati) in 1955. Working together with a large team of scholars, he helped publish an 18th-century volume of a Dictionary in Five Languages (Besh Tilliq Manjuche Lughet), a dictionary representing the common linguistic and cultural heritage of several ethnic groups in China. This dictionary includes Manchu, Tibetan, Mongolian, Uyghur, and Chinese.

== Second incarceration ==
Muti'i spent eighteen years of his adult life in jail because of the Cultural Revolution (1966–1976) as a result of having been wrongly charged of crime during the period of internal political strife and ideological conflict. However, he continued his studies while incarcerated.

== Additional scholarship ==
After the Cultural Revolution his work resumed and was relocated to the Language Institute of Xinjiang Academy of Social Sciences in Xinjiang Uyghur Autonomous Region. He resumed his work, later joining other linguists on a six-year project to research and to translate and publish a Uyghur Turkic Dictionary (Dīwān Lughāt al-Turk) to Modern Uyghur.

Beginning in 1984, he did field work in Kashgar with Mirsultan Osmanov, a well-known Uyghur linguist also one of his best students. Their goal was to find Mahmud Kashgari's exact hometown and mausoleum, which they identified, based on numerous facts, in their paper Mehmud Kashgherining Yurti, Hayati we Maziri Toghrisida "On the Hometown, Biography and Shrine of Mahmud al-Kashgari".

Ibrahim Muti'i visited Harvard University in April 1989 to attend a conference. He "tells the story of meeting a relative of his beloved Tatar elementary school teacher. It was a joyful encounter that gave Ibrahim an opportunity to express how significant a role model his teacher had been". He also presented at the conference at Harvard University. His paper was about Uyghur Islamic Madarasa in the Early Period of Islam in Xinjiang. The paper published in the Conference Proceedings.

He translated and edited many classical literary books into modern Uyghur. Among these were Irk Bitig ("Book of divination") and Maytiri Simit (Maitreya). He not only helped students, but also helped coordinate lectures in relevant departments for young and old researchers in the Uyghur language. He also trained a number of linguistic experts and scholars, among them Mirsultan Osmanov (1929– ) who is a famous linguist, Abduréhim Ötkür (1923–1995) who was a famous poet and scholar and he was one of the pioneers in the field of modern Uyghur literature, and Lutpulla Mutellip (1923–1945) was one of the pioneers in the field of modern Uyghur literature and poet, and many others.

In 1990, in honor of his 70th birthday, Milletler Neshriyati ("Nationalities Publishing House") in Beijing published a book entitled Ibrahim Muti'i Ilmiy Maqaliliri ("Ibrahim Muti'i Proceedings"). Nationalities Publishing House initially planned to publish a second volume, but was unable to locate the originals, which had sold out and were no longer available. A single volume with the entire collection of his papers was published in 2007. It included the original contents of the 1990s version as well as twenty-two additional papers.

== Significance ==
Ibrahim Muti'i was among the foremost Uyghur scholars of the 20th century. His significant contributions to Uyghur scholarship and culture were as a literary translator, an editor and publisher and a teacher who also conducted research. He was a significant educator because he was the first teacher to offer new courses in the study of Uyghur literature and language pedagogy while also writing and editing textbooks for these courses. He integrated teaching and research, publishing many valuable papers on Turkic languages. He inspired young scholars to enter the ranks of language and literature studies.

== Published works ==
- Ibrahim Muti'i, 1996. Shéir Tili Toghrisida [On the Language of Poetry], Til we terjime [Language and Translation] Vol.4
- Ibrahim Muti'i, 1992. Uyghur Tilida Söz Urghusi we Ibare Intonatsiyisi [Word-stress and Intonation of Modern Uyghur], Radio-Téléwiziye Gülzari [Radio-TV Garden] Vol.2
- Ibrahim Muti'i, 2007. Uyghur Tilining Tereqqiyat Tarixini Dewrlerge Bölüsh Mesilisi [The Problem on the Classification of the Developing Process of Uyghur Language] Milletler Neshriyati, Nationalities Publishing House in Beijing pp. 154–173
- Ibrahim Muti'i, 2007 "Xaqaniye Tili" we Uning Uyghur Tili Tarixida Tutqan Orni [Hakaniya Language and its Position in the Uyghur Language History] Milletler Neshriyati, Nationalities Publishing House in Beijing pp. 174–183
- Ibrahim Muti'i, 2007. Uyghurlarning Tili we Yéziqi Heqqide [On the Language and Scripts of Uyghur] Milletler Neshriyati, Nationalities Publishing House in Beijing pp. 240–247
- Ibrahim Muti'i, 2007. Qedimki Uyghurchidiki Shéiriyetke Ait Atalghular [Terms of Poetry in the Old Uyghur] Milletler Neshriyati, Nationalities Publishing House in Beijing pp. 303–309
- Ibrahim Muti'i, 2007. "Divanu Lughatit Turk" we uning Aptori Mehmud Kashgheri [Divan Lughat-at Turk and its Author Mahmoud Al-Kashgari] Milletler Neshriyati, Nationalities Publishing House in Beijing pp. 310–323
- Ibrahim Muti'i, 1983. Mehmud Kashgherining Yurti, Hayati we Maziri Toghrisida [On the Hometown, Biography and Shrine of Mahmoud Al-Kashgari] Qeshqer Edebiyati [Kashgar Literature] Vol.2
- Ibrahim Muti'i, 2007. Idiqut Uyghur Xanliqi Dewride Qedimki Uyghur Edebiy Tili Tereqqiyatigha Zor Hesse Qoshqan Tilshunas, Terjiman, Alimlarning Wekili-Prtanrakshit Karmawazhik [Pritanrakshit Karmavzhik, a Translator and Linguist Who Had Great Contributions to the Development of Uyghur Literary Language an Qocho Uyghur Kingdom] Milletler Neshriyati, Nationalities Publishing House in Beijing pp. 380–393
- Ibrahim Muti'i, 1984. Kuchaliq Meshhur Terjiman Kumrajiwaning Terjime Usulliri [Well-known Translator Komrajiwa and his Translation Methods] Til we terjime [Language and Translation] Vol.3
- Ibrahim Muti'i, 1997 "Divanu Lughatit Turk"ning Englizche Terjimisining Neshriyat Muqeddimisi [On the Introduction of the English Translation of Diwan-lughat-at Turk ] Xinjiang Uniwérsitéti Ilmiy Zhornili [Journal of Xinjiang Universiti] Vol.1

== Bibliography ==
- Ibrahim Muti'i, 2007 Ibrahim Muti'i Ilmiy Maqaliliri [Ibrahim Muti'i Proceedings] Milletler Neshriyati, Nationalities Publishing House in Beijing
- Ibrahim, Tursunbek el. (2011): Bilqut Balilar Shexs Hékayiliri [Characters Story] edit by Xinjiang Bilqut Shérkiti [Xinjiang Bilqut Company], Xinjiang Élictiron-Ünsin Neshriyati [Xinjiang Audiovisual Press]
- William Clark (2011): Ibrahim's story, Asian Ethnicity, (12:2, 203–219)
- Muhemmet Tahirjan, 2003 Hazirqi Zaman Uyghur Tilshunasliqining Bashlamchisi, Ataqliq Jamaet Erbabi- Ibrahim Muti'i [Ibrahim Muti'i, A Famous Figure, Leading Expert of the Modern Uyghur LInguistics] Til we terjime [Language and Translation] Vol.1
