= Ili Rebellion =

1944–1946 uprising in northern Xinjiang, China

Ili Rebellion East Turkestan National Revolution Three Districts Revolution
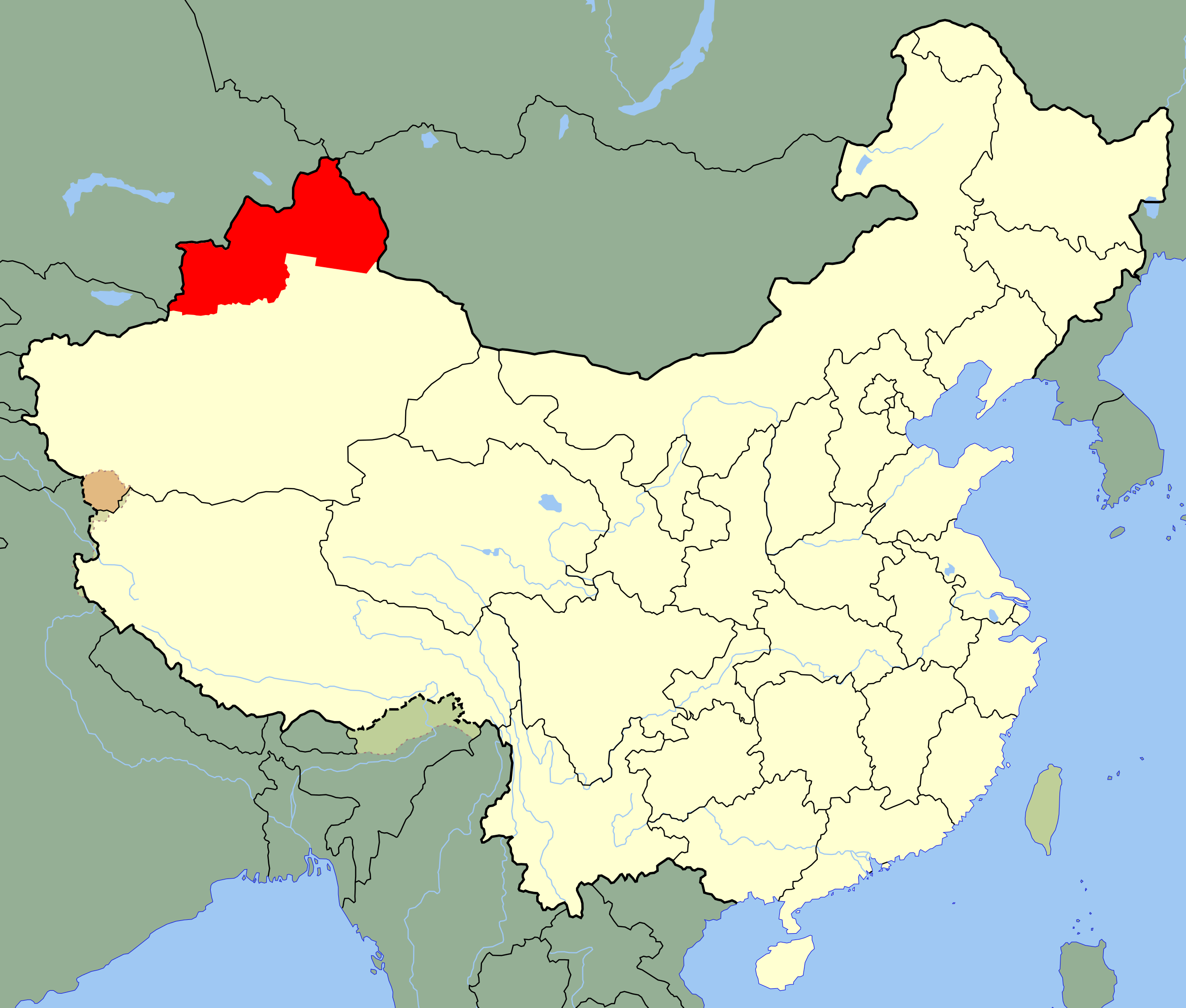
- Territorial extent of the Second East Turkestan Republic (red), encompassing the three districts of Ili, Tarbagatay and Altay
| Date | 7 November 1944 – 26 June 1946 (1 year, 7 months, 2 weeks and 5 days) |
| Location | Ili, Tarbagatay, and Altay districts in northern Xinjiang Province, Republic of China |
| Result | Independence of the East Turkestan Republic declared on 12 November 1944; Ceasefire and establishment of a coalition government between the East Turkestan Republic and Republic of China on 26 June 1946; Collapse of the coalition government on 12 August 1947 and resumption of independent governance in the former territories of the East Turkestan Republic |

Belligerents
| China | East Turkestan; Soviet Union |

Commanders and leaders
| Chiang Kai-shek; Bai Chongxi; Ma Bufang; Zhang Zhizhong; Ma Chengxiang; Ma Xizhen; Han Youwen; Liu Bindi †; Osman Batur; Yulbars Khan; Masud Sabri | Elihan Tore; Ehmetjan Qasimi; Abdukerim Abbasov; Piotr Alexandrov; Povel Maskolyov; Zunun Taipov; Seypidin Azizi; Ishaq Beg Munonov; Dalelkhan Sugirbayev; Fotiy Leskin; Ivan Polinov |

Units involved
| National Revolutionary Army: 100,000 infantry and cavalry; Han Chinese 2nd Army (4 divisions); Hui Chinese Muslim 5th Cavalry Army; Hui Chinese Muslim 42nd Cavalry Army; Hui Chinese Muslim 14th Cavalry regiment; Kazakh, Mongol, and White Russians Kuomintang loyalists | East Turkestan National Army; Thousands of Soviet Red Army troops |

Casualties and losses
| Total casualties unknown, many Chinese civilians killed in Ili alongside a number of Chinese soldiers | Total casualties unknown, heavy losses among Russian settlers fighting for the Second East Turkestan Republic, many civilian and military losses taken |

The Ili Rebellion (simplified Chinese: 伊宁事变; traditional Chinese: 伊寧事變; pinyin: Yīníng Shìbiàn) was a separatist uprising by the Turkic peoples of northern Xinjiang (East Turkestan) against the Kuomintang government of the Republic of China, from 1944 to 1946. The Ili Rebellion began with the East Turkestan National Revolution, known in Chinese historiography as the Three Districts Revolution (simplified Chinese: 三区革命; traditional Chinese: 三區革命; pinyin: Sān-qū Gémìng; Uyghur: ئۈچ ۋىلايەت ئىنقىلابى), which saw the establishment of the Second East Turkestan Republic. The leadership was dominated by Uyghurs, but the population consisted mostly of Kazakhs.

== Background ==
The Soviet Union installed Sheng Shicai as its puppet ruler in Xinjiang in the 1934 Soviet Invasion of Xinjiang and later further entrenched its position in the Islamic rebellion in Xinjiang (1937). Soviet Red Army forces were stationed in Xinjiang oases, such as the Soviet "Eighth Regiment" in Hami, and Soviet technicians and engineers flooded the province. During the Second World War, the Kuomintang government of the Republic of China sought to undermine the Soviet presence in Xinjiang and to retake the province from Soviet control. The Kuomintang worked with the Hui Muslim Ma Clique warlord of Qinghai, General Ma Bufang, to build up its military forces around Xinjiang and to increase the pressure on Sheng Shicai and the Soviets.

In 1942, Sheng Shicai switched his allegiance to the Kuomintang after major Soviet defeats at the hands of the Germans in the war, and all Soviet Red Army military forces and technicians residing in the province were expelled. The Republic of China National Revolutionary Army units and soldiers belonging to Ma Bufang moved into Xinjiang to take control of the province. Ma helped the Kuomintang build roadways linking Qinghai and Xinjiang, which helped both of them bring Xinjiang under their influence. In 1944, the Soviets took advantage of discontent among the Turkic peoples of the Ili region in northern Xinjiang to support a rebellion against Kuomintang rule in the province to reassert Soviet influence in the region.

== Fighting ==
=== Kulja revolt ===
Many of the Turkic peoples of the Ili region of Xinjiang had close cultural, political and economic ties with Russia and later the Soviet Union. Many of them were educated in the Soviet Union, and a community of Russian settlers lived in the region. As a result, many of the Turkic rebels fled to the Soviet Union and obtained Soviet assistance in creating the Sinkiang Turkic People's Liberation Committee (STPNLC) in 1943 to revolt against the Kuomintang rule in Ili. The pro-Soviet Uyghur who later became leader of the revolt, Ehmetjan Qasimi, was Soviet-educated and described as "Stalin's man" and as a "Communist-minded progressive".

The rebels assaulted Kulja on 7 November 1944, rapidly took over parts of the city, and massacred Kuomintang troops. However, the rebels encountered fierce resistance from Kuomintang forces holed up in the power and central police stations and did not take them until the 13th. The creation of the "East Turkestan Republic" (ETR) was declared on the 15th.

The Soviet Army assisted the Ili Uyghur army in capturing several towns and airbases. Local ethnic Russians, including descendants of 19th century settlers and of White Russians, also helped the Soviet Red Army and the Ili Army rebels and suffered heavy losses. Many leaders of the East Turkestan Republic were Soviet agents or affiliated with the Soviet Union, like Abdukerim Abbasov, Ishaq Beg, Seypidin Azizi and the White Russians Fotiy Leskin, Ivan Polinov and Glimkin. When the rebels ran into trouble taking the vital Airambek airfield from the Chinese, Soviet military forces directly intervened and helped to mortar Airambek and to reduce the Chinese stronghold.

=== Massacres ===
The rebels engaged in massacres of Han Chinese civilians, especially targeting people affiliated with the Kuomintang and Sheng Shicai. In the "Kulja Declaration" issued on 5 January 1945, the East Turkestan Republic proclaimed that it would "sweep away the Han Chinese" and threatened to extract a "blood debt" from the Han. The ETR also declared that it would seek to establish especially-cordial ties with the Soviets. The ETR later de-emphasized the anti-Han tone in its official proclamations after it had finished massacring most of the Han civilians in its area. The massacres against the Han occurred mostly in 1944–1945, with the KMT responding in kind by torturing, killing, and mutilating ETR prisoners. In territory controlled by the ETR like Kulja, various repressive measures were carried out, such as establishing a Soviet-style secret police organization, barring Han from owning weapons, and making Russian and Turkic languages official to replace Chinese.

While the non-Muslim Tungusic peoples like the Xibe played a large role in helping the rebels by supplying them with crops, the local Muslim Tungan (Hui) in Ili gave an insignificant and negligible contribution to the rebels or did not assist them at all.

=== Formation of Ili National Army ===
The Ili National Army (INA), which was established on 8 April 1945 as the military arm of the ETR, was led by the Kyrgyz Ishaq Beg and the Russians Polinov and Leskin. All three were pro-Soviet and had a history of military service with Soviet-associated forces. The Soviets supplied the INA with ammunition and Russian-style uniforms, and Soviet troops directly helped INA troops fight against the Chinese forces. The INA uniforms and flags all had insignia with the Russian acronym for "East Turkestan Republic", ВТР in Cyrillic (Восточная Туркестанская Республика). The Soviets admitted their support of the rebels decades later by transmitting a radio broadcast in Uyghur from Radio Tashkent into Xinjiang on 14 May 1967 that boasted that the Soviets had trained and armed the ETR forces against China. Thousands of Soviet troops assisted Turkic rebels in fighting the Chinese army. In October 1945, suspected Soviet planes attacked Chinese positions.

As the Soviet Red Army and Turkic Uyghur Ili Army advanced with Soviet air support against poorly-prepared Chinese forces, they almost succeeded in reaching Ürümqi, but the Chinese military threw up rings of defences around the area and sent Chinese Muslim cavalry to halt the advance of the Turkic Muslim rebels. Thousands of Chinese Muslim troops under General Ma Bufang and his nephew General Ma Chengxiang poured into Xinjiang from Qinghai to combat the Soviet and Turkic Uyghur forces.

Much of the Ili army and equipment originated from the Soviet Union. The Ili army pushed Chinese forces across the plains and reached Kashgar, Kaghlik and Yarkand. However, the Uyghurs in the oases gave no support to the Soviet-backed rebels and, as a result, the Chinese Army expelled them. The Ili rebels then butchered livestock belonging to Kyrgyz and Tajiks of Xinjiang. The Soviet-backed insurgents moved aggressively against the Kyrgyz and Tajiks and destroyed their crops. The Chinese beat back the Soviet-supported rebellion in Sarikol from August 1945 to 46 by defeating the siege of the "tribesman" around Yarkand when they had risen up in rebellion in Nanchiang around Sarikol and by killing Red Army officers.

The Chinese Muslim Ma Clique warlord of Qinghai, Ma Bufang, was sent with his cavalry to Ürümqi by the Kuomintang in 1945 to protect it from the Uyghur rebels of Ili. In 1945, the Tungan (Hui) 5th and 42nd Cavalry were sent from Qinghai to Xinjiang, where they reinforced the KMT 2nd Army, made up of four divisions. Their combined forces totalled 100,000 Hui and Han troops, who served under KMT command in 1945. It was reported the Soviets was eager to "liquidate" Ma Bufang. General Ma Chengxiang, another Hui Ma Clique officer and nephew of Ma Bufang, commanded the 1st Cavalry Division in Xinjiang under the KMT, which was formerly the Gansu 5th Cavalry Army. A ceasefire was declared in early June 1946, with the Second East Turkestan Republic in control of Ili and the Chinese in control of the rest of Xinjiang, including Ürümqi. On 27 June 1946, the Interim Government of the East Turkestan Republic passed Resolution 324 to transform the Interim Government of the East Turkestan Republic into the Ili District Council of Xinjiang Province and dissolve the ETR (the resolution used 'East Turkestan' to denote Xinjiang Province).

== 1947 unrest ==
The unpopular Governor Wu Zhongxin was replaced after the ceasefire with Zhang Zhizhong, who implemented pro-minority policies to placate the Turkic population. Bai Chongxi, the Defense Minister of China and a Muslim, was considered for appointment in 1947 as Governor of Xinjiang, but the position was given instead to Masud Sabri, a pro-Kuomintang pan-Turkist Uyghur who was anti-Soviet. Sabri was close to conservatives in the CC Clique of the Kuomintang and undid all of Zhang Zhizhong's pro-minority reforms, which set off revolts and riots in oases like Turfan.

Ehmetjan Qasimi, the Uyghur Ili leader, was strongly against Masud Sabri becoming governor. Ehmetjan demanded that Sabri be sacked as governor as one of the conditions for his agreeing to visit Nanjing. All races in the Ili region were forcibly conscripted into the Uyghur Ili army, except the Han. The Uyghurs and Soviets massacred ethnic Han living in Ili and drove them from the region.

Salar Muslim General Han Youwen, who served under Ma Bufang, commanded the Pau-an-dui (保安隊; pacification soldiers), composed of three 340-man battalions. They were composed of men of many groups, including Kazakhs, Mongols and White Russians serving the Chinese regime. He served with Osman Batur and his Kazakh forces in fighting the ETR Ili Uyghur and Soviet forces. The acting Soviet consul at Chenghua, Dipshatoff, directed the Red Army in aiding ETR Ili forces against Osman's Kazakhs. The ETR forces in the Ashan zone were attacked, defeated and killed by Osman's Kazakh forces during a Chinese-supported offensive in September 1947. Osman's Kazakhs seized most of the towns in the Ashan zone from the ETR.

Ma Chengxiang was the commander of the 5th Cavalry Unit, which was stationed in Xinjiang. Over 60,000 soldiers were in the Ili army according to Gen. Sung. Ma Chengxiang, a Kuomintang Chinese Muslim general and the nephew of Ma Bufang, allegedly commanded his Chinese Muslim cavalry to massacre Uyghurs during an uprising in 1948 in Turfan.

The Kuomintang CC Clique employed countermeasures in Xinjiang to prevent the traditionalist religious Uyghurs in the oases in southern Xinjiang from defecting to the pro-Soviet ETR Uyghurs in Ili in northern Xinjiang. The Kuomintang allowed three anti-Soviet Pan-Turkic nationalist Uyghurs, Masud Sabri, Muhammad Amin Bughra and Isa Yusuf Alptekin, to write and publish pan-Turkic nationalist propaganda to incite the Turkic peoples against the Soviets, greatly angering the Soviet authorities. Isa's anti-Soviet sentiment drew Soviet ire, while pro-Soviet sentiment was espoused by Burhan. The Uyghur linguist Ibrahim Muti'i opposed the Second East Turkestan Republic and was against the Ili Rebellion because it was backed by the Soviets and Stalin. The former ETR leader Seypidin Azizi later apologized to Ibrahim and admitted that his opposition to the East Turkestan Republic was correct.

The marriages between Muslim (Uyghur) women and Han Chinese men infuriated the Uyghur leader Isa Yusuf Alptekin. In Ürümqi (Uyghur) Muslim women who married Han Chinese men were assaulted by hordes of (Uyghur) Muslims on 11 July 1947, and the women were seized and kidnapped by the hordes. Old (Uyghur) Muslim men forcibly married these women. In response to the chaos a curfew was placed at 11:00 p.m.

American telegrams reported that the Soviet secret police threatened to assassinate Muslim leaders from Ining and put pressure on them to flee to "inner China" via Tihwa (Ürümqi). White Russians grew fearful of Muslim mobs as they chanted, "We freed ourselves from the yellow men, now we must destroy the white."

== Battle of Baitag Bogd ==
After the Mongolian People's Republic became involved in a border dispute with the Republic of China, a Chinese Muslim Hui cavalry regiment was sent in response by the Chinese government to attack Mongol and Soviet positions. As commander of the 1st Cavalry Division, Major General Han Youwen was sent by the Kuomintang military command to Beitashan with a company of troops to reinforce Ma Xizhen. They arrived approximately three months before the fighting broke out. At Pei-ta-shan, General Han was in command of all the Muslim cavalry defending against Soviet and Mongol forces. Han said to A. Doak Barnett, an American reporter, that he "believed the border should be about 40 miles to the north of the mountains".

Chinese Muslim and Turkic Kazakh forces working for the Kuomintang fought Soviet Russian and Mongol troops. In June 1947 the Mongols and the Soviets launched an attack against the Kazakhs and drove them back to the Chinese side. However, fighting continued for another year, with 13 clashes taking place between 5 June 1947 and July 1948. Elite Qinghai Chinese Muslim cavalry were sent by the Kuomintang to destroy the Mongols and the Russians in 1947.

Salar Muslim General Han Youwen's 1st Division received at Beitashan Osman's forces after he retreated in battle. Qitai County had the headquarters of the Han Youwen's 1st Division of the 5th Army in 1946. The following year, during the Beitashan Incident, Ma Xizhen fought the Mongols.

During the war against the Ili separatists, Han Youwen performed a prayer on the snow-covered ground after he had parked his car on the road after a defeat inflicted upon the Ili National Army.

== Political accession of Xinjiang to Chinese communist rule ==
The conflict ended with the arrival of the Chinese Communists in the region in 1949. On 19 August 1949, Mao Zedong, the leader of the Chinese Communists, invited the leaders of the Three Districts to attend the Inaugural Chinese People’s Political Consultative Conference to be held in Beijing. Mao telegrammed, "You did a great contribution to liberation of Xinjiang and China". On 22 August, five leaders of the Three Districts, Ehmetjan Qasimi, Abdukerim Abbasov, Ishaq Beg Munonov, Luo Zhi and Dalelkhan Sugirbayev, boarded a Soviet plane in Almaty and were headed for Chita but were said to have perished in a plane accident near Lake Baikal, a crash was widely suspected to be an assassination ordered by Joseph Stalin. On hearing of the plane crash an ETR commander in Gulja, Rokhmannov, ordered a revenge massacre of Han Chinese in which more than 7,000 were killed. When the Communists arrived, they took reprisals, killing him and many of his soldiers.

On 3 September three other former ETR leaders, including Seypidin Azizi, arrived in Beijing by train and agreed to join the People’s Republic of China, which was founded on 1 October. The deaths of the other former ETR leaders were not announced until December, after the Chinese Communists' People's Liberation Army (PLA) had control of northern Xinjiang and had reorganized the military forces of the Three Districts into the PLA. Several former ETR commanders joined the PLA.

On 25 September, the Nationalist leaders in Dihua, Tao Zhiyue and Burhan Shahidi, announced the formal surrender of the Nationalist forces in Xinjiang to the Chinese Communists. On 12 October, the Communist People's Liberation Army entered Xinjiang. Many other Kuomintang generals in Xinjiang like the Salar Muslim General Han Youwen joined in the defection to the PLA. They continued to serve in the PLA as officers in Xinjiang. Other Nationalist leaders who refused to submit fled to Taiwan or Turkey. Ma Chengxiang fled via India to Taiwan. Muhammad Amin Bughra and Isa Yusuf Alptekin fled to Turkey. Masud Sabri was arrested by the Chinese Communists and died in prison in 1952.

The only organized resistance the PLA encountered was from Osman Batur's Kazakh militia and from Yulbars Khan's White Russian and Hui troops, who served the Republic of China. Batur pledged his allegiance to the Kuomintang and was killed in 1951. Yulbars Khan battled PLA forces at the Battle of Yiwu and fled through Tibet by evading the harassing forces of the Dalai Lama and escaped via India to Taiwan to join the Republic of China, which appointed him the governor of Xinjiang Province in exile. The Xinjiang Uyghur Autonomous Region of the PRC was established on 1 October 1955, replacing the Xinjiang Province (1884–1955).

== American telegrams ==
Multiple telegrams were exchanged among the Chinese government, the Mongolians, the American government, the Uyghur Ili regime, and the Soviet Union and were preserved by American agents and sent to Washington, DC.

== Related events and people ==
The Soviet Union set up a similar puppet state in Pahlavi dynasty Iran in the form of the Azerbaijan People's Government and Republic of Mahabad The Soviet Union used comparable methods and tactics in both Xinjiang and Iran when it established the Kurdish Republic of Mahabad and Autonomous Republic of Azerbaijan. The American Ambassador to the Soviet Union sent a telegram back to Washington, DC, in which he said that the situations in Iranian Azerbaijan and in Xinjiang were similar.

According to her autobiography, Dragon Fighter: One Woman's Epic Struggle for Peace with China, Rebiya Kadeer's father served with pro-Soviet Uyghur rebels under the Second East Turkestan Republic in the Ili Rebellion (Three Province Rebellion) in 1944 to 1946, using Soviet assistance and aid to fight the Republic of China government under Chiang Kai-shek. Kadeer and her family were close friends with White Russian exiles living in Xinjiang and Kadeer recalled that many Uyghurs thought Russian culture was "more advanced" than that of the Uyghurs and they "respected" the Russians a lot.

There was a split in the East Turkestan Independence Movement between two branches, one of them pro-Soviet and supported by the Soviet Union and the other being anti-Soviet pan-Turkic and having members based in Turkey and western countries. The Pan-Turkist ones were the three Effendis, (ئۈچ ئەپەندى; Üch Äpändi) Aisa Alptekin, Memtimin Bughra, and Masud Sabri. The Second East Turkestan Republic attacked them as Kuomintang "puppets". Anti-Soviet sentiment was espoused by Isa, and pro-Soviet sentiment was espoused by Burhan. The Soviets were angered by Isa. Violence broke out between supporters of the Soviets and supporters of Turkey because of a film on the Russo Turkish wars in 1949 at Xinjiang College according to Abdurahim Amin in Dihua (Ürümqi).

The Ili Rebellion is mentioned and praised in an Arabic Islamist pamphlet about China and the Soviet Union's Muslims, which was picked up and translated in 1960 into English in Tehran by American government agents. It was originally written by Mohammed Aziz Ismail and Mohammed Sa'id Ismail.

== See also ==
- Amur Military Flotilla
- Sino-Soviet conflict (1929)
- Soviet Invasion of Xinjiang
- Soviet Central Asia
