= Ma Chengxiang =

Chinese Muslim general (1914–1991)

- 馬呈祥
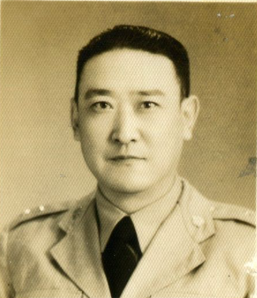
- Ma Chengxiang
- Born: 1914; Gansu, Republic of China
- Died: 15 April 1991 (aged 76–77); Taipei, Taiwan
- Military career
- Allegiance: Republic of China
- Service years: 1936–1969
- Rank: Lieutenant General
- Unit: 5th Cavalry Army
- Conflicts: Ili Rebellion; Pei-ta-shan Incident; Chinese Civil War; Ningxia Campaign

Ma Chengxiang (1914 – 15 April 1991) (simplified Chinese: 马呈祥; traditional Chinese: 馬呈祥; pinyin: Mǎ Chéngxiáng; Wade–Giles: Ma Chêng-hsiang, Xiao'erjing: ﻣَﺎ ﭼْﻊ ﺷِﯿْﺎ) was a Chinese Muslim general in the National Revolutionary Army. He was the son of Ma Qing (馬慶) and nephew of generals Ma Buqing and Ma Bufang. A daughter of Ma Buqing was married to him. He commanded Hui cavalry in Xinjiang, the 5th cavalry army. Ma was a member of the Chinese Nationalist Kuomintang party and a hardliner. Ma Chengxiang commanded the Xinjiang First Cavalry Division, which was formerly stationed in Gansu where it was known as the Fifth Cavalry Army.

He commanded Chinese Muslim troops against the Uighur armies of the Second East Turkestan Republic during the Ili Rebellion and the People's Liberation Army in Xinjiang, Ningxia, and Gansu. His cavalry was deployed during the Ningxia Campaign. Ma Chengxiang, the nationalist cavalry commander in Xinjiang, led 200-300 civilians and military men such as officers and soldiers and their families fleeing China to settle in Saudi Arabia, with his uncle, Ma Bufang. His family fled Qinghai to go to Hong Kong as a stopover, then fled to Egypt.

According to Jack Chen, Ma Chengxiang used his Chinese Muslim cavalry to put down a revolt of Uyghurs during an uprising in 1948 in Turfan.

Elite Qinghai Chinese Muslim cavalry were sent by the Chinese Kuomintang to destroy the Mongols and the Russians in 1947 during the Pei-ta-shan Incident.

Ma was appointed as the commander of all the cavalry forces of the Kuomintang in Xinjiang. When the Communists invaded Xinjiang, Ma fled via the Pamirs in 1950 through India, then reached Egypt. Later, Ma Chengxiang returned to Taiwan, the Republic of China in 1950, where his father Ma Qing had fled. Ma Bufang stayed in Egypt. He resumed his job as a General and was elected to the Seventh Central Committee of the Kuomintang. He also became the Deputy General Officer Commanding Penghu Defense Command in 1956 and was appointed to the Planning Commission for the Recovery of the Mainland.

While Ma had fled to Taiwan, Han Youwen defected to the Communists. One of Ma Chengxiang's Hui officers, Ma Fuchen 馬輔臣, defected to the Communists.

Han Youwen wrote a letter to Ma Chengxiang after nearly 40 years of no contact. Ma Chengxiang met Han Youwen in Hong Kong.

== Career ==
- 1943 General Officer Commanding 5th Cavalry Army
- 1947 General Officer Commanding 1st Cavalry Division
- 1949 General Officer Commanding Cavalry Forces in Xinjiang
