= Ili National Army =

Armed forces of the Second East Turkestan Republic (1945–1949)

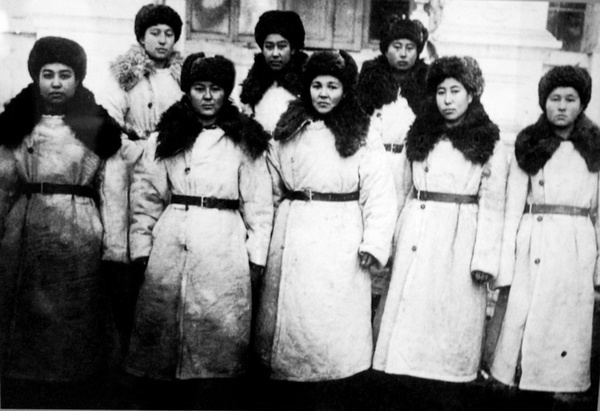
- Female soldiers, c. 1946
- Founded: 8 April 1945 – 22 December 1949
- Country: Second East Turkestan Republic
- Branch: Army
- Size: 50,000 infantry and 100,000 irregular reserves
- HQ: Ghulja
- Nickname: Milli Armiye (National Army)
- Colors: Blue and white
- March: Kozghal! (Arise!)
- Equipment: 12 artillery pieces 42 Fighter planes
- Engagements: Ili Rebellion

Commanders
- Marshal-in-chief: Elihan Tore
- Political commissar: Abdulkerim Abbas
- Notable commanders: General Ishaq Beg Munonov, General Dalelkhan Sugirbayev, Major Barat Hacı, Lt. Colonel Yusupbek Mukhlisi, General Zunun Taipov

The Ili National Army (INA; Chinese: 伊犁民族軍), originally known as the East Turkestan National Army (Uyghur: شەرقىي تۈركىستان مىللىي ئارمىيىسى, romanized: sherqiy türkistan milliy armiyisi), was the armed forces of the Second East Turkestan Republic (ETR). It originally consisted of six regiments: the Suidun Infantry Regiment, the Ghulja Regiment, the Kensai Regiment, the Ghulja Reserve Regiment, the Kazakh Cavalry Regiment, the Dungan Regiment, the Artillery Subdivision, the Sibo Subdivision, and the Mongol Subdivision. The last two subdivisions were later reformed to regiments. All regiments were armed with mostly German-made weapons that were provided by the Soviet Union on orders by Joseph Stalin. Its personnel was trained in the Soviet Union. Rebel aviation included 42 airplanes, which were captured in the Ghulja Kuomintang air base and repaired by Soviet military personnel.

== History ==
The East Turkestan National Army was formed on 8 April 1945. Elihan Tore was the Marshal of the East Turkestan National Army until his exile to the Soviet Union. Abdulkerim Abbas served as the INA's political director.

According to M. Kutlukov, in September 1945, the National Army made decisive victories over Kuomintang troops in Jungaria, where two newly formed full-sized Kuomintang divisions of around 25,000 troops, armed with American-made weapons, were trapped and completely annihilated, except for 6,000 soldiers and officers, including 7 generals, who surrendered, in battles in the highly-fortified Wusu-Shihezi district. This was in part thanks to the courage of soldiers and officers of the East Turkestan National Army, the experience of numerous Soviet military personnel and advisers who directly participated in the military operations, and the employment of heavy artillery fire and aerial bombings (by rebel aviation) of Kuomintang positions in the strategic oil-rich district.

On 22 December 1949, the National Army joined the People's Liberation Army as the Xinjiang 5th Corps, but then was reformed. Its divisions were transferred to the newly created Xinjiang Production and Construction Corps with all weapons of the divisions having been seized. Later, the national divisions were themselves entirely disbanded.

== Structure ==
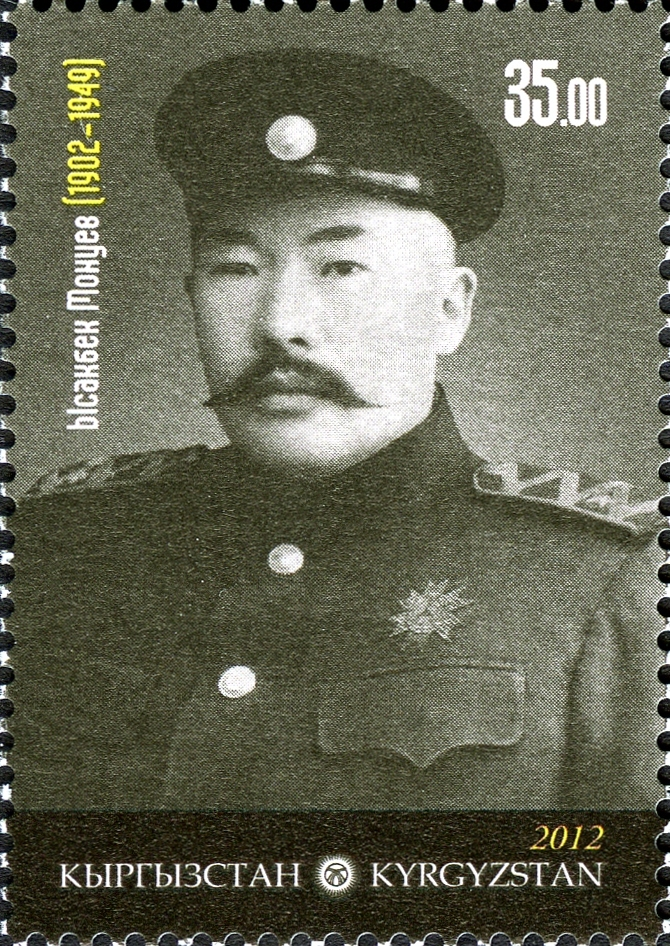
Ishaq Beg Munonov, deputy commander-in-chief of the East Turkestan National Army, wears the rank insignia of Major General.

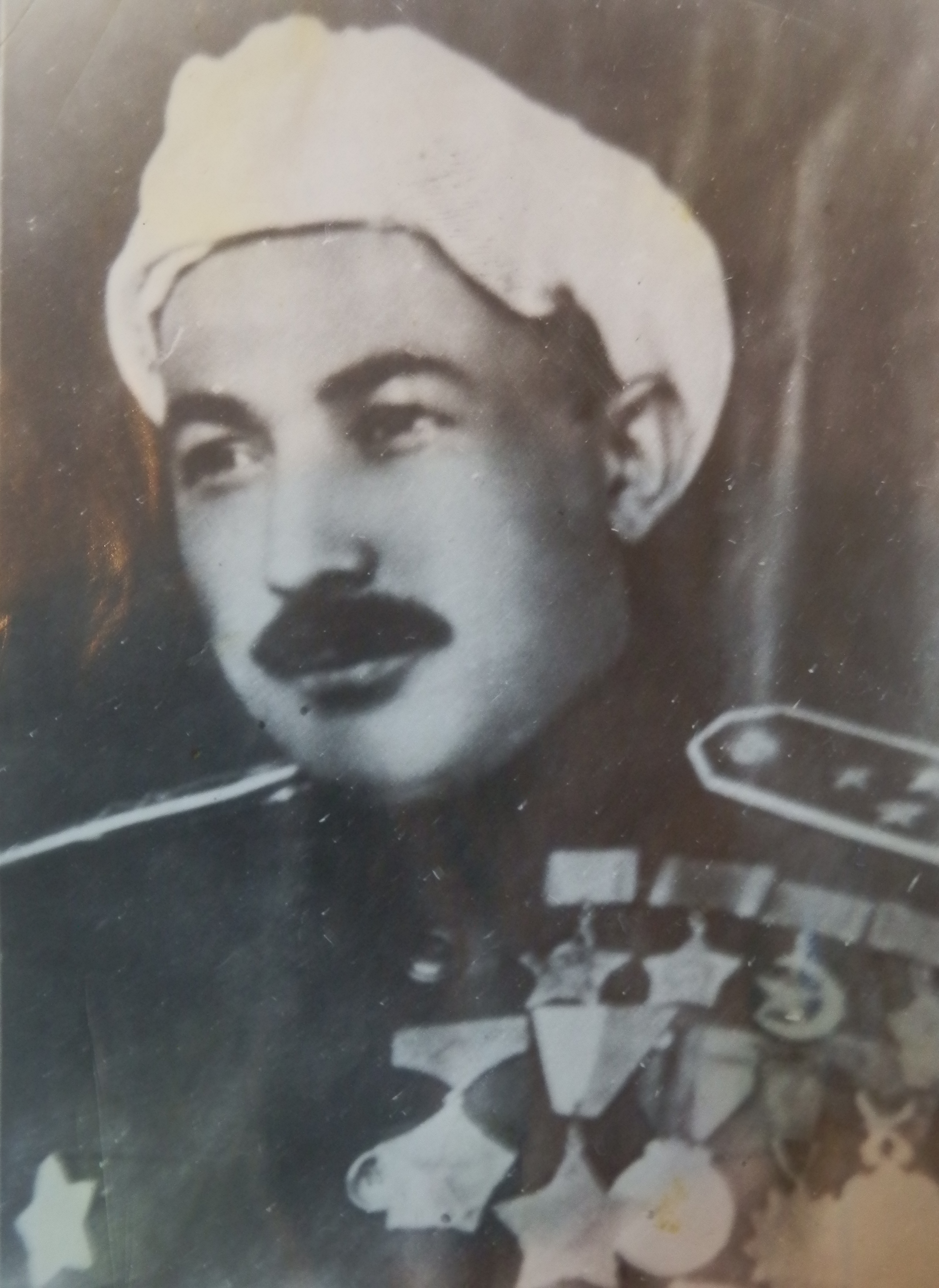
Ehmetjan Qasimi, president of the Second East Turkestan Republic, in the military uniform of the National Army.

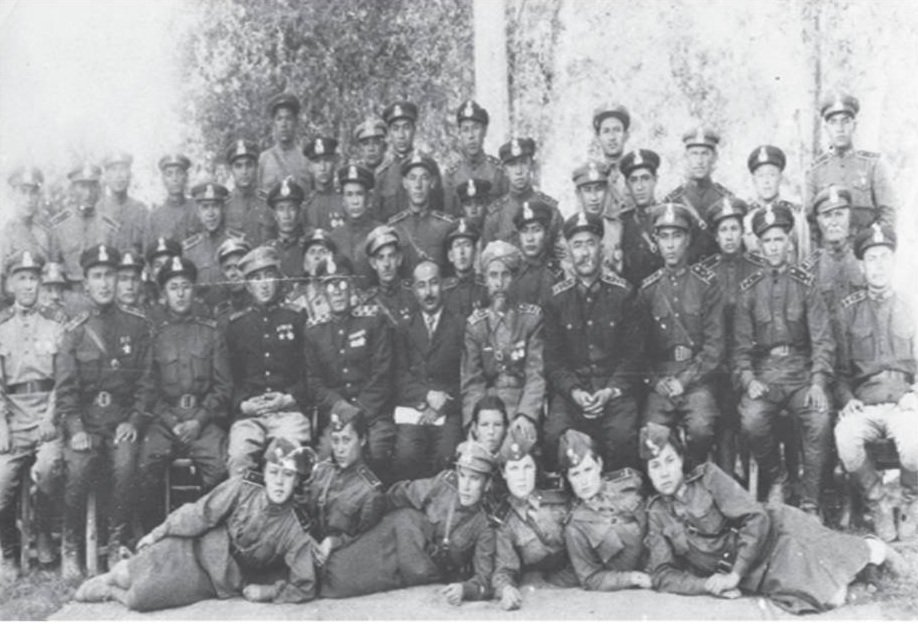
Officers of the East Turkestan National Army, c. 1945

The National Army of the East Turkestan Republic was formed on 8 April 1945 and originally consisted of six regiments:

1. Suidun infantry regiment
2. Ghulja regiment
3. Kensai regiment
4. Ghulja reserve regiment
5. Kazakh cavalry regiment
6. Tungan regiment
7. Sibo battalion
8. Mongol battalion

General conscription of all races, except the Chinese, into the National Army was enforced in the Ili zone.

Later, Sibo and Mongol battalions were upgraded to regiments. When Kazakh irregulars under Osman Batur defected to the Kuomintang in 1947, the Kazakh cavalry regiment of National Army also defected to Osman Batur. The motorized part of Army consisted of an Artillery Division, which included twelve cannons, two armoured vehicles, and two tanks. National aviation forces included forty-two airplanes, captured at a Kuomintang air base in Ghulja on 31 January 1945. All of them were damaged during the battle for the base. Some of the aircraft were repaired and put into service by Soviet military personnel in ETR. They participated in the battle between East Turkestan soldiers and the Kuomintang for Shihezi and Jinghe in September 1945.

The battle resulted in the capture of both Kuomintang bases and oil fields in Dushanzi. During the battle, one more Kuomintang airplane was captured, and detachments of National Army reached Manasi River north of Ürümqi, which caused panic in the city. Government offices were evacuated to Kumul. An offensive on Xinjiang's capital was cancelled because of direct pressure from Moscow on the ETR leadership, which agreed to follow orders from Moscow to begin peace talks with the Kuomintang and to cease fire on all frontiers. The first peace talks between the ETR and the Kuomintang followed Chiang Kai-shek's speech on China State Radio offering "to peacefully resolve Xinjiang crisis" with the rebels. The peace talks were mediated by the Soviet Union and started in Ürümqi on 14 October 1945.

The National Army enlisted 25,000 to 30,000 troops. In accordance with the peace agreement with Chiang Kai-shek that was signed on 6 June 1946, that number was reduced to 11,000 to 12,000 troops and restricted to stations in only the Three Districts (Ili, Tarbaghatai and Altai) of northern Xinjiang. National Army detachments were also withdrawn from southern Xinjiang, leaving the strategic city of Aksu and opening the road from Ürümqi to the Kashgar region. That allowed the Kuomintang to send 70,000 troops from 1946 to 1947 and quell the rebellion in the Pamir Mountains.

The rebellion was broken on 19 August 1945 in the Sariqol area of Taghdumbash Pamir. Rebels, led by the Uyghur Sadiq Khan Khoja from Kargilik and the Sariqoli Tajik Karavan Shah, captured all border posts near the Afghan, Soviet and Indian borders (Su-Bashi, Daftar, Mintaka Qarawul, Bulunqul), and a Tashkurgan fortress, killing Kuomintang troops. The rebels took Kuomintang troops by surprise as they celebrated the capitulation of Japanese Army in Manchuria. A few Kuomintang forces in Sariqol survived and fled to India during the rebel attack. The original base of the rebellion was situated on the mountainous Pamir village of Tagarma, near the Soviet border. On 15 September 1945, Tashkurgan rebels took Igiz-Yar on the road to Yangihissar, while another group of rebels simultaneously took Oitagh, Bostan-Terek and Tashmalik on the road to Kashgar.

By the end of 1945, Tashkurgan rebels had attacked Kashgar and Yarkand districts. On 2 January 1946, while the Preliminary Peace Agreement was signed in Ürümqi between ETR and Kuomintang representatives under Soviet mediation, rebels took Guma, Kargilik and Poskam, important towns that controlled communications between Xinjiang, Tibet and India. On 11 January 1946, the Kuomintang Army counter-attacked the Yarkand military zone, bringing reinforcements from Aksu Region. The counterattackers repelled Tashkurgan rebels from the outskirts of Yarkand, recaptured the towns of Poskam, Kargilik and Guma and brought the Tashkurgan Region back to Chinese control by the summer of 1946.

Only a few hundred of the 7000 rebels survived. The survivors retreated to the mountainous Pamir base in Qosrap (village in present-day Akto County). The National Army was partially active in Kashgar and Aksu from 1946 to 1949, the arrival of People's Liberation Army (PLA) units in Xinjiang.

Deng Liqun, a special envoy of Mao Zedong, arrived in Ghulja on 17 August 1949 to negotiate with the Three Districts leadership on the districts' future. Deng sent a secret telegram to Mao about the Three Districts forces the following day. He listed the forces as including about 14,000 troops, armed mostly with German weapons, heavy artillery, 120 military trucks and artillery-towing vehicles, and around 6,000 cavalry horses. Soviet military personnel were present in the Army and serviced 14 airplanes, which were used as bombers. On 22 December 1949, the National Army was incorporated into the PLA as its Xinjiang 5th Army Corps.

== Ranks ==
The ranks of the national army of the Second East Turkestan Republic (1944–1949) were similar in design to Soviet ranks since the army had been trained by the Soviet Union, which supported it during its war against the Kuomintang.

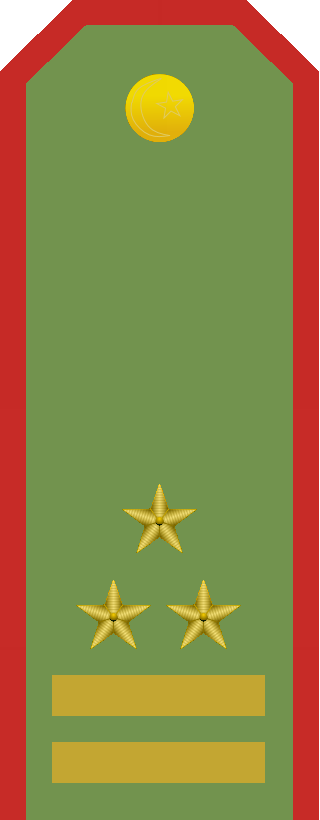
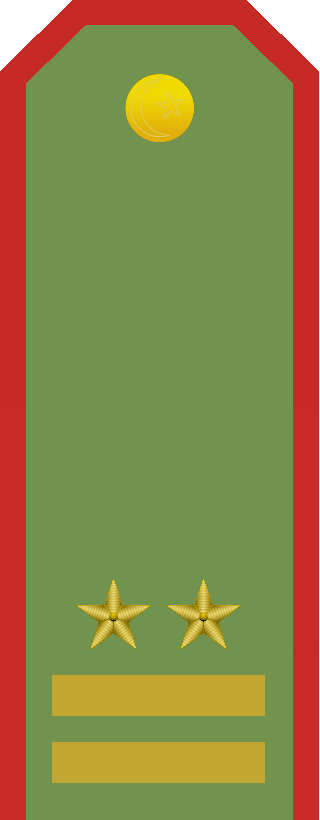
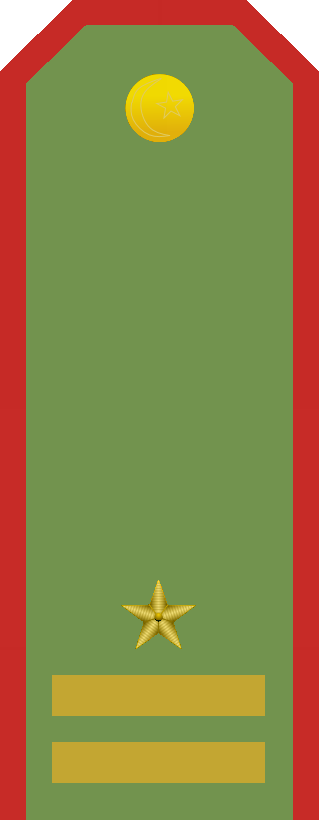
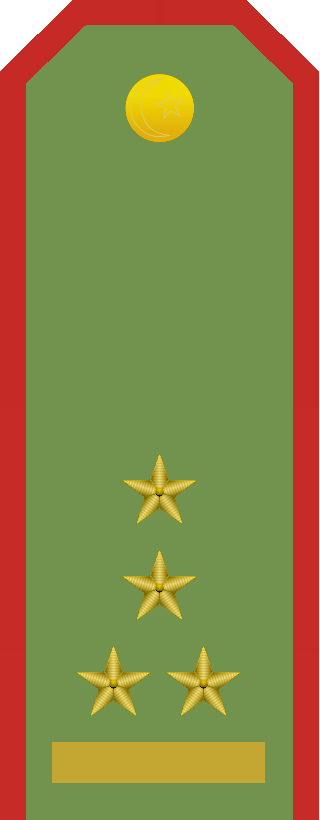
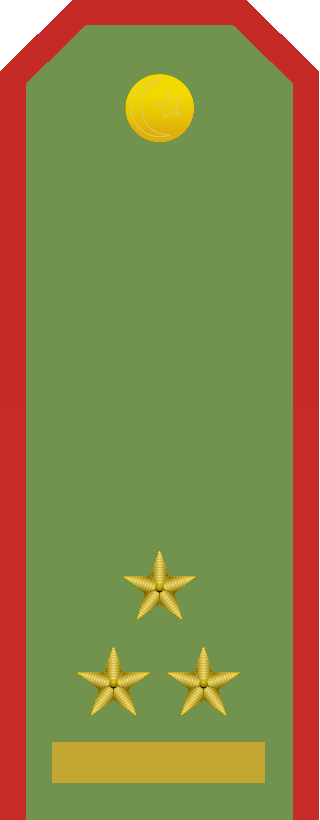
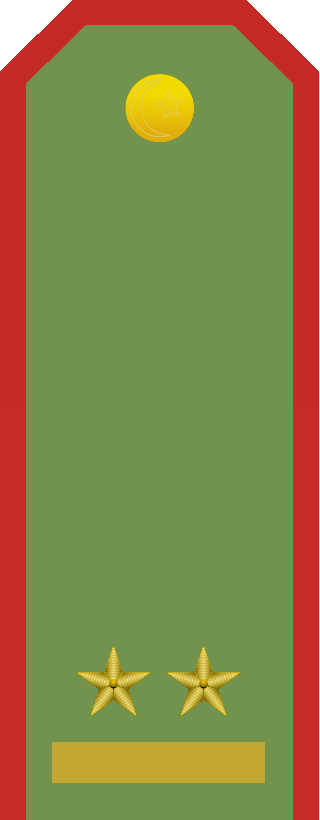
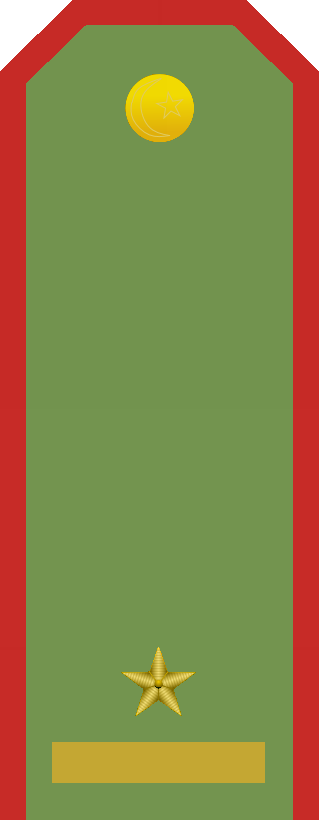
Rank group	General / flag officers				Senior officers			Junior officers
National Army of the Second East Turkestan Republic
National Army of the Second East Turkestan Republic	- 大將	- 上將	گېنىرال لېتىناتلىق gëniral lëtinatliq 中將	گېنىرال مايورلۇق gëniral mayorluq 少將	- 上校	- 中校	مايورلۇق mayorluq 少校	- 大尉	- 上尉	لېتىناتلىق lëtinatliq 中尉	- 少尉
	General of the Army	General	Lieutenant General	Major General	Colonel	Lieutenant Colonel	Major	Captain	Senior Lieutenant	Lieutenant	Junior Lieutenant

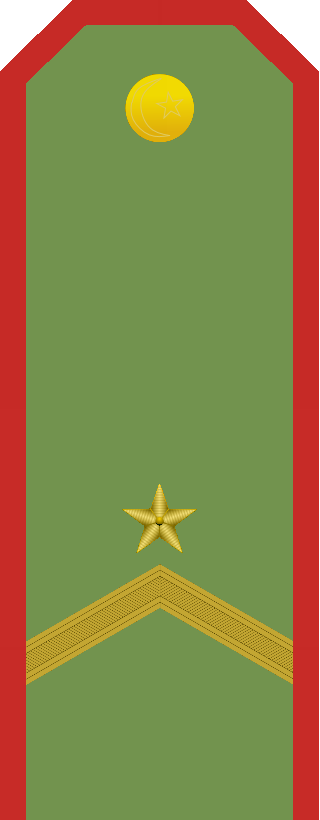
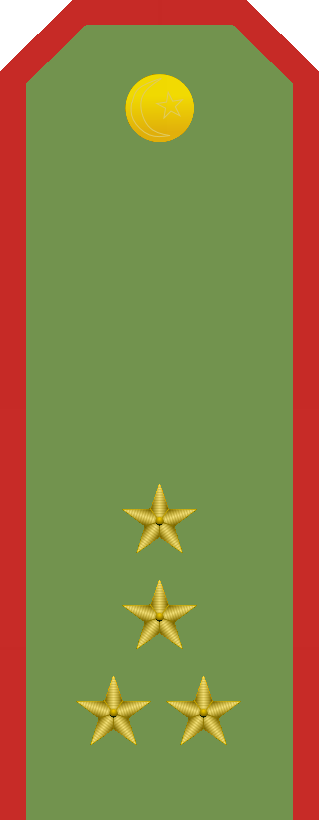
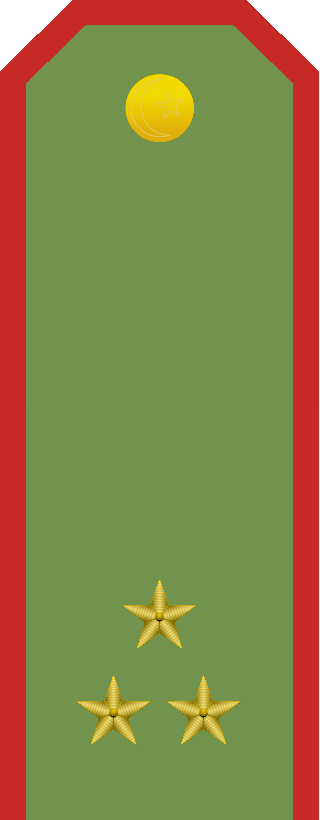
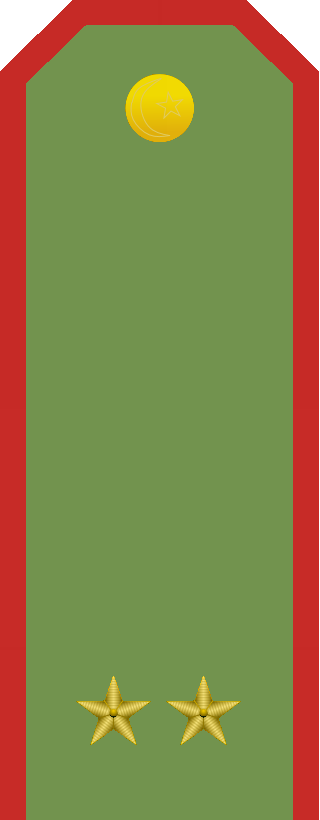
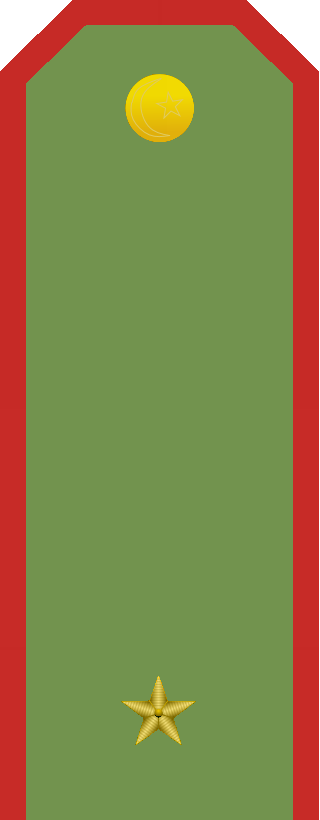
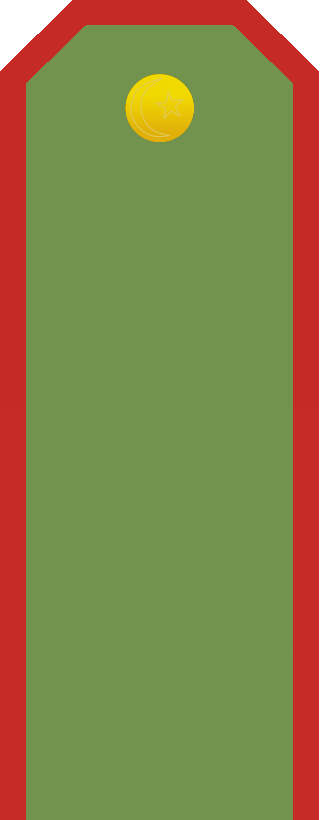
Rank group	Senior NCOs				Junior NCOs	Enlisted
National Army of the Second East Turkestan Republic
National Army of the Second East Turkestan Republic	- -尉	- 上士	- 中士	- 下士	- 等兵	- 列兵
	Master Sergeant	Staff Sergeant	Sergeant	Corporal	Private 1st class	Private
