= Second East Turkestan Republic =

1944–1946 breakaway state in China

East Turkestan Republic شەرقىي تۈركىستان جۇمھۇرىيىتى (Uyghur)
- 1944–1946
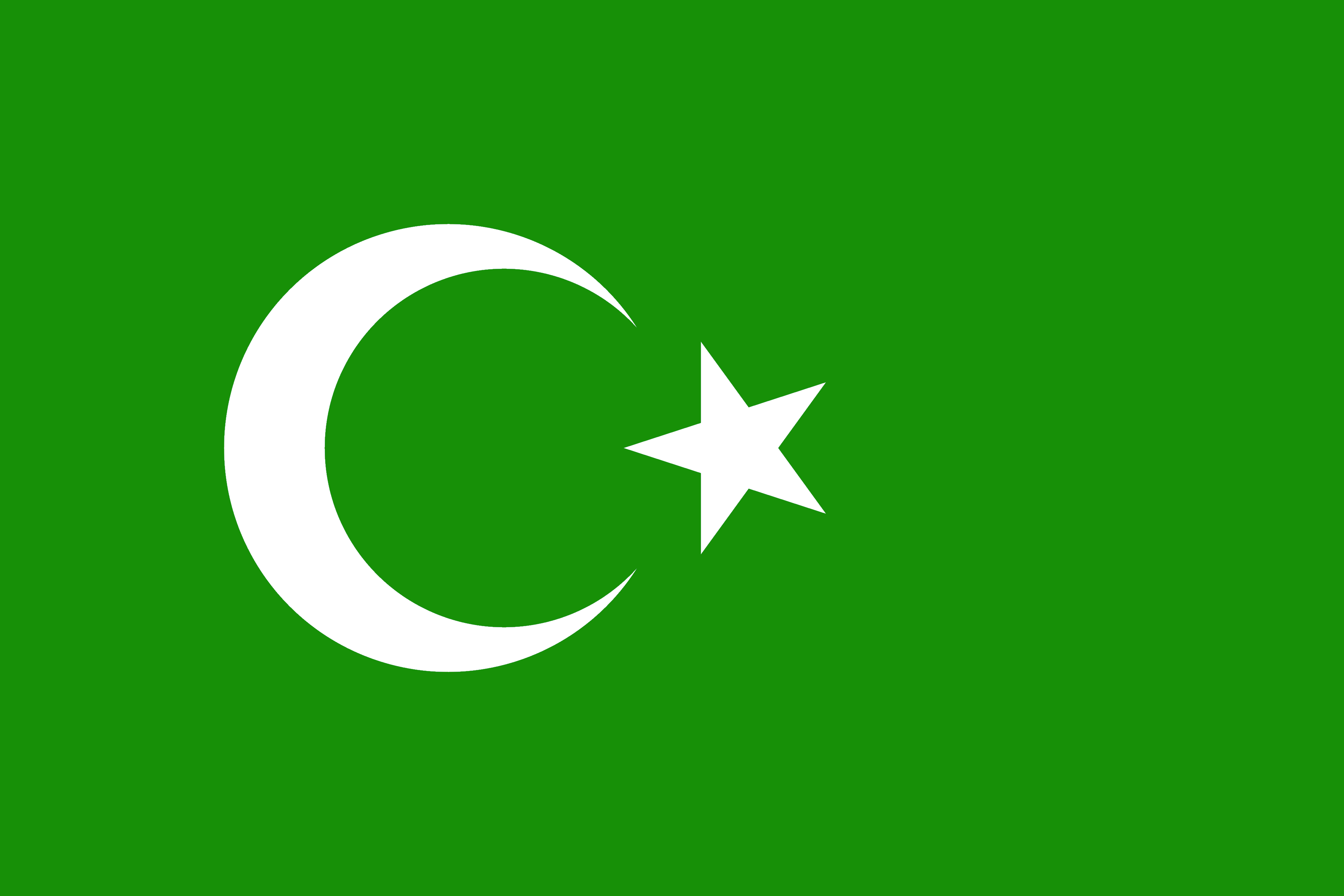
- Flag

- Territorial extent of the Second East Turkestan Republic (green), encompassing the three districts of Ili, Tarbagatay and Altay
- Status: Satellite state of the Soviet Union
- Capital: Ghulja
- Common languages: Uyghur (official, 1944–1945)
- Religion: Islam (majority; official, 1945–1946)
- Government: Unitary republic under an interim government
- President
  - 1944–1946: Elihan Tore
- Vice President
  - 1944–1946: Hakim Beg Khoja

Independence from the Republic of China
- Historical era: World War II · Cold War
  - Start of the Ili Rebellion: 7 November 1944
  - Independence declared: 12 November 1944
  - Formation of the Coalition Government of Xinjiang Province: 27 June 1946

Population
  - 1944 estimate: 705,168
| Preceded by | Succeeded by |
| Xinjiang Province, Republic of China | Ili District Council |
- Today part of: China

East Turkestan Republic

Uyghur name
- Uyghur: شەرقىي تۈركىستان جۇمھۇرىيىتى
Transcriptions
- Latin Yëziqi: Sherqiy Türkistan Jumhuriyiti
- Siril Yëziqi: Шәрқий Түркистан Җумхурийити

Chinese name
- Traditional Chinese: 東突厥斯坦共和國
- Simplified Chinese: 东突厥斯坦共和国
Transcriptions
Standard Mandarin
- Hanyu Pinyin: Dōng Tūjuésītǎn Gònghéguó
- Wade–Giles: Tung^{1} Tʻu^{1}-chüeh^{2}-si^{1}-tʻan^{3} Kung^{4}-he^{2}-kuo^{2}

Russian name
- Russian: Восточно-Туркестанская Республика
- Romanization: Vostochno-Turkestanskaya Respublika

Kazakh name
- Kazakh: Шығыс Түркістан Республикасы

Uzbek name
- Uzbek: Sharqiy Turkiston Jumhuriyati

The East Turkestan Republic (ETR) was a breakaway state that existed from 1944 to 1946, encompassing the three northernmost districts of Xinjiang Province, Republic of China: Ili, Tarbagatay (Tacheng) and Altay. It is often called the Second East Turkestan Republic to differentiate it from the First East Turkestan Republic (1933–1934) established exactly a decade earlier.

The ETR emerged from the Ili Rebellion in November 1944 and was initially backed by the Soviet Union. Over half of the ETR's population was Kazakh, but its government was ethnically diverse with a slight Uyghur majority. Its president was Elihan Tore, an Uzbek, while its vice president was Hakim Beg Khoja, a Uyghur. The Soviets' wartime alliance with the Republic of China (ROC) led to the cessation of aid. In June 1946, following peace negotiations between the leaders of the ETR and representatives from the ROC, the Coalition Government of Xinjiang Province was established in Dihua (present-day Ürümqi) and the ETR government was reformed as the Ili District Council, although the region retained its political independence.

== History ==
=== Background ===
From 1934 to 1941 Xinjiang, a province of the Republic of China, was under the influence of the Soviet Union. The local warlord Sheng Shicai was dependent on the Soviet Union for military support and trade. Soviet troops entered Xinjiang twice, in 1934 and 1937, for limited periods of time to give direct military support to Sheng Shicai's regime. Following Operation Barbarossa, the German invasion of the Soviet Union in June 1941, and the entry of the United States into World War II in December 1941, the Soviet Union became a less attractive patron for Sheng than the Kuomintang. By 1943 Sheng Shicai switched his allegiance to the Kuomintang after major Soviet defeats at the hands of the Germans in World War II, all Soviet Red Army military forces and technicians residing in the province were expelled, and the ROC National Revolutionary Army units and soldiers moved into Xinjiang to take control of the province. In the summer of 1944, following the German defeat on the Eastern Front, Sheng attempted to reassert control over Xinjiang and turned to the Soviet Union for support again. Stalin refused to deal with Sheng and forwarded a confidential letter from Sheng to Chiang Kai-shek. As a result, the Kuomintang removed him from the province in August 1944 and appointed him to a low-level post in the Ministry of Forestry in Chongqing.

=== Rebellion ===
Many of the Turkic peoples of the Ili region of Xinjiang had close cultural, political, and economic ties with Russia and then the Soviet Union. Many of them were educated in the Soviet Union and a community of Russian settlers lived in the region. As a result, many of the Turkic rebels fled to the Soviet Union and obtained Soviet assistance in creating the Sinkiang Turkic People's Liberation Committee (STPNLC) in 1943 to revolt against Kuomintang rule during the Ili Rebellion. The pro-Soviet Uyghur who later became leader of the revolt and the Second East Turkestan Republic, Ehmetjan Qasimi, was Soviet-educated and described as "Stalin's man" and as a "communist-minded progressive". Qasimi Russified his surname to "Kasimov" and became a member of the Communist Party of the Soviet Union.

In 1944, the Soviets took advantage of discontent among the Turkic peoples of the Ili region to support a rebellion against Kuomintang rule in the province in order to reassert Soviet influence in the region. Liu Bin-Di was a Kuomintang (KMT) officer and was sent by officials in Dihua to subdue the Hi area (Ili region) and crush the Turkic Muslims, who were prepared to overthrow Chinese rule. His mission failed because his troops arrived too late. Several Turkic cavalry units armed by the Soviets crossed into China in the direction of Kuldja. In November 1944 Liu was killed by Uyghur and Kazakh rebels backed by the Soviet Union. This started the Ili Rebellion, with the Uyghur Ili rebel army fighting against Republic of China forces.

Following Sheng Shicai's departure from Xinjiang, the new Kuomintang administration had increasing trouble maintaining law and order. On 16 September 1944, troops that had been sent to Gongha county, a majority Kazakh region, were unable to contain a group of rioters. By 3 October, the rioters had captured Nilka, the county seat. On 4 October 1944, Chief of Ghulja (Yining) Police Department Liu Bin-Di sent telegram to Dihua asking for immediate help: "Situation around Nilka 尼勒克镇 is catastrophic, on the battle of October 03 we suffered heavy losses, rebels captured many weapons and spread their actions south of Kash River 喀什河, our troops in Karasu 喀拉苏乡 and other adjacent villages are under siege, local population is joining bandits and increasing their strength, trucks with troops sent from Yining to Nilka delivered many wounded soldiers on return trip. On the head of bandits are Ghani, Fatikh, Akbar, Kurban, Baichurin and others, number of rebels is over 1,500. They are all mounted on horses. City of Yining is in danger, we arrested 200 suspects in the city as a precaution. Additional troops from Urumchi are in immediate necessity." During October, the Three Districts Rebellion broke out south of Ghulja in the Ili, also in Altay and Tarbagatay districts of northern Xinjiang. Aided by the Soviet Union, and supported by several Xinjiang exiles trained in the Soviet Union, the rebels quickly established control over the three districts, capturing Ghulja in November. The ethnic Chinese population of the region was reduced by massacre and expulsion. According to United States consular officials, the Islamic scholar Elihan Töre declared a "Turkestan Islamic Government":

The Turkestan Islamic Government is organized: praise be to Allah for his manifold blessings! Allah be praised! The aid of Allah has given us the heroism to overthrow the government of the oppressor Chinese. But even if we have set ourselves free, can it be pleasing in the sight of our God if we only stand and watch while you, our brethren in religion ... still bear the bloody grievance of subjection to the black politics of the oppressor Government of the savage Chinese? Certainly our God would not be satisfied. We will not throw down our arms until we have made you free from the five bloody fingers of the Chinese oppressors' power, nor until the very roots of the Chinese oppressors' government have dried and died away from the face of the earth of East Turkestan, which we have inherited as our native land from our fathers and our grandfathers.

The rebels assaulted Ghulja on 7 November 1944 and rapidly took over parts of the city, massacring KMT troops, however, the rebels encountered fierce resistance from KMT forces holed up in the power and central police stations and did not take them until 13 November. The creation of the "East Turkestan Republic" (ETR) was declared on 15 November. The Soviet Army assisted the Ili Uyghur army in capturing several towns and airbases. Non-communist Russians like White Russians and Russian settlers who had lived in Xinjiang since the 19th century also helped the Soviet Red Army and the Ili Army rebels. They suffered heavy losses. Many leaders of the East Turkestan Republic were Soviet agents or affiliated with the Soviet Union, like Abdukerim Abbasov, Ishaq Beg, Seypidin Azizi and the White Russians Fotiy Leskin, Ivan Polinov, and Glimkin. When the rebels ran into trouble taking the vital Airambek airfield from the Chinese, Soviet military forces directly intervened to help mortar the Airambek and reduce the Chinese stronghold.

The rebels engaged in massacres of Han Chinese civilians, especially targeting people affiliated with the KMT and Sheng Shicai. In the "Ghulja Declaration" issued on 5 January 1945, the East Turkestan Republic proclaimed that it would "sweep away the Han Chinese", threatening to extract a "blood debt" from the Han. The declaration also declared that the Republic would seek to especially establish cordial ties with the Soviets. The ETR later de-emphasized the anti-Han tone in their official proclamations after they were done massacring most of the Han civilians in their area. The massacres against the Han occurred mostly during 1944–45, with the KMT responding in kind by torturing, killing, and mutilating ETR prisoners. In territory controlled by the ETR like Ghulja, various repressive measures were carried out, like barring Han from owning weapons, operating a Soviet-style secret police, and only making Russian and Turkic languages official and not Chinese. While the non-Muslim Tungusic peoples like the Xibe played a large role in helping the rebels by supplying them with crops, the local Muslim Tungan (Hui) in Ili gave either an insignificant and negligible contribution to the rebels or did not assist them at all.

The demands of the rebels included termination of Chinese rule, equality for all nationalities, recognised use of native languages, friendly relations with the Soviet Union, and opposition to Chinese immigration into Xinjiang. The military forces available to the rebellion were the newly formed East Turkestan National Army, which included mostly Uyghur, Kazakh and White Russian soldiers (around 60,000 troops, armed and trained by the Soviet Union, strengthened with regular Red Army units, that included up to 500 officers and 2,000 soldiers), and a group of Kazakh Karai tribesmen under the command of Osman Batur (around 20,000 horsemen). The Kazakhs expanded to the north, while the INA expanded to the south. By September 1945, the Kuomintang Army and the INA occupied positions on either side of the Manasi River near Dihua. By this time the ETR held Zungaria and Kashgaria, while the Kuomintang held the Dihua area.

The East Turkestan National Army, which was established on 8 April 1945 as the military arm of the ETR, was led by the Kyrgyz Ishaq Beg and the White Russians Polinov and Leskin, and all three were pro-Soviet and had a history of military service with Soviet-associated forces. The Soviets supplied the INA with ammunition and Russian-style uniforms, and Soviet troops directly helped the INA troops fight against the Chinese forces. The INA uniforms and flags all had insignia with the Russian acronym for "East Turkestan Republic", VTR in Cyrillic (Vostochnaya Turkestanskaya Respublika). Thousands of Soviet troops assisted Turkic rebels in fighting the Chinese army. In October 1945 suspected Soviet planes attacked Chinese positions.

As the Soviet Red Army and Uyghur Ili Army advanced with Soviet air support against poorly prepared Chinese forces, they almost reached Dihua; however, the Chinese military created rings of defences around the area, sending Chinese Muslim cavalry to halt the advance of the Turkic Muslim rebels. Thousands of Chinese Muslim troops under General Ma Bufang and his nephew General Ma Chengxiang poured into Xinjiang from Qinghai to combat the Soviet and Turkic Uyghur forces.

Much of the Ili army and equipment originated from the Soviet Union. The Ili rebel army pushed the Chinese forces across the plains and reached Kashgar, Kaghlik and Yarkand. However, the Uyghurs in the oases gave no support to the Soviet-backed rebels and, as a result, the Chinese army was able to expel them. The Ili rebels then butchered livestock belonging to Kyrgyz and Tajiks of Xinjiang. The Soviet-backed insurgents destroyed Tajik and Kyrgyz crops and moved aggressively against the Tajiks and Kyrgyz of China. The Chinese beat back the Soviet-supported rebellion in Sarikol from August 1945 – 1946, defeating the siege of the "tribesman" around Yarkand when they had rebelled in Nanchiang around Sarikol, and killing Red Army officers.

The Ma Clique warlord of Qinghai, Ma Bufang, was sent with his Muslim cavalry to Dihua by the Kuomintang in 1945 to protect it from the Uyghur rebels from Ili. In 1945, the Tungan (Hui) 5th and 42nd Cavalry were sent from Qinghai to Xinjiang where they reinforced the KMT Second Army, composed of four divisions. Their combined forces made for 100,000 Hui and Han troops serving under KMT command in 1945. It was reported the Soviets were eager to "liquidate" Ma Bufang. General Ma Chengxiang, another Hui Ma Clique officer and nephew of Ma Bufang, commanded the First Cavalry Division in Xinjiang under the KMT, which was formerly the Gansu Fifth Cavalry Army.

=== Formation of the Coalition Government of Xinjiang Province and dissolution of the ETR ===
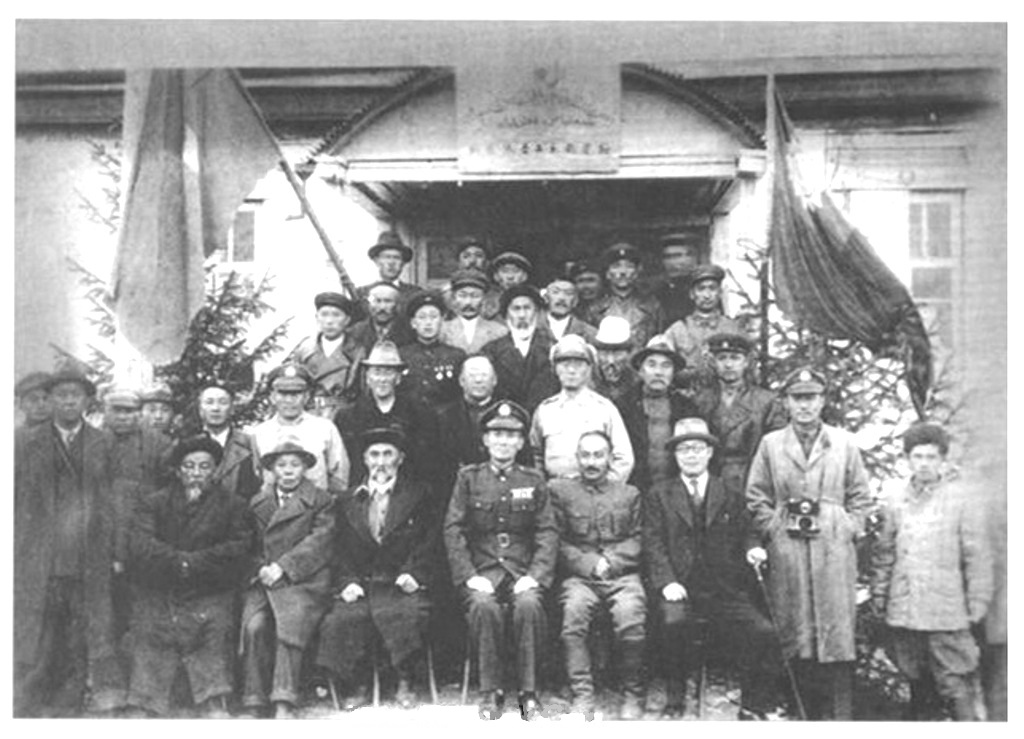
Representatives of the Coalition Government of Xinjiang Province

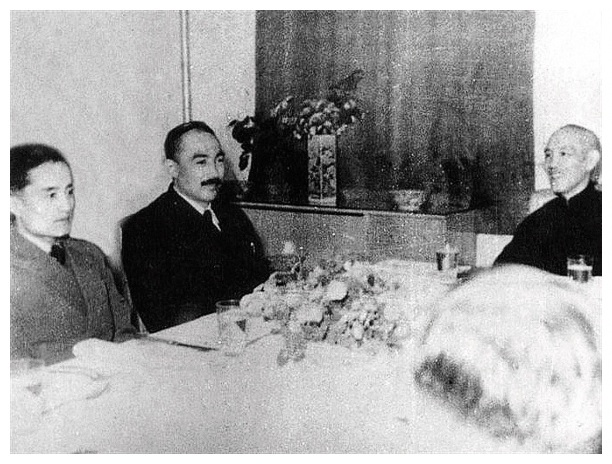
Ehmetjan Qasimi and Abdukerim Abbasov with Chiang Kai-shek in Nanjing on 22 November 1946

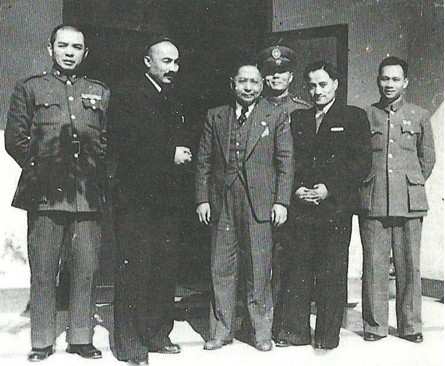
Qasimi and Abbasov with Sun Fo, the son of Sun Yat-sen, in Nanjing on 24 November 1946

In August 1945, China signed a Treaty of Friendship and Alliance granting the Soviet Union a range of concessions that the United States promised at the Yalta Conference. This ended overt Soviet support for the East Turkestan Republic. The Kuomintang's central government of China reached a negotiated settlement with the leaders of the ETR in June 1946. On 27 June 1946, the Interim Government of the ETR passed Resolution 324 to transform the Interim Government of the ETR into the Ili District Council of Xinjiang Province and dissolve the ETR (the resolution used 'East Turkestan' to denote Xinjiang Province). The new council was not a government, and the Three Districts were respectively and directly led by the newly founded Coalition Government of Xinjiang Province along with the other seven districts in Xinjiang.

On 1 July 1946, the Coalition Government of Xinjiang Province was established in Dihua. This government was constituted by three sides: the central government of China, the Three Districts, and the Uyghur-inhabited, anti-revolutionary Seven Districts (at the time, Xinjiang Province was divided into ten districts, and the Seven Districts were treated as a unit in the Coalition Government). In the 25 members of the Committee of the Coalition Government, there were seven from the central government, eight from the Three Districts, and ten from the Seven Districts. The communist Ehmetjan Qasimi, the leader of the Three Districts, became the Provincial Vice Chairman.

== Local opposition ==
The Kuomintang's CC Clique employed countermeasures in Xinjiang to prevent the conservative, traditionalist religious Uyghurs in the oases in southern Xinjiang from defecting to the pro-Soviet, pro-Russian ETR Uyghurs in Ili in northern Xinjiang. The KMT allowed three anti-Soviet, pan-Turkic nationalist Uyghurs, Masud Sabri, Muhammad Amin Bughra and Isa Yusuf Alptekin to write and publish pan-Turkic nationalist propaganda in order to incite the Turkic peoples against the Soviets, angering them. Anti-Soviet sentiment was espoused by Isa while pro-Soviet sentiment was espoused by Burhan. In 1949, according to Abdurahim Amin, violence broke out at Xinjiang College in Dihua between supporters of the Soviets and supporters of Turkey following the screening of a film on the Russo-Turkish wars.

American telegrams reported that the Soviet secret police threatened to assassinate Muslim leaders from Ining and put pressure on them to flee to "inner China" via Dihua, White Russians grew fearful of Muslim mobs as they chanted, "We freed ourselves from the yellow men, now we must destroy the white."

The pan-Turkist 3 Effendis (Üch Äpändi), Aisa Alptekin, Memtimin Bughra and Masud Sabri were anti-Soviet Uyghur leaders. The Second East Turkestan Republic attacked them as Kuomintang "puppets". Uyghur linguist Ibrahim Muti'i opposed the Second East Turkestan Republic and the Ili Rebellion because it was backed by the Soviets and Stalin. The former ETR leader Seypidin Azizi later apologized to Ibrahim and admitted that his opposition to the East Turkestan Republic was the correct thing to do.

== Government ==
Interim Government Council of the East Turkestan Republic
| Name | Ethnicity | Position(s) |
|---|---|---|
| Elihan Tore | Uzbek | President of the Interim Government |
| Hakim Beg Khoja | Uyghur | Vice President of the Interim Government |
| Abdukerim Abbasov | Uyghur | Minister of Internal Affairs (initially); Minister of Propaganda; Political Commissar of the ETNA |
| Mahmautjan Mahsum | Uyghur | Chief Justice of the Supreme Court |
| Jani Yoldaxup | Uyghur | Director of the Supervisory Committee |
| Rahimjan Sabir Ghaji | Uyghur | Vice Minister of Military Affairs (initially); Minister of Military Affairs; Minister of Internal Affairs |
| Salam Bay | Uzbek | Minister of Agriculture |
| Zunun Taipov | Tatar | Assistant Director of the Supervisory Committee (initially); Minister of Military Affairs; Deputy Commander of the ETNA |
| Anwar Musabay | Uyghur | Minister of Finance |
| Abulimiti Ali Halipa | Uyghur | Minister of Religious Affairs |
| Abdulla Heni | Uyghur | Chief Judge of Military Tribunals |
| Habib Yunich | Tatar | Minister of Education |
| Ubulhari Tora | Kazakh | Minister of Nomadic Pasturing |
| Piotr Alexandrov | Russian | Commander-in-Chief of the ETNA; Minister of Military Affairs |
| Povel Maskolyov | Russian | Minister of Internal Affairs (initially); Chief of Staff of the ETNA |
| Puja Abal | Mongol | Representative of the Mongol community |
| Ehmetjan Qasimi | Uyghur | Minister of Internal Affairs |
| Seypidin Azizi | Uyghur | Minister of Education |
Sources: Wang 2020, pp. 150–151; Forbes 1986, p. 259.

== Military ==
The National Army of the Second East Turkestan Republic was formed on 8 April 1945, and originally consisted of six regiments. General conscription of all races, except the Chinese, into the National Army was enforced in Ili District. Over 60,000 soldiers were in the Ili army according to General Sung.

Later, Sibo and Mongol battalions were upgraded to regiments. When Kazakh irregulars under Osman Batur defected to the Kuomintang in 1947, the Kazakh cavalry regiment of National Army also defected to Osman Batur. The motorized part of Army consisted of an Artillery Division, which included twelve cannons, two armoured vehicles, and two tanks. National aviation forces included forty-two airplanes, captured at a Kuomintang air base in Ghulja on 31 January 1945; all of them were damaged during the battle for the base. Some of these aircraft were repaired and put into service by Soviet military personnel in ETR. These airplanes participated in the battle between Ili rebels and the Kuomintang for Shihezi and Jinghe in September 1945.

This battle resulted in the capture of both KMT bases and oil fields in Dushanzi. During the battle, one more Kuomintang airplane was captured, detachments of National Army reached Manasi River north of Dihua, which caused panic in the city. Government offices were evacuated to Kumul. An offensive on Xinjiang's capital was cancelled due to direct pressure from Moscow on Ili rebels' leadership, which agreed to follow orders from Moscow to begin peace talks with Kuomintang. Moscow ordered the National Army to cease fire on all frontiers. First peace talks between Ili rebels and Kuomintang followed Chiang Kai-shek's speech on China State Radio, offering "to peacefully resolve Xinjiang crisis" with the rebels. These peace talks were mediated by the Soviet Union and started in Dihua on 14 October 1945.

The National Army enlisted 25,000 to 30,000 troops. In accordance with the peace agreement with Chiang Kai-shek signed on 6 June 1946, this number was reduced to 11,000 to 12,000 troops and restricted to stations in only the Three Districts (Ili, Tarbagatay and Altay) of northern Xinjiang. National Army detachments were also withdrawn from Southern Xinjiang, leaving the strategic city of Aksu and opening the road from Dihua to the Kashgar region. This obvious mistake of Ili rebels allowed the Kuomintang to deploy 70,000 troops from 1946 to 1947 into Southern Xinjiang and quell the rebellion in the Pamir Mountains.

This rebellion had broken on 19 August 1945, in the Sariqol area of Taghdumbash Pamir. Rebels led by the Uyghur Sadiq Khan Khoja from Kargilik and the Sariqoli Tajik Karavan Shah captured all the border posts near the Afghan, Soviet and Indian borders (Su-Bashi, Daftar, Mintaka Qarawul, Bulunqul), and a Tashkurgan fortress, killing Kuomintang troops. The rebels took Kuomintang troops by surprise as they celebrated the capitulation of Japanese Army in Manchuria. A few Kuomintang forces in Sariqol survived and fled to India during the rebel attack. The original base of the rebellion was situated on the mountainous Pamir village of Tagarma, near the Soviet border. On 15 September 1945, Tashkurgan rebels took Igiz-Yar fortress on the road to Yangihissar, while another group of rebels simultaneously took Oitagh, Bostan-Terek and Tashmalik on the road to Kashgar.

By the end of 1945, Tashkurgan rebels had attacked Kashgar and Yarkand districts. On 2 January 1946, while the Preliminary Peace Agreement was signed in Dihua between Ili rebels and Kuomintang representatives under Soviet mediation, rebels took Guma, Kargilik and Poskam, important towns controlling communications between Xinjiang, Tibet and India. On 11 January 1946, the Kuomintang Army counter-attacked the Yarkand military zone, bringing reinforcements from Aksu Region. The counter-attackers repelled Tashkurgan rebels from the outskirts of Yarkand, recaptured the towns of Poskam, Kargilik and Guma and brought the Tashkurgan Region back under Chinese control by the summer of 1946.

Only a few hundred of the originally 7,000 Tashkurgan rebel force survived. The survivors retreated to the mountainous Pamir base in Qosrap (village in present-day Akto County). The National Army was inactive in Kashgar and Aksu from 1946 to 1949 until the arrival of People's Liberation Army (PLA) units in Xinjiang.

Deng Liqun, a special envoy of Mao Zedong, arrived at Ghulja on 17 August 1949 to negotiate with the Three Districts leadership about the districts' future. Deng sent a secret telegram to Mao about the Three Districts forces the following day. He listed these forces as including about 14,000 troops, armed mostly with German weapons, heavy artillery, 120 military trucks and artillery-towing vehicles, and around 6,000 cavalry horses. Soviet military personnel were present in the Army and serviced fourteen airplanes, which were used as bombers. On 20 December 1949, the National Army was incorporated into the PLA as its Xinjiang 5th Army Corps.

== Economy ==
The ETR government's 1946 national budget indicated that its largest source of revenue was trade with the Soviet Union. The largest export was oil from the Maytag oil fields; livestock and other goods were also exported by locals. The ETR had exorbitant military expenditures and incurred massive debts to the Soviet Union. As the region had not yet industrialised, the authorities turned to confiscating Han Chinese property, imposing heavy taxes, issuing deficit bonds and paper currency, collecting donations, and levying fines for unpaid and forced labour as sources of income. The ETR government justified its expropriation of Han Chinese property by issuing a resolution (its ninth) which argued that the Han Chinese had stolen the wealth of the indigenous populace through the "tyranny of the Han Chinese government".

== Demographics ==
Ethnic breakdown of the ETR (1944)
| Ethnicity | Percentage |
| Kazakhs | 52.1% |
| Uyghurs | 25.3% |
| Others | 22.6% |
Source: Wang 2020, p. 265.

The ETR had a total population of 705,168 people at the end of 1944. Kazakhs made up 52.1% of the population, or 367,204 people, while Uyghurs made up 25.3% of the population, or 178,527 people. Altay District had the highest percentage of Kazakhs at 84.6%, while Ili District had the highest percentage of Uyghurs at 35.1% (although Kazakhs still made up a plurality of Ili's population at 44.7%).

== Press ==
The official newspaper of the ETR government was Azat Sherkiy Turkistan (Free East Turkestan), later renamed Inqlawiy Sherkiy Turkistan (Revolutionary East Turkestan). It was published in four languages – Uyghur, Russian, Kazakh, and Chinese – and began circulation on 17 November 1944, five days after the ETR was founded. The Tatar polyglot Habib Yunich was its editor.

== Flag ==
The flag of the Second East Turkestan Republic was a green field charged with a star and crescent. According to former ETR education minister Seypidin Azizi, the star and crescent were white.

== Legacy ==
The Soviet Union set up similar puppet-states in Pahlavi-dynasty Iran in the form of the Azerbaijan People's Government and Republic of Mahabad. The Soviet Union used comparable methods and tactics in both Xinjiang and Iran upon establishing the Kurdish Republic of Mahabad and Autonomous Republic of Azerbaijan. The American ambassador to the Soviet Union sent a telegram to Washington DC noting the similarity of the situations in Iranian Azerbaijan and in Xinjiang.

After the Sino-Soviet split, the Soviet Union supported Uyghur nationalist propaganda and Uyghur separatist movements against China. Soviet historians claimed that the Uyghur native land was Xinjiang and Uyghur nationalism was promoted by Soviet versions of Turcological history. The Communist Party of the Soviet Union supported the publication of works which glorified the Second East Turkestan Republic and the Ili Rebellion against China in its anti-China propaganda war.

According to her autobiography, Dragon Fighter: One Woman's Epic Struggle for Peace with China, Rebiya Kadeer's father served with pro-Soviet Uyghur rebels under the Second East Turkestan Republic in the Ili Rebellion (Three Districts Revolution) in 1944–1946, using Soviet assistance and aid to fight the Republic of China government under Chiang Kai-shek. Kadeer and her family were close friends with White Russian exiles living in Xinjiang and Kadeer recalled that many Uyghurs thought Russian culture was "more advanced" than that of the Uyghurs and they "respected" the Russians a lot.

In a 2021 documentary by the Chinese state–run CGTN news channel, a photograph of Ehmetjan Qasimi wearing an ETR medal in a school textbook was cited as an example of Uyghur educators inserting separatist propaganda in educational materials. Australian historian of modern Chinese history David Brophy notes that this was despite Ehmetjan having "enjoyed relative protection as a historical figure" due to his leadership in the Three Districts Revolution, and the same photo having been used by Ehmetjan's late wife in her memoirs, albeit cropped above the medal.

== See also ==
- East Turkistan Government in Exile
