= Xinjiang =

Autonomous region of China

Xinjiang Sinkiang
- Autonomous region
- Xinjiang Uygur Autonomous Region

Name transcription(s)
  - Chinese: 新疆维吾尔自治区 (Xīnjiāng Wéiwú'ěr Zìzhìqū)
  - Uyghur: شىنجاڭ ئۇيغۇر ئاپتونوم رايونى (Shinjang Uyghur Aptonom Rayoni)
  - Abbreviation: XJ / 新 (Xīn)
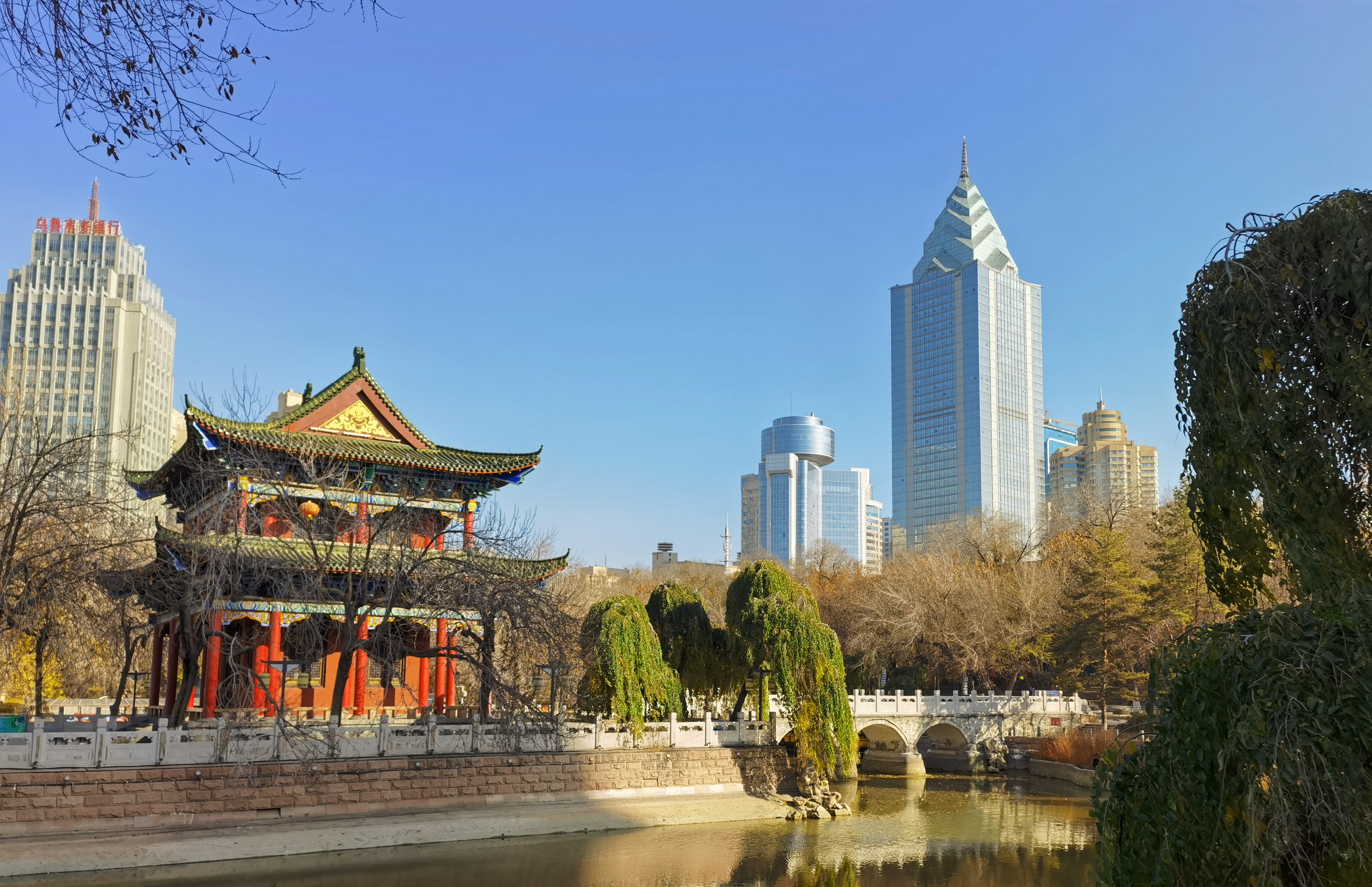
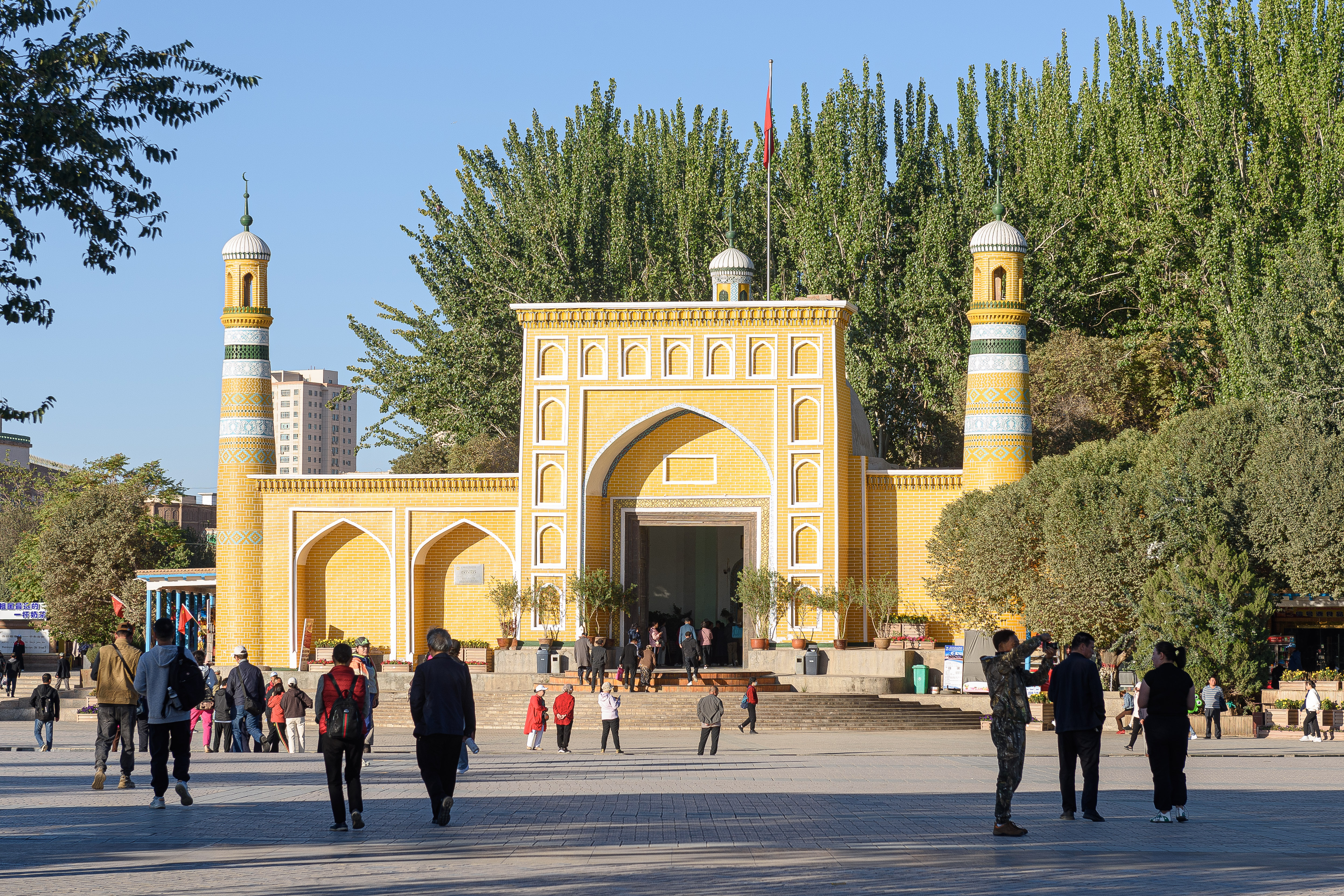
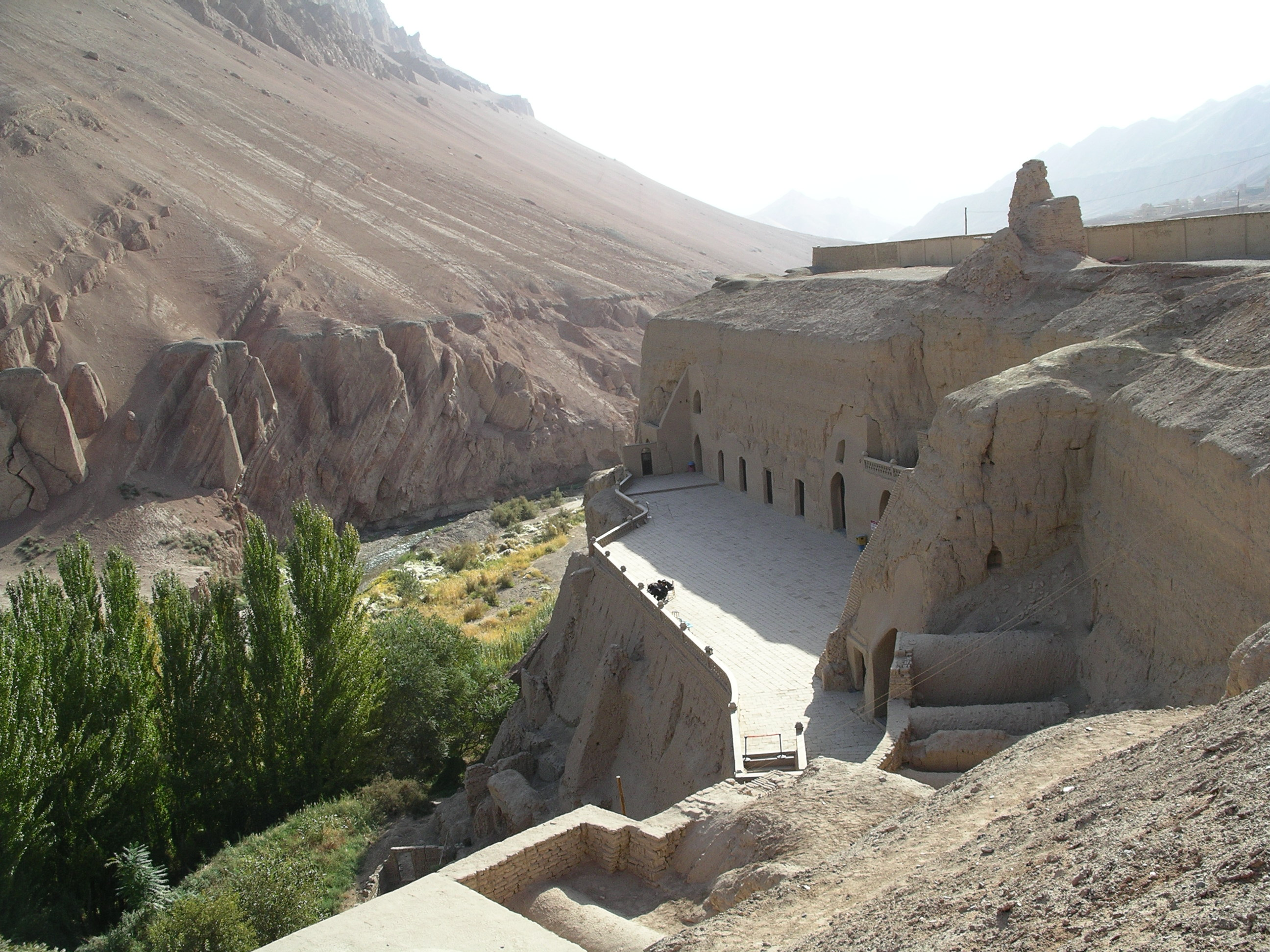
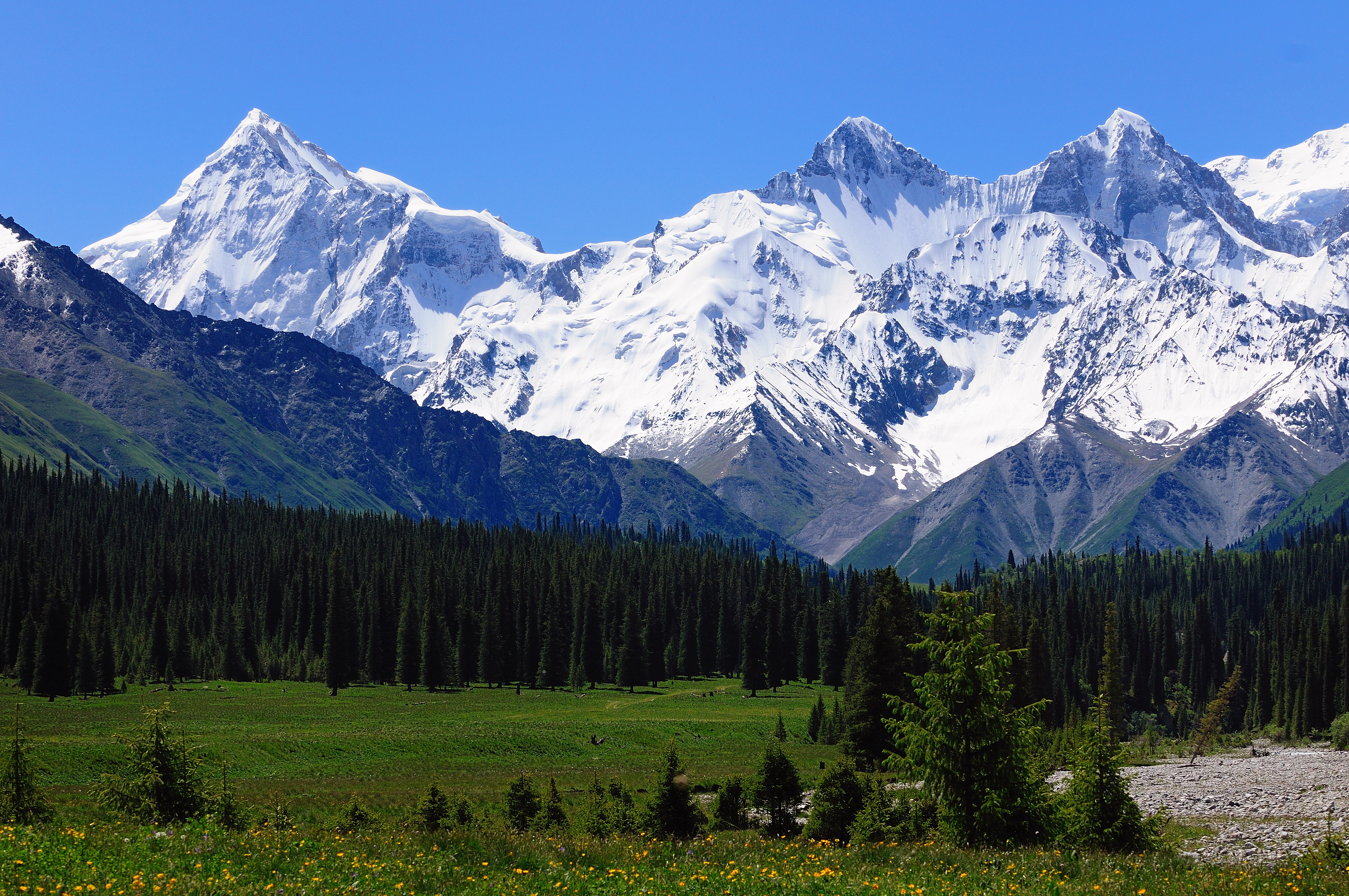
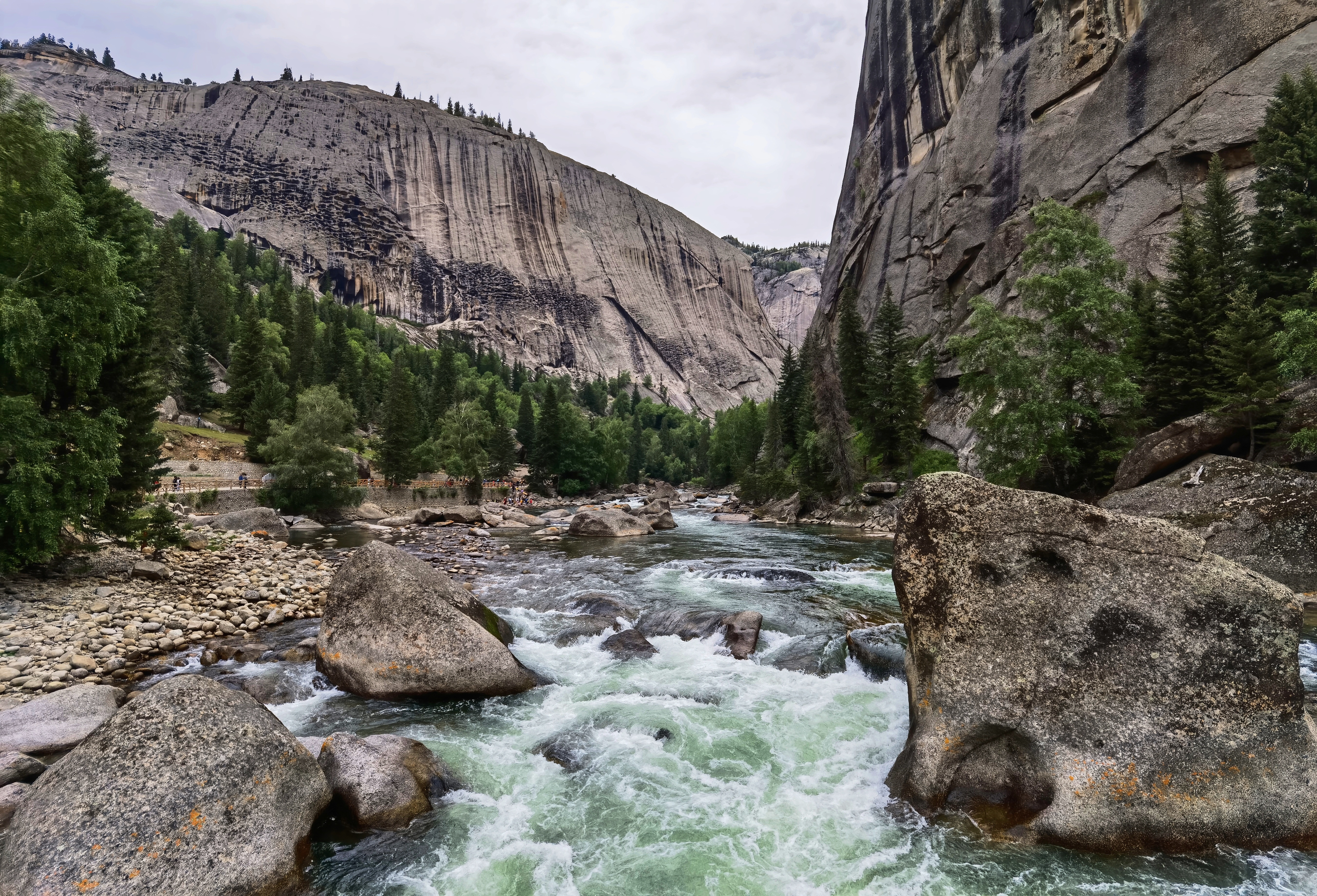
- Ürümqi Id Kah Mosque Bezeklik Thousand Buddha Caves Muzart Pass Irtysh River

- Location of Xinjiang within China
- Coordinates: 41°N 85°E
- Country: China
- Capital and largest city: Ürümqi
- Divisions – Prefecture-level – County-level – Township-level: 14 prefectures 95 counties 1142 towns and subdistricts

Government
  - Type: Autonomous region
  - Body: Xinjiang Uygur Autonomous Regional People's Congress
  - Party Secretary: Chen Xiaojiang
  - Congress Chairwoman: Zumret Obul
  - Government Chairman: Erkin Tuniyaz
  - Regional CPPCC Chairman: Nurlan Abilmazhinuly
  - National People's Congress Representation: 60 deputies

Area
  - Total: 1,664,897 km^{2} (642,820 sq mi)
  - Rank: 1st
- Highest elevation (Mount K2): 8,611 m (28,251 ft)
- Lowest elevation (Aydingkol): −154 m (−505 ft)

Population (2021)
  - Total: 25,890,000
  - Rank: 21st
  - Density: 15.55/km^{2} (40.28/sq mi)
  - Rank: 29th

Demographics
  - Ethnic composition (2020 census): 44.96% Uyghur; 42.24% Han; 12.80% other
  - Languages: Two linguae francae, Chinese and Uyghur

GDP (2025)
  - Total: CN¥ 2,146 billion (23rd); US$ 300 billion
  - Per capita: CN¥ 81,577 (15th); US$ 11,421
- Time zone: UTC+6 / UTC+8
- ISO 3166 code: CN-XJ
- HDI (2023): 0.771 (22nd) – high
- Website: www.xinjiang.gov.cn (in Chinese); Uyghur version

Xinjiang, (Note: UK: /ˌʃɪndʒiːˈæŋ/, US: /ˈʃɪnˈdʒjɑːŋ/; Chinese: 新疆; pinyin: Xīnjiāng; Uyghur: شىنجاڭ, SASM/GNC: Xinjang; previously romanized as Sinkiang) officially the Xinjiang Uygur Autonomous Region (XUAR), (Note: Uygur is an alternative English spelling of Uyghur and the spelling used by the Chinese government.) is an autonomous region of the People's Republic of China (PRC), in the northwest of the country at the crossroads of Central Asia and East Asia. The largest province-level division of China by area and the 8th-largest country subdivision in the world, Xinjiang spans over 1.6 million square kilometers (620,000 sq mi) and has about 25 million inhabitants. Xinjiang borders the countries of Afghanistan, India, Kazakhstan, Kyrgyzstan, Mongolia, Pakistan, Russia, and Tajikistan. The rugged Karakoram, Kunlun, and Tian Shan mountain ranges occupy much of Xinjiang's borders, as well as its western and southern regions. The Aksai Chin and Trans-Karakoram Tract regions are claimed by India but administered by China. Xinjiang also borders the Tibet Autonomous Region and the provinces of Gansu and Qinghai. The best-known route of the historic Silk Road ran through the territory from the east to its northwestern border.

High mountain ranges divide Xinjiang into the Dzungarian Basin (Dzungaria) in the north and the Tarim Basin in the south. Only about 9.7% of Xinjiang's land area is fit for human habitation. It is home to a number of ethnic groups, including the Uyghurs, Han Chinese, Hui, Kazakhs, Kyrgyz, Mongols, Russians, Sibe, Tajiks (Pamiris), and Tibetans. There are more than a dozen autonomous prefectures and counties for minorities in Xinjiang. Many older English-language reference works call the area Chinese Turkestan, Chinese Turkistan, East Turkestan or East Turkistan.

With a documented history of at least 2,500 years, a succession of people and empires have vied for control over all or parts of this territory. In the 18th century it came under the rule of the Qing dynasty, which was later replaced by the Republic of China. Since 1949 and the Chinese Civil War, it has been part of the People's Republic of China. In 1954, the Chinese Communist Party (CCP) established the Xinjiang Production and Construction Corps (XPCC) to strengthen border defense against the Soviet Union and promote the local economy by settling soldiers into the region. In 1955, Xinjiang was administratively changed from a province into an autonomous region. In recent decades, abundant oil and mineral reserves have been found in Xinjiang and it has become China's largest natural-gas-producing region. In the 2020s, Xinjiang emerged as a major domestic tourist destination within China.

From the 1990s to the 2010s, the East Turkestan independence movement, separatist conflict and the influence of radical Islam have resulted in unrest in the region with occasional terrorist attacks and clashes between separatist and government forces. These conflicts prompted the Chinese government to commit a series of ongoing human rights abuses against Uyghurs and other ethnic and religious minorities in the region including, according to some, genocide.

== Names ==
Xinjiang
- "Xīnjiāng" in Chinese characters

Chinese name
- Chinese: 新疆
- Hanyu Pinyin: Xīnjiāng
- Postal: Sinkiang
- Literal meaning: "New Frontier"
Transcriptions
Standard Mandarin
- Hanyu Pinyin: Xīnjiāng
- Bopomofo: ㄒㄧㄣ ㄐㄧㄤ
- Gwoyeu Romatzyh: Shinjiang
- Wade–Giles: Hsin^{1}-chiang^{1}
- Tongyong Pinyin: Sinjiang
- Yale Romanization: Syīnjyāng
- MPS2: Shinjiang
- IPA: [ɕín.tɕjáŋ]
other Mandarin
- Xiao'erjing: ثٍ‌ڭِیَانْ
- Dungan: Щинҗён
Hakka
- Romanization: Sîn-kiông
Yue: Cantonese
- Yale Romanization: Sān'gēung
- Jyutping: san1 goeng1
- IPA: [sɐn˥ kœŋ˥]
Southern Min
- Hokkien POJ: Sin-kiong
- Teochew Peng'im: Sing-kiang
Eastern Min
- Fuzhou BUC: Sĭng-giŏng

Xinjiang Uygur Autonomous Region
- Simplified Chinese: 新疆维吾尔自治区
- Traditional Chinese: 新疆維吾爾自治區
- Hanyu Pinyin: Xīnjiāng Wéiwú'ěr Zìzhìqū
Transcriptions
Standard Mandarin
- Hanyu Pinyin: Xīnjiāng Wéiwú'ěr Zìzhìqū
- Bopomofo: ㄒㄧㄣ ㄐㄧㄤ; ㄨㄟˊ ㄨˊ ㄦˇ; ㄗˋ ㄓˋ ㄑㄩ
- Gwoyeu Romatzyh: Shinjiang Weiwueel Tzyhjyhchiu
- Wade–Giles: Hsin^{1}-chiang^{1} Wei^{2}-wu^{2}-erh^{3} Tzu^{4}-chih^{4}-chʻü^{1}
- Tongyong Pinyin: Sinjiang Wéiwú'ěr Zìhjhìhcyu
- Yale Romanization: Syīnjyāng Wéiwúěr Dz̀jr̀chyū
- MPS2: Shinjiang Wheihuel Tzyhgukhickhu
- IPA: [ɕín.tɕjáŋ wěɪ.ǔ.àɚ tsɹ̩̂.ʈʂɻ̩̂.tɕʰý]
other Mandarin
- Xiao'erjing: ثٍ‌ڭِیَانْ وِوُعَر زِجِ‌کِیُوِ
- Dungan: Щинҗён Уйгур Зыҗычү
Wu
- Romanization: sin cian vi ng el zy zy chiu
Hakka
- Romanization: Sîn-kiông Vì-ngâ-ngì Tshṳ-tshṳ-khî
Southern Min
- Hokkien POJ: Sin-kiong Ûi-ngô͘-ní Chū-tī-khu
- Teochew Peng'im: Sing-kiang Jûi-û-jéu Tsĕu-tī-khu
Eastern Min
- Fuzhou BUC: Sĭng-giŏng Mì-ngù-ī Cê̤ṳ-dê-kṳ̆

Mongolian name
- Mongolian Cyrillic: Шиньжян Уйгурын өөртөө засах орон
- Mongolian script: ᠰᠢᠨᠵᠢᠶᠠᠩ ᠤᠶᠢᠭᠤᠷ ᠤᠨ ᠥᠪᠡᠷᠲᠡᠭᠡᠨ ᠵᠠᠰᠠᠬᠤ ᠣᠷᠤᠨ
Transcriptions
- SASM/GNC: Sinjiyaŋ Uyiɣur-un öbertegen jasaqu orun (Classical); Shin'jyan Uiguryn öörtöö zasakh oron (Khalkha)

Uyghur name
- Uyghur: شىنجاڭ ئۇيغۇر ئاپتونوم رايونى
Transcriptions
- Latin Yëziqi: Shinjang Uyghur Aptonom Rayoni
- Yengi Yeziⱪ: Xinjang Uyƣur Aptonom Rayoni
- SASM/GNC: Xinjang Uyĝur Aptonom Rayoni
- Siril Yëziqi: Шинҗаң Уйғур Аптоном Райони

Manchu name
- Manchu script: ᡳᠴᡝ ᠵᡝᠴᡝᠨ ᡠᡳᡤᡠᡵ ᠪᡝᠶᡝ ᡩᠠᠰᠠᠩᡤᠠ ᡤᠣᠯᠣ
- Möllendorff: Ice Jecen Uigur beye dasangga golo

Kazakh name
- Kazakh: شينجياڭ ۇيعۇر اۆتونوميالىق ئاۋدانى; Шыңжаң Ұйғыр автономиялық ауданы Shyńjań Uıǵyr aýtonomııalyq aýdany

Kyrgyz name
- Kyrgyz: شئنجاڭ ۇيعۇر اپتونوم رايونۇ; Шинжаң-Уйгур автоном району Şincañ-Uyğur avtonom rayonu

Oirat name
- Oirat: ᠱᡅᠨᡓᡅᡕᠠᡊ ᡇᡕᡅᡎᡇᠷ ᡅᠨ ᡄᡋᡄᠷᡄᡃᠨ ᠴᠠᠰᠠᡍᡇ ᡆᠷᡇᠨ; Šinǰiyang Uyiγur-in ebereen zasaqu orun

Xibe name
- Xibe: ᠰᡞᠨᡪᠶᠠᡢ ᡠᡞᡤᡠᠷ ᠪᡝᠶᡝ ᡩᠠᠰᠠᡢᡤᠠ ᡤᠣᠯᠣ; Sinjyang Uigur beye dasangga golo

Sarikoli name
- Sarikoli: شىنجاڭ ئۈيغۈر ئافتۇنۇم رەيۇن; Xinjong Üighür Oftunum Rayun (Note: There is no official orthography for Sarikoli in China. This is the spelling used in the Sarikoli-Chinese dictionary written by linguist Gao Erqiang.)

The general region of Xinjiang has been known by many different names, including Altishahr—the historical Uyghur name for the southern half of the region referring to "the six cities" of the Tarim Basin—Khotan, Khotay, Chinese Tartary, High Tartary, East Chagatay (it was the eastern part of the Chagatai Khanate), Moghulistan ("land of the Mongols"), Kashgaria, Little Bokhara, Serindia (due to Indian cultural influence) and, in Chinese, Xiyu (西域), meaning "Western Regions".

Between the 2nd century BC and 2nd century AD, the Han Empire established the Protectorate of the Western Regions or Xiyu Protectorate (西域都護府) in an effort to secure the profitable routes of the Silk Road. The Western Regions during the Tang era were known as Qixi (磧西). Qi refers to the Gobi Desert and Xi refers to the west. The Tang Empire established the Protectorate General to Pacify the West or Anxi Protectorate (安西都護府) in 640 to control the region.

During the Qing dynasty, the northern part of Xinjiang, Dzungaria, was known as Zhunbu (準部, "Dzungar region") and the Southern Tarim Basin as Huijiang (回疆, "Muslim Frontier"). Both regions merged after the Qing dynasty suppressed the Revolt of the Altishahr Khojas in 1759, becoming "Xiyu Xinjiang" (西域新疆, literally "Western Regions' New Frontier"), later simplified as "Xinjiang" (新疆; formerly romanized as "Sinkiang"). The official name was given during the reign of the Guangxu Emperor in 1878. It can be translated as "new frontier" or "new territory". In fact, the term "Xinjiang" was used in many other places conquered but never ruled by Chinese empires directly until the gradual Gaitu Guiliu administrative reform, including regions in Southern China. For instance, present-day Jinchuan County in Sichuan was then known as "Jinchuan Xinjiang", Zhaotong in Yunnan was named "Xinjiang", Qiandongnan region, Anshun and Zhenning were named "Liangyou Xinjiang", etc.

In 1955, the status of Xinjiang was changed from a province to a "Uygur Autonomous Region". The name originally proposed was simply "Xinjiang Autonomous Region" because that was the name of the imperial territory. This proposal was not well received by Uyghurs in the Communist Party, who found the name colonialist since it meant "new territory". Seypidin Azizi, the first chairman of Xinjiang, expressed his strong objection to the proposed name to Mao Zedong, arguing that "autonomy is not given to mountains and rivers. It is given to particular nationalities." Some Uyghur Communists proposed the name "Tian Shan Uyghur Autonomous Region" instead. The Han Communists in the central government denied the name Xinjiang was colonialist or that the central government could be colonialist, both because they were communists and because China was a victim of colonialism. But due to the Uyghur complaints, the administrative region was named "Xinjiang Uygur Autonomous Region".

== Description ==
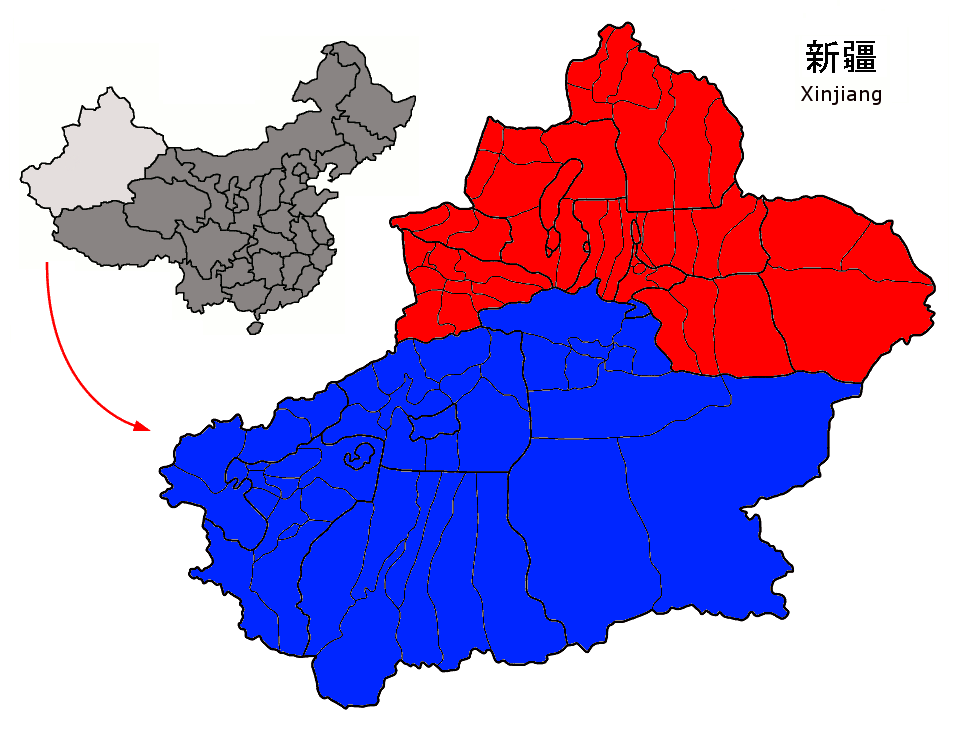
Dzungaria (red) and the Tarim Basin / Altishahr (blue)

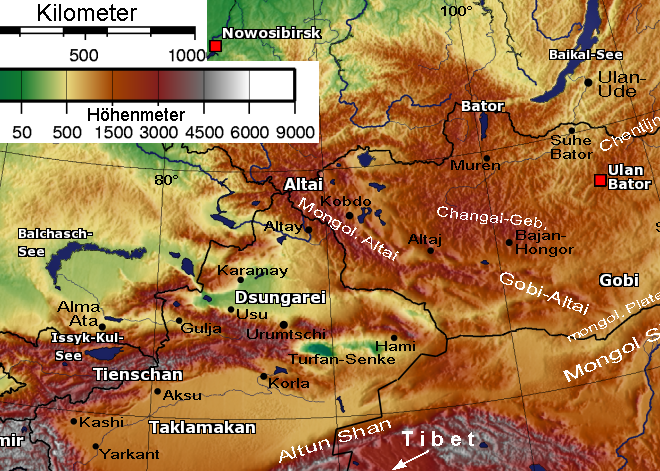
Physical map showing the separation of Dzungaria and the Tarim Basin (Altishahr) by the Tien Shan Mountains

Xinjiang consists of two main geographically, historically, and ethnically distinct regions with different historical names, Dzungaria north of the Tianshan Mountains and the Tarim Basin south of the Tianshan Mountains. In 1884, the Qing established the province of Xinjiang. At the time of the Qing conquest in 1759, Dzungaria was inhabited by steppe-dwelling, nomadic Tibetan Buddhist Dzungar people and the Tarim Basin by sedentary, oasis-dwelling, Turkic-speaking Muslim farmers, now known as the Uyghurs, who were governed separately until 1884.

The Qing dynasty was well aware of the differences between the former Buddhist Mongol area in the north and the Turkic Muslim area in the south, and ruled them in separate administrative units at first. But Qing people began to think of both areas as part of a single region called Xinjiang. The very concept of Xinjiang as a single geographic identity was created by the Qing. During Qing rule, ordinary Xinjiang people had no sense of "regional identity"; rather, Xinjiang's distinct identity was given to the region by the Qing, since it had distinctive geography, history, and culture, while at the same time it was created by the Chinese, multicultural, settled by Han and Hui, and separated from Central Asia for over a century and a half.

In the late 19th century, some people were still proposing that two separate regions be created out of Xinjiang, the area north of the Tianshan and the area south of the Tianshan, while it was being debated whether to make Xinjiang a province.

Xinjiang is a large, sparsely populated area, spanning over 1.6 million km^{2} (comparable in size to Iran), about a sixth of China's territory. Xinjiang borders the Tibet Autonomous Region and India's Leh district in Ladakh to the south, Qinghai and Gansu provinces to the east, Mongolia (Bayan-Ölgii, Govi-Altai and Khovd Provinces) to the east, Russia's Altai Republic to the north, and Kazakhstan (Almaty and East Kazakhstan Regions), Kyrgyzstan (Issyk-Kul, Naryn and Osh Regions), Tajikistan's Gorno-Badakhshan Autonomous Region, Afghanistan's Badakhshan Province, and Pakistan's Gilgit-Baltistan to the west.

The east–west chain of the Tian Shan separates Dzungaria in the north from the Tarim Basin in the south. Dzungaria is a dry steppe and the Tarim Basin contains the massive Taklamakan Desert, surrounded by oases. In the east is the Turpan Depression. In the west, the Tian Shan split, forming the Ili River valley.

== History ==
=== Early history ===
The earliest inhabitants of the region encompassing modern day Xinjiang were genetically of Ancient North Eurasian and Northeast Asian origin, with later geneflow from during the Bronze Age linked to the expansion of early Indo-Europeans. These population dynamics gave rise to a heterogeneous demographic makeup. Iron Age samples from Xinjiang show intensified levels of admixture between Steppe pastoralists and northeast Asians, with northern and eastern Xinjiang showing more affinities with northeast Asians, and southern Xinjiang showing more affinity with central Asians.

Between 2009 and 2015, the remains of 92 individuals in the Xiaohe Cemetery were analyzed for Y chromosome and mitochondrial DNA markers. Genetic analyses of the mummies showed that the paternal lineages of the Xiaohe people were of almost all European origin, while the maternal lineages of the early population were diverse, featuring both East Eurasian and West Eurasian lineages, as well as a smaller number of Indian / South Asian lineages. Over time, the west Eurasian maternal lineages were gradually replaced by east Eurasian maternal lineages. Outmarriage to women from Siberian communities led to the loss of the original diversity of mtDNA lineages observed in the earlier Xiaohe population.

The Tarim population was therefore always notably diverse, reflecting a complex history of admixture between people of Ancient North Eurasian, South Asian and Northeast Asian descent. The Tarim mummies have been found in various locations in the Western Tarim Basin such as Loulan, the Xiaohe Tomb complex and Qäwrighul. These mummies have been previously suggested to have been Tocharian or Indo-European speakers, but recent evidence suggest that the earliest mummies belonged to a distinct population unrelated to Indo-European pastoralists and spoke an unknown language, probably a language isolate.

Although many of the Tarim mummies were classified as Caucasoid by anthropologists, Tarim Basin sites also contain both "Caucasoid" and "Mongoloid" remains, indicating contact between newly arrived western nomads and agricultural communities in the east. Mummies have been found in various locations in the Western Tarim Basin such as Loulan, the Xiaohe Tomb complex and Qäwrighul.

Nomadic tribes such as the Yuezhi, Saka and Wusun were probably part of the migration of Indo-European speakers who had settled in Tarim Basin of Xinjiang long before the Xiongnu and Han Chinese. By the time the Han dynasty under Emperor Wu (r. 141–87 BC) wrested the western Tarim Basin away from its previous overlords (the Xiongnu), it was inhabited by various peoples who included the Indo-European-speaking Tocharians in Turfan and Kucha, the Saka peoples centered in the Shule Kingdom and the Kingdom of Khotan, the various Tibeto-Burmese groups (especially people related to the Qiang) as well as the Han Chinese people. Some linguists posit that the Tocharian language had high amounts of influence from Paleosiberian languages, such as Uralic and Yeniseian languages.

Yuezhi culture is documented in the region. The first known reference to the Yuezhi was in 645 BC by the Chinese chancellor Guan Zhong in his work, Guanzi (管子, Guanzi Essays: 73: 78: 80: 81). He described the Yúshì, 禺氏 (or Niúshì, 牛氏), as a people from the north-west who supplied jade to the Chinese from the nearby mountains (also known as Yushi) in Gansu. The longtime jade supply from the Tarim Basin is well-documented archaeologically: "It is well known that ancient Chinese rulers had a strong attachment to jade. All of the jade items excavated from the tomb of Fuhao of the Shang dynasty, more than 750 pieces, were from Khotan in modern Xinjiang. As early as the mid-first millennium BC, the Yuezhi engaged in the jade trade, of which the major consumers were the rulers of agricultural China."

=== Chinese protectorates ===
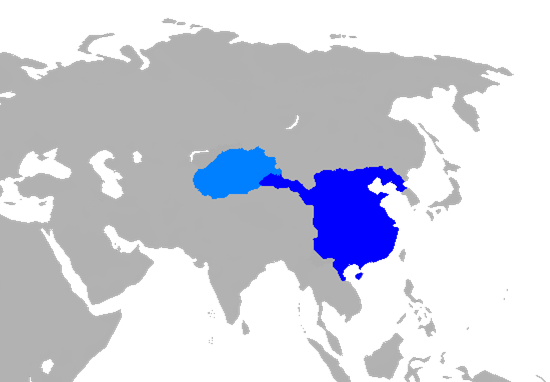
Protectorate of the Western Regions (light blue) within Han dynasty, 2nd century BC

Protectorate General to Pacify the West (light red) within Tang dynasty, 7th century

Crossed by the Northern Silk Road, the Tarim and Dzungaria regions were known as the Western Regions. At the beginning of the Han dynasty the region was ruled by the Xiongnu, a powerful nomadic people. During the 2nd century BC, the Han dynasty prepared for war against Xiongnu when Emperor Wu of Han dispatched Zhang Qian to explore the mysterious kingdoms to the west and form an alliance with the Yuezhi against the Xiongnu. As a result of the war, the Chinese controlled the strategic region from the Ordos and Gansu corridor to Lop Nor. They separated the Xiongnu from the Qiang people on the south and gained direct access to the Western Regions. Han China sent Zhang Qian as an envoy to the states of the region, beginning several decades of struggle between the Xiongnu and Han China in which China eventually prevailed. During the 100s BCE, the Silk Road brought increasing Chinese economic and cultural influence to the region. In 60 BCE, Han China established the Protectorate of the Western Regions (西域都護府) at Wulei (烏壘, near modern Luntai), to oversee the region as far west as the Pamir Mountains. The protectorate was seized during the civil war against Wang Mang (r. AD 9–23), returning to Han control in 91 due to the efforts of general Ban Chao.

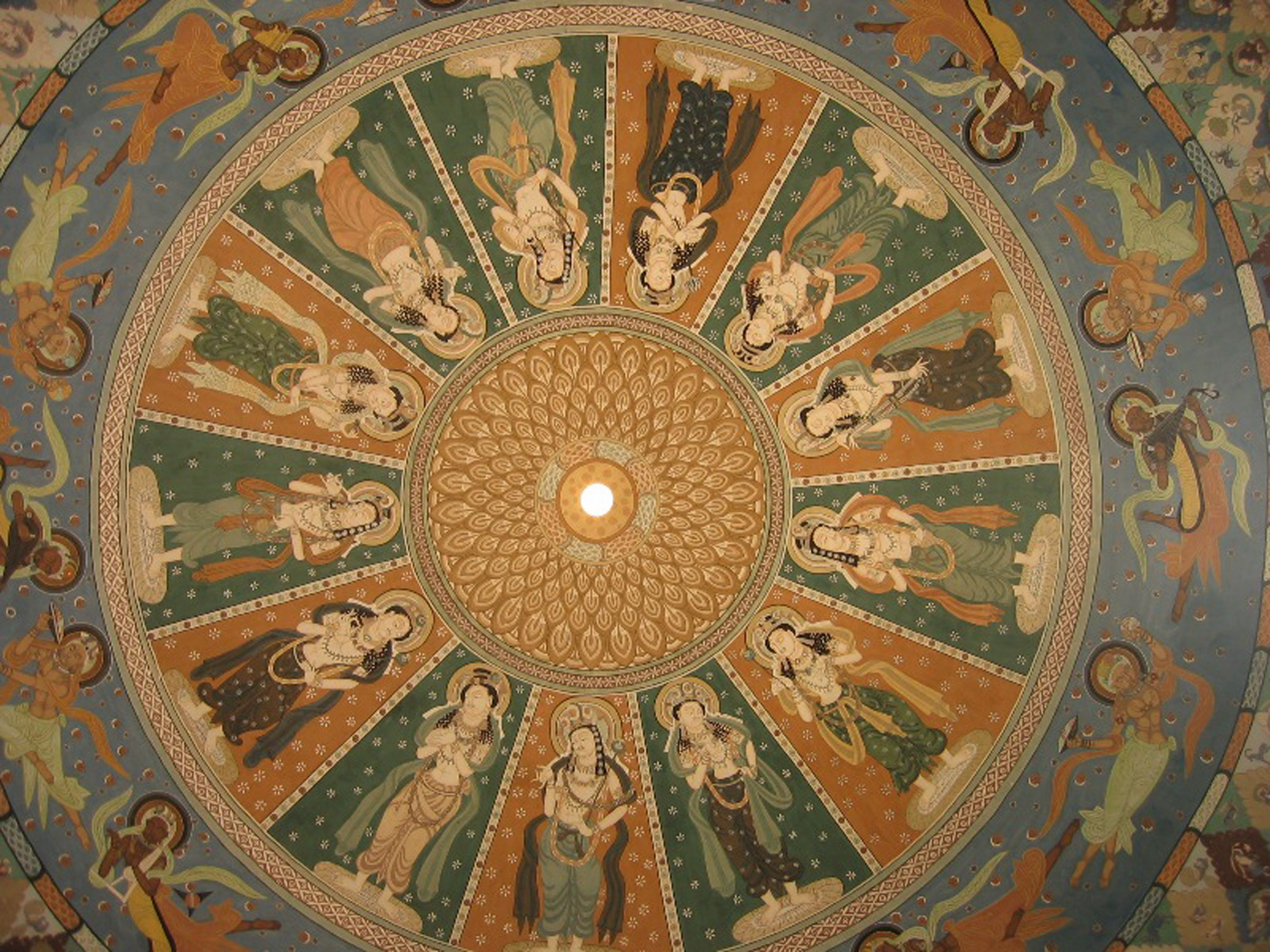
Old Uyghur / Yugur art from the Bezeklik murals

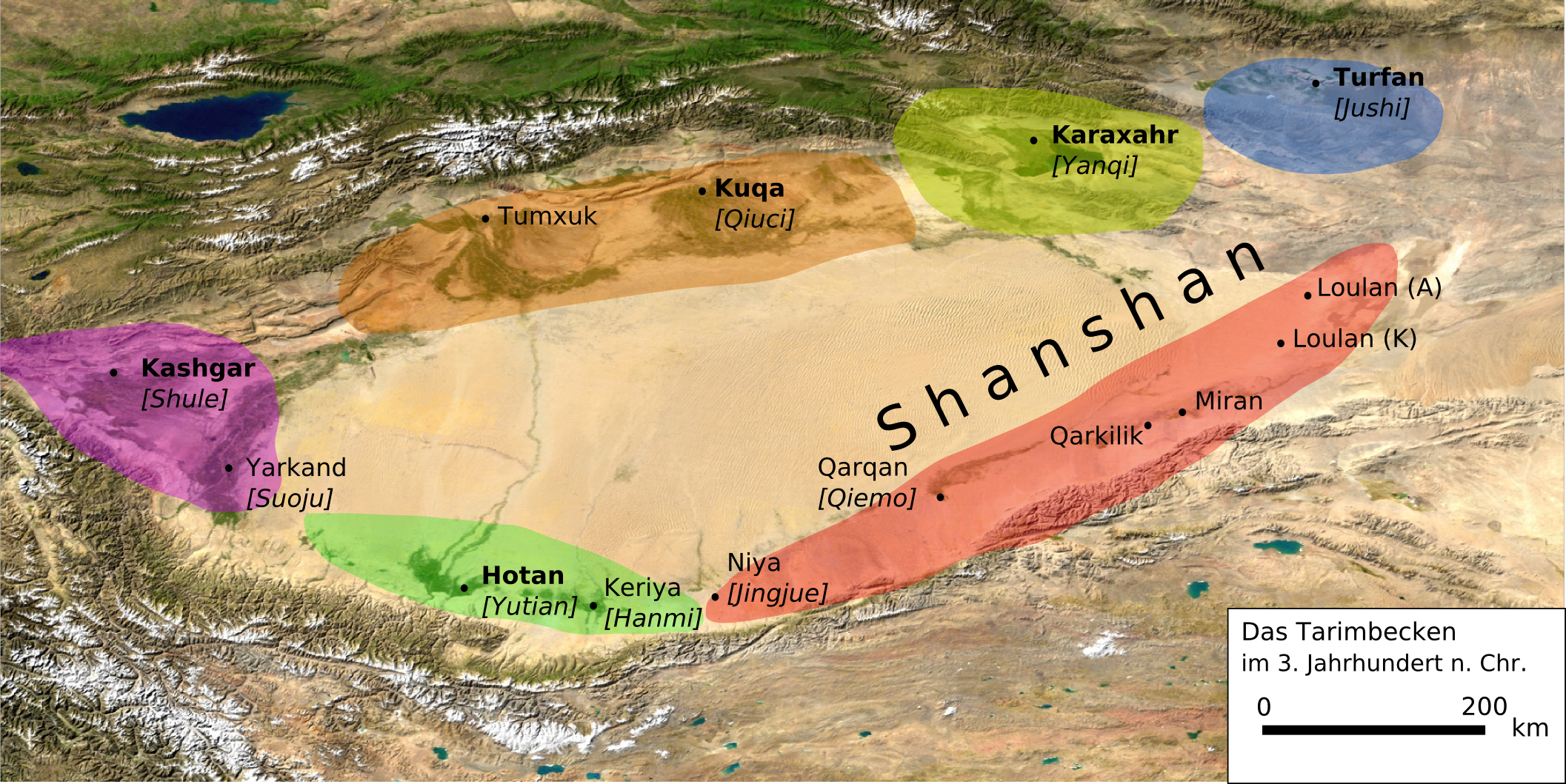
The Tarim Basin in the 3rd century AD

The Western Jin dynasty succumbed to successive waves of invasions by nomads from the north at the beginning of the 4th century. The short-lived kingdoms that ruled northwestern China one after the other, including Former Liang, Former Qin, Later Liang and Western Liáng, all attempted to maintain the protectorate, with varying degrees of success. After the final reunification of Northern China under the Northern Wei empire, its protectorate controlled what is now the southeastern region of Xinjiang. Local states such as Shule, Yutian, Guizi and Qiemo controlled the western region, while the central region around Turpan was controlled by Gaochang, remnants of a state (Northern Liang) that once ruled part of what is now Gansu province in northwestern China.

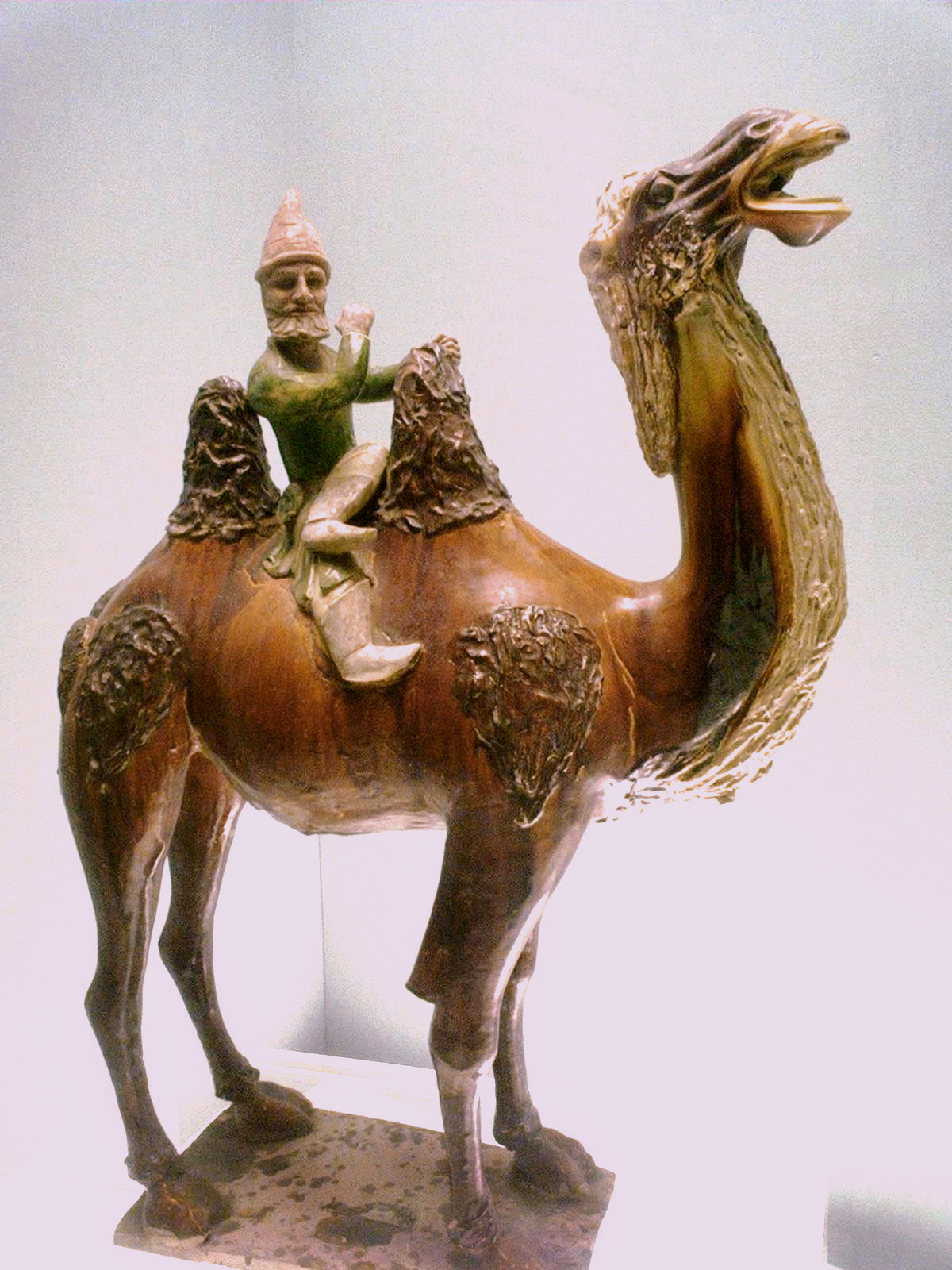
A Sogdian man on a Bactrian camel. Sancai ceramic statuette, Tang dynasty

During the Tang dynasty, a series of expeditions were conducted against the Western Turkic Khaganate and their vassals: the oasis states of southern Xinjiang. Campaigns against the oasis states began under Emperor Taizong with the annexation of Gaochang in 640. The nearby kingdom of Karasahr was captured by the Tang in 644 and the kingdom of Kucha was conquered in 649. The Tang Dynasty then established the Protectorate General to Pacify the West (安西都護府) or Anxi Protectorate, in 640 to control the region.

During the Anshi Rebellion, which nearly destroyed the Tang dynasty, Tibet invaded the Tang on a broad front from Xinjiang to Yunnan. It occupied the Tang capital of Chang'an in 763 for 16 days, and controlled southern Xinjiang by the end of the century. The Uyghur Khaganate took control of Northern Xinjiang, much of Central Asia and Mongolia at the same time.

As Tibet and the Uyghur Khaganate declined in the mid-9th century, the Kara-Khanid Khanate (a confederation of Turkic tribes including the Karluks, Chigils and Yaghmas) controlled Western Xinjiang during the 10th and 11th centuries. After the Uyghur Khaganate in Mongolia was destroyed by the Kirghiz in 840, branches of the Uyghurs established themselves in Qocha (Karakhoja) and Beshbalik (near present-day Turfan and Ürümqi). The Uyghur state remained in eastern Xinjiang until the 13th century, although it was ruled by foreign overlords. The Kara-Khanids converted to Islam. The Uyghur state in Eastern Xinjiang, initially Manichean, later converted to Buddhism.

Remnants of the Liao dynasty from Manchuria entered Xinjiang in 1132, fleeing rebellion by the neighboring Jurchens. They established a new empire, the Qara Khitai (Western Liao), which ruled the Kara-Khanid and Uyghur-held parts of the Tarim Basin for the next century. Although Khitan and Chinese were the primary administrative languages, Persian and Uyghur were also used.

=== Islamization ===
Present-day Xinjiang consisted of the Tarim Basin and Dzungaria and was originally inhabited by Indo-European Tocharians and Iranian Sakas who practiced Buddhism and Zoroastrianism. The Turfan and Tarim Basins were inhabited by speakers of Tocharian languages, with Caucasian mummies found in the region. The area became Islamified during the 10th century with the conversion of the Kara-Khanid Khanate, who occupied Kashgar. During the mid-10th century, the Saka Buddhist Kingdom of Khotan was attacked by the Turkic Muslim Karakhanid ruler Musa; the Karakhanid leader Yusuf Qadir Khan conquered Khotan around 1006.

=== Mongol period ===
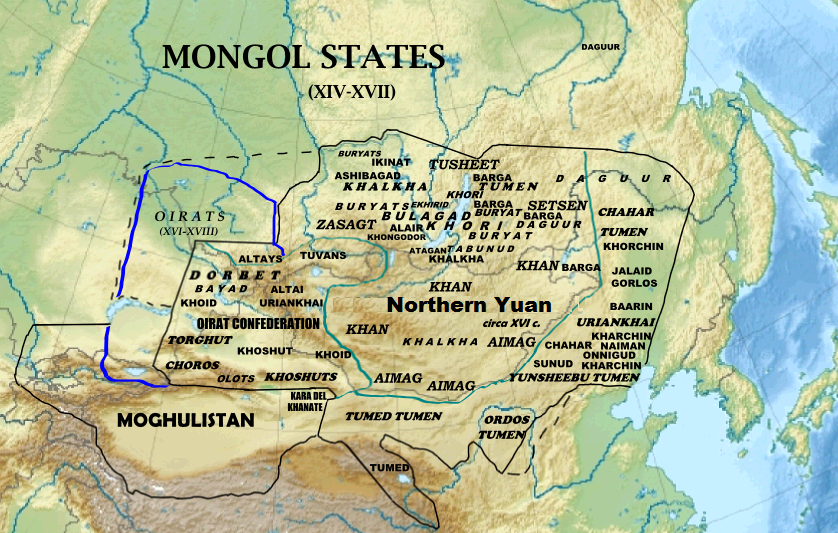
Mongol states from the 14th to the 17th centuries: the Northern Yuan dynasty, Four Oirat, Moghulistan and Kara Del

After Genghis Khan unified Mongolia and began his advance west the Uyghur state in the Turpan-Urumchi region offered its allegiance to the Mongols in 1209, contributing taxes and troops to the Mongol imperial effort. In return, the Uyghur rulers retained control of their kingdom; Genghis Khan's Mongol Empire conquered the Qara Khitai in 1218. Xinjiang was a stronghold of Ögedei Khan and later came under the control of his descendant, Kaidu. This branch of the Mongol family kept the Yuan dynasty at bay until their rule ended.

During the Mongol Empire era the Yuan dynasty vied with the Chagatai Khanate for rule of the region and the latter controlled most of it. After the Chagatai Khanate divided into smaller khanates during the mid-14th century, the politically fractured region was ruled by a number of Persianized Mongol Khans, including those from Moghulistan (with the assistance of local Dughlat emirs), Uigurstan (later Turpan) and Kashgaria. These leaders warred with each other and the Timurids of Transoxiana to the west and the Oirats to the east: the successor Chagatai regime based in Mongolia and China. During the 17th century, the Dzungars established an empire over much of the region.

The Mongolian Dzungars were the collective identity of several Oirat tribes which formed and maintained one of the last nomadic empires. The Dzungar Khanate covered Dzungaria, extending from the western Great Wall of China to present-day Eastern Kazakhstan and from present-day Northern Kyrgyzstan to Southern Siberia. Most of the region was renamed "Xinjiang" by the Chinese after the fall of the Dzungar Empire, which existed from the early 17th to the mid-18th century.

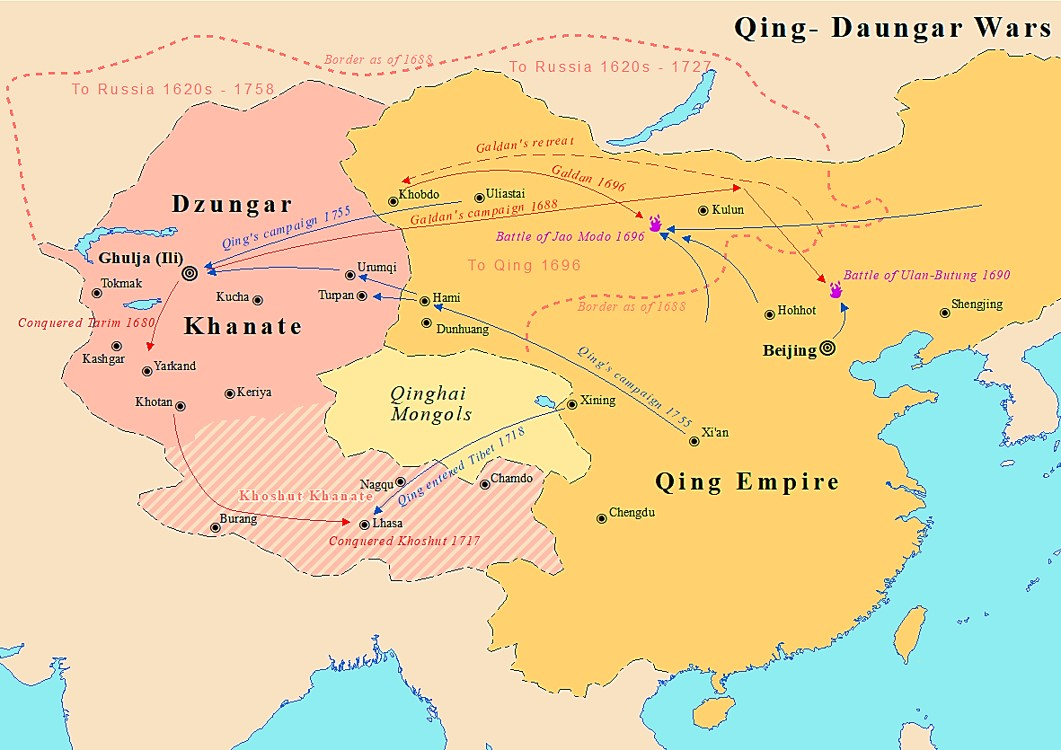
The Dzungar–Qing Wars, between the Qing Dynasty and the Dzungar Khanate

The sedentary Turkic Muslims of the Tarim Basin were originally ruled by the Chagatai Khanate and the nomadic Buddhist Oirat Mongols in Dzungaria ruled the Dzungar Khanate. The Naqshbandi Sufi Khojas, descendants of Muhammad, had replaced the Chagatayid Khans as rulers of the Tarim Basin during the early 17th century. There was a struggle between two Khoja factions: the Afaqi (White Mountain) and the Ishaqi (Black Mountain). The Ishaqi defeated the Afaqi and the Afaq Khoja invited the 5th Dalai Lama (the leader of the Tibetans) to intervene on his behalf in 1677. The Dalai Lama then called on his Dzungar Buddhist followers in the Dzungar Khanate to act on the invitation. The Dzungar Khanate conquered the Tarim Basin in 1680, setting up the Afaqi Khoja as their puppet ruler. After converting to Islam, the descendants of the previously-Buddhist Uyghurs in Turfan believed that the "infidel Kalmuks" (Dzungars) built Buddhist monuments in their region.

=== Qing dynasty ===
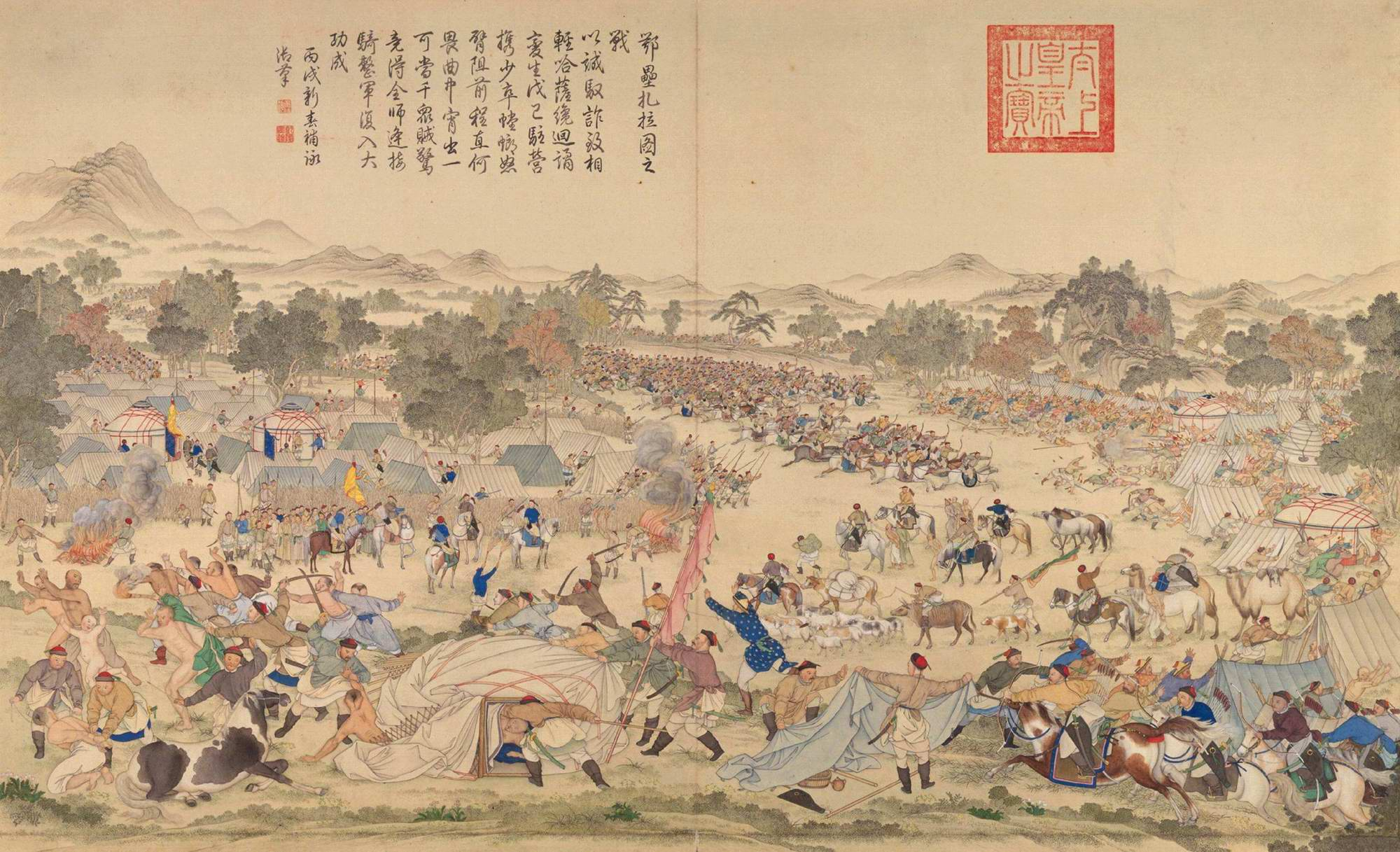
The Battle of Oroi-Jalatu in 1756, between the Manchu and Oirat armies

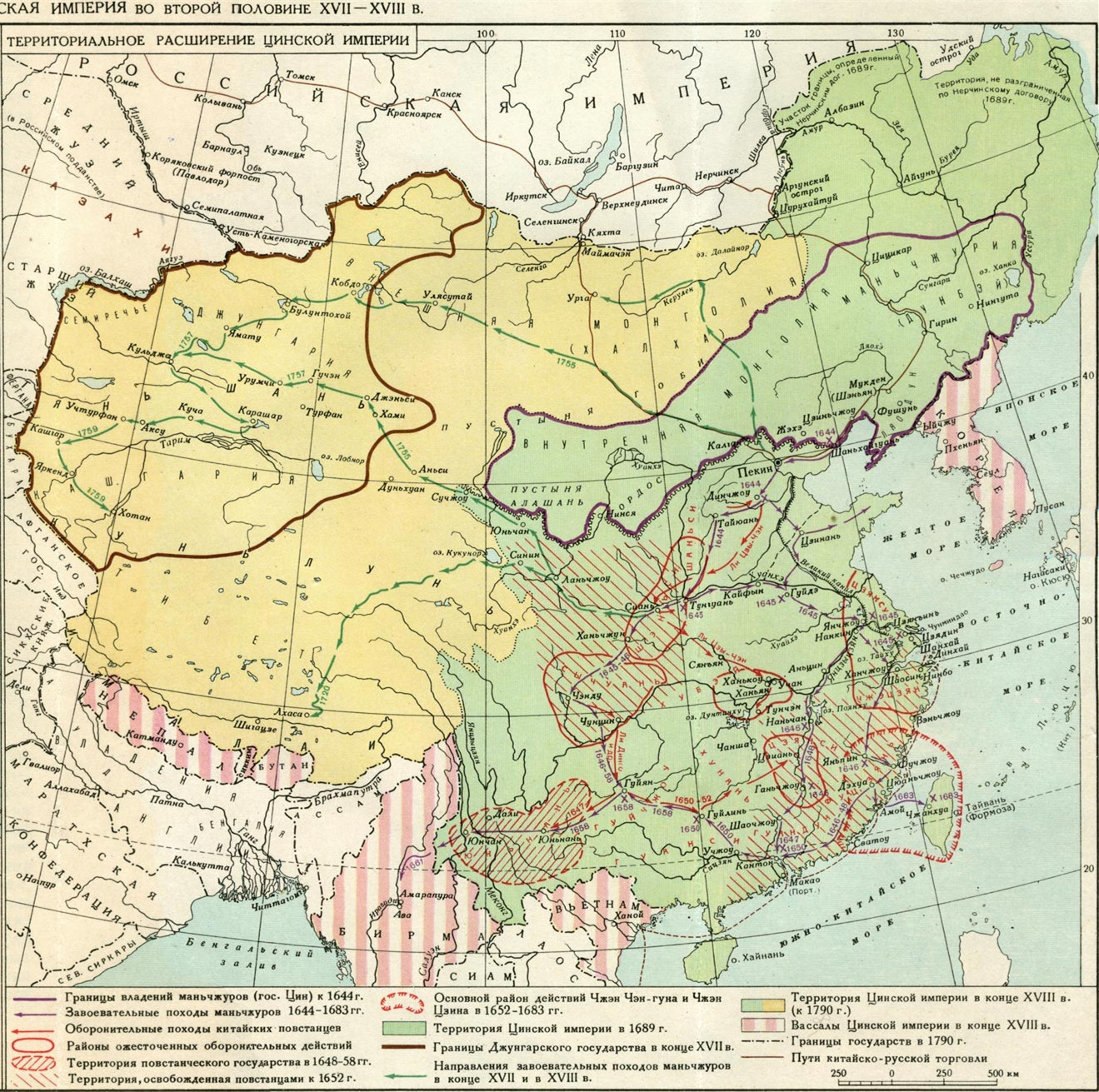
The Qing Empire ca. 1820

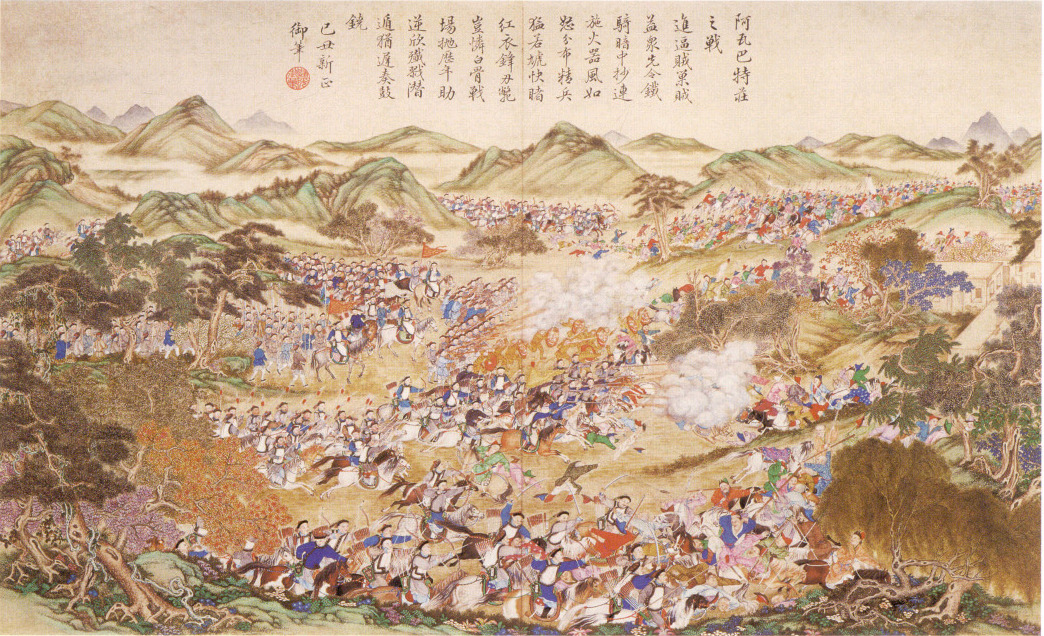
Scene from the 1828 Qing campaign against rebels in Altishahr

The Turkic Muslims of the Turfan and Kumul oases then submitted to the Qing dynasty and asked China to free them from the Dzungars; the Qing accepted their rulers as vassals. They warred against the Dzungars for decades before defeating them; Qing Manchu Bannermen then conducted the Dzungar genocide, nearly eradicating them and depopulating Dzungaria. The Qing freed the Afaqi Khoja leader Burhan-ud-din and his brother, Khoja Jihan, from Dzungar imprisonment and appointed them to rule the Tarim Basin as Qing vassals. The Khoja brothers reneged on the agreement, declaring themselves independent leaders of the Tarim Basin. The Qing and the Turfan leader Emin Khoja crushed their revolt, and by 1759 China controlled Dzungaria and the Tarim Basin.

The Manchu Qing dynasty gained control of eastern Xinjiang as a result of a long struggle with the Dzungars which began during the 17th century. In 1755, with the help of the Oirat noble Amursana, the Qing attacked Ghulja and captured the Dzungar khan. After Amursana's request to be declared Dzungar khan went unanswered, he led a revolt against the Qing. Qing armies destroyed the remnants of the Dzungar Khanate over the next two years, and many Han Chinese and Hui moved into the pacified areas.

The native Dzungar Oirat Mongols suffered greatly from the brutal campaigns and a simultaneous smallpox epidemic. Writer Wei Yuan described the resulting desolation in present-day northern Xinjiang as "an empty plain for several thousand li, with no Oirat yurt except those surrendered." It has been estimated that 80 percent of the 600,000 (or more) Dzungars died from a combination of disease and warfare, and recovery took generations.

Han and Hui merchants were initially only allowed to trade in the Tarim Basin; their settlement in the Tarim Basin was banned until the 1830 Muhammad Yusuf Khoja invasion, when the Qing rewarded merchants for fighting off Khoja by allowing them to settle in the basin. The Uyghur Muslim Sayyid and Naqshbandi Sufi rebel of the Afaqi suborder, Jahangir Khoja was sliced to death (Lingchi) in 1828 by the Manchus for leading a rebellion against the Qing. According to Robert Montgomery Martin, many Chinese with a variety of occupations were settled in Dzungaria in 1870; in Turkestan (the Tarim Basin), however, only a few Chinese merchants and garrison soldiers were interspersed with the Muslim population.

The 1765 Ush rebellion by the Uyghurs against the Manchu began after Uyghur women were raped by the servants and son of Manchu official Su-cheng. It was said that "Ush Muslims had long wanted to sleep on [Sucheng and son's] hides and eat their flesh" because of the months-long abuse. The Manchu emperor ordered the massacre of the Uyghur rebel town; Qing forces enslaved the Uyghur children and women, and killed the Uyghur men. Sexual abuse of Uyghur women by Manchu soldiers and officials triggered deep Uyghur hostility against Manchu rule.

==== Yettishar ====
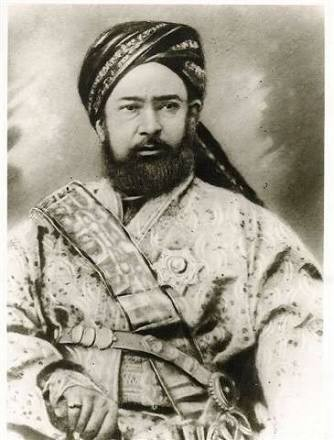
Yakub Beg, ruler of Yettishar

By the 1860s, Xinjiang had been under Qing rule for a century. The region was captured in 1759 from the Dzungar Khanate, whose population (the Oirats) became the targets of genocide. Xinjiang was primarily semi-arid or desert and unattractive to non-trading Han settlers, and others (including the Uyghurs) settled there.

The Dungan Revolt by the Muslim Hui and other Muslim ethnic groups was fought in China's Shaanxi, Ningxia and Gansu provinces and in Xinjiang from 1862 to 1877. The conflict led to a reported 20.77 million deaths due to migration and war, with many refugees dying of starvation. Thousands of Muslim refugees from Shaanxi fled to Gansu; some formed battalions in eastern Gansu, intending to reconquer their lands in Shaanxi. While the Hui rebels were preparing to attack Gansu and Shaanxi, Yakub Beg (an Uzbek or Tajik commander of the Kokand Khanate) fled from the khanate in 1865 after losing Tashkent to the Russians. Beg settled in Kashgar, and soon controlled Xinjiang. Although he encouraged trade, built caravansareis, canals and other irrigation systems, his regime was considered harsh. The Chinese took decisive action against Yettishar; an army under General Zuo Zongtang rapidly approached Kashgaria, reconquering it on 16 May 1877.

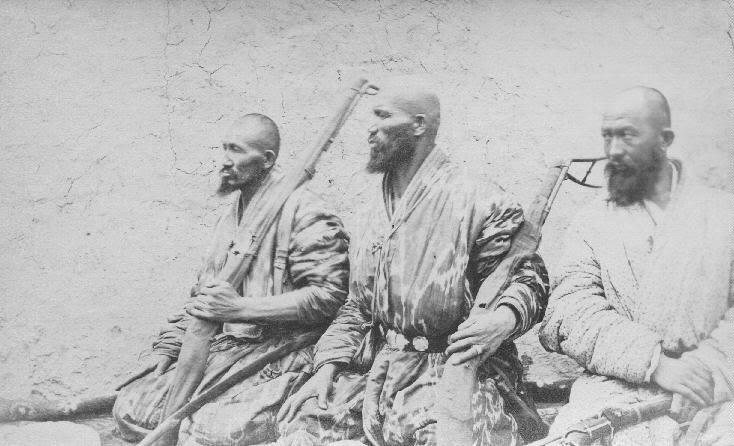
19th-century Khotan Uyghurs in Yettishar

After reconquering Xinjiang in the late 1870s from Yakub Beg, the Qing dynasty established Xinjiang ("new frontier") as a province in 1884 – making it part of China, and dropping the old names of Zhunbu (準部, Dzungar Region) and Huijiang (Muslimland). Many Uyghurs subsequently migrated from southern Xinjiang to the fertile lands of the north and east, sometimes with the support of the Qing government.

=== Republic of China ===
In 1912, the Qing dynasty was replaced by the Republic of China. Yuan Dahua, the last Qing governor of Xinjiang, fled. One of his subordinates, Yang Zengxin, took control of the province and acceded in name to the Republic of China in March of the same year. Through Machiavellian politics and clever balancing of mixed ethnic constituencies, Yang maintained control over Xinjiang until his assassination in 1928 after the Northern Expedition of the Kuomintang.

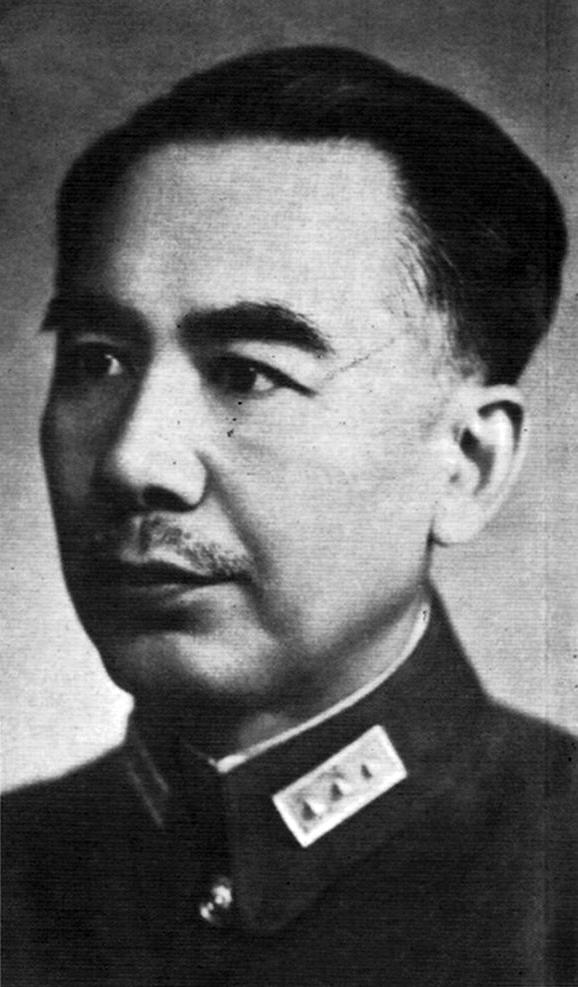
Governor Sheng Shicai ruled from 1933 to 1944.

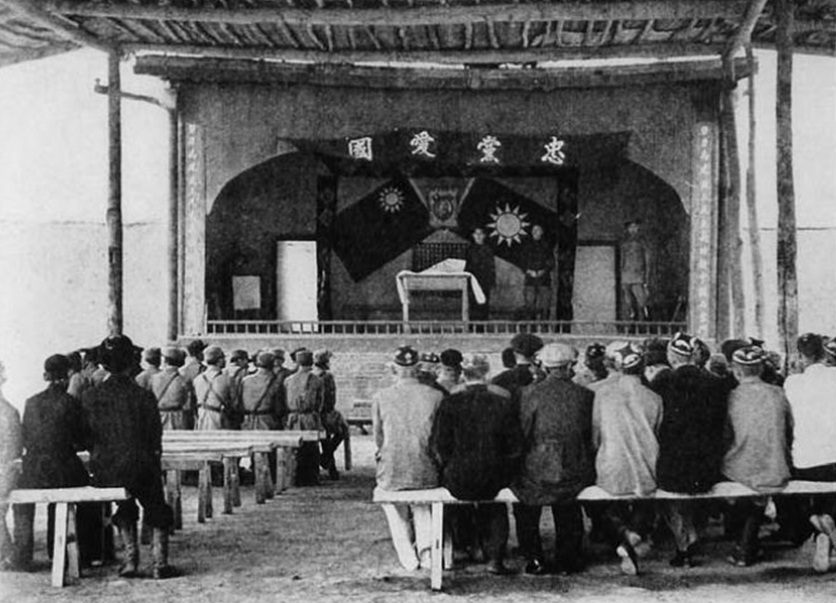
Kuomintang in Xinjiang, 1942

The Kumul Rebellion and other rebellions arose against his successor Jin Shuren in the early 1930s throughout Xinjiang, involving Uyghurs, other Turkic groups, and Hui (Muslim) Chinese. Jin drafted White Russians to crush the revolt. In the Kashgar region on 12 November 1933, the short-lived self-proclaimed First East Turkistan Republic was declared after debate about whether it should be called "East Turkestan" or "Uyghuristan". The region claimed by the ETR encompassed the Kashgar, Khotan and Aksu Prefectures in southwestern Xinjiang. The Chinese Muslim Kuomintang 36th Division (National Revolutionary Army) defeated the army of the First East Turkestan Republic in the 1934 Battle of Kashgar, ending the republic after Chinese Muslims executed its two emirs: Abdullah Bughra and Nur Ahmad Jan Bughra.

The Soviet Union invaded the province in the Soviet Invasion of Xinjiang. In the Xinjiang War (1937), the entire province was brought under the control of northeast Manchu warlord Sheng Shicai, who ruled Xinjiang for the next decade with close support from the Soviet Union. In 1944, the President and Premier of China, Chiang Kai-shek, informed by the Soviets of Sheng's intention to join the Soviet Union, decided to shift him out of Xinjiang to Chongqing as the Minister of Agriculture and Forest. More than a decade of Sheng's era had ended. However, a short-lived Soviet-backed Second East Turkestan Republic was established in that year, which lasted until 1949 in what is now Ili Kazakh Autonomous Prefecture (Ili, Tarbagatay and Altay Districts) in northern Xinjiang.

During the Ili Rebellion the Soviet Union backed Uyghur separatists to form the East Turkestan Republic (ETR) in Ili region while the majority of Xinjiang was under the control of the Republic of China. In 1946, the ROC government and the ETR agreed to establish the Coalition Government of Xinjiang Province, although it collapsed shortly after in 1947. After the People's Liberation Army entered Xinjiang in 1949, the original provincial government was relocated to Taipei as the Sinkiang Provincial Government Office (新疆省政府辦事處) to symbolize the ROC's claim of sovereignty over the province; it was eventually dissolved in 1992.

=== Soviet partial occupation ===
The Soviet Union invaded the province; it was brought under the control of northeast Han warlord Sheng Shicai after the 1937 Xinjiang War. Sheng ruled Xinjiang for the next decade with support from the Soviet Union, many of whose ethnic and security policies he instituted. The Soviet Union maintained a military base in the province and deployed several military and economic advisors. Sheng invited a group of Chinese Communists to Xinjiang (including Mao Zedong's brother, Mao Zemin), but executed them all in 1943 in fear of a conspiracy. In 1944, President and Premier of China Chiang Kai-shek, informed by the Soviet Union of Shicai's intention to join it, transferred him to Chongqing as the Minister of Agriculture and Forestry the following year. During the Ili Rebellion, the Soviet Union backed Uyghur separatists to form the Second East Turkestan Republic (ETR) in the Ili region while most of Xinjiang remained under Kuomintang control.

=== People's Republic of China ===
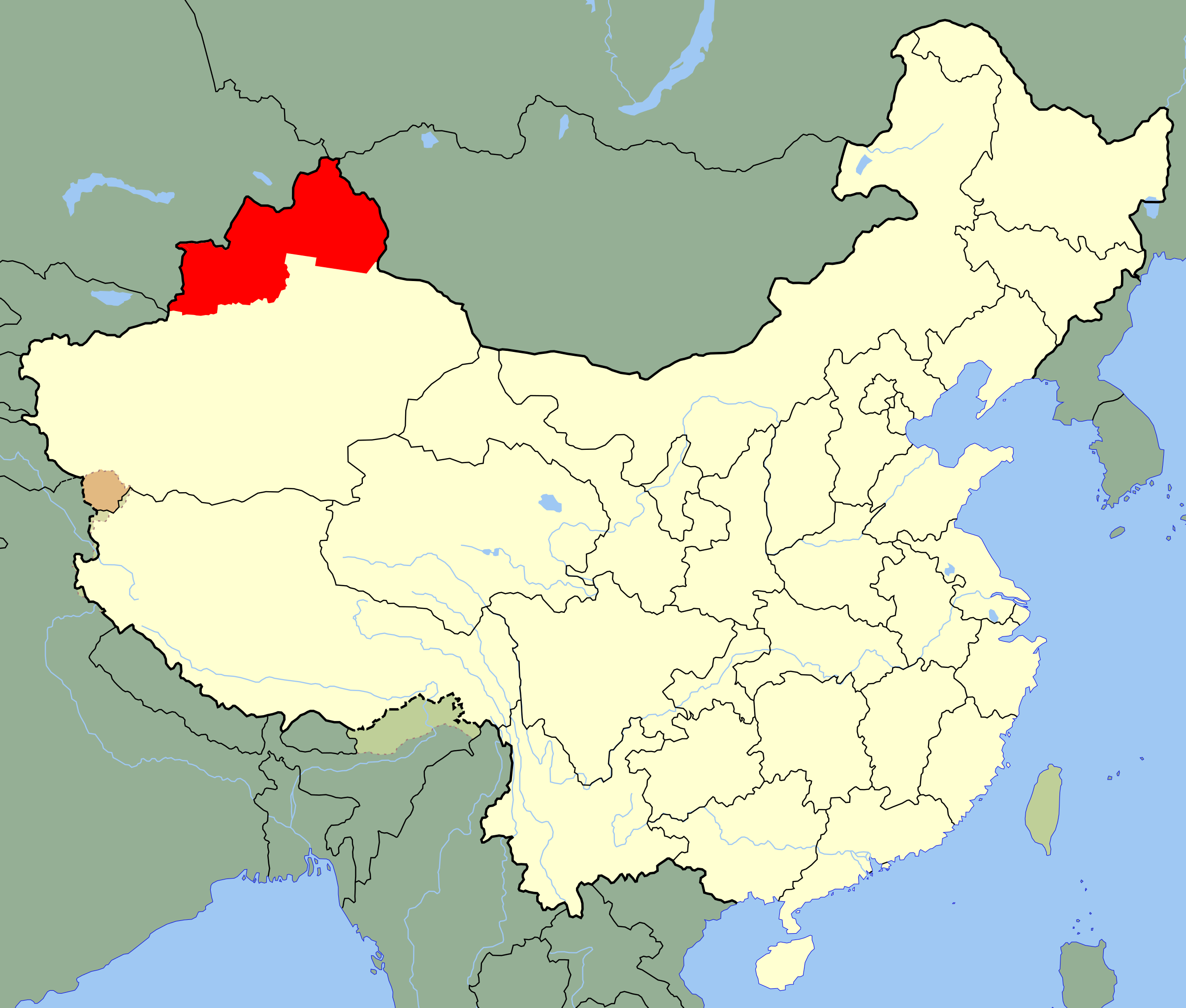
The Soviet-backed Second East Turkestan Republic encompassed Xinjiang's Ili, Tarbagatay and Altay districts.

During the final stages of the Chinese Civil War, the People's Liberation Army (PLA) held a decisive advantage, while the Nationalist Army suffered successive defeats. After the First Field Army, commanded by Peng Dehuai, captured Lanzhou and subsequently the entire Gansu province on 26 August 1949, the military and political leaders of Xinjiang, including Tao Zhiyue and Burhan Shahidi, declared an uprising against the ROC government. Zhang Zhizhong, who had already sided with the Chinese Communist Party (CCP), mediated the conflict, while Deng Liqun served as the CCP's negotiator. Five ETR leaders who were to negotiate with the Chinese about ETR sovereignty died in an airplane crash that year in the outskirts of Kabansk in the Russian SFSR. The PRC continued the migration of Han Chinese in Xinjiang to dilute the percentage of the Uyghur population.

That same year, the Soviet Union ordered the Three Districts Economic Commission insurgents to halt their advance into Dihua (now Ürümqi) and surrender to the People's Republic of China. On 25 September, the First Army Corps of the First Field Army, led by General Wang Zhen, captured Dihua, making Xinjiang a province of the People's Republic of China. On 17 December, the Xinjiang Provincial People's Government was established, with Burhan Shahidi as its first chairman.

On 13 September 1955, the 21st meeting of the Standing Committee of the 1st National People's Congress decided to change the status of Xinjiang from a province to an administrative area. On 1 October, the Xinjiang Uygur Autonomous Region was established, and the Xinjiang Uygur Autonomous Region People's Committee was subsequently established, becoming one of China's five provincial-level minority autonomous regions.

That year (the first modern census in China was taken in 1953), Uyghurs were 73 percent of Xinjiang's total population of 5.11 million. Although Xinjiang has been designated a "Uygur Autonomous Region" since 1955, more than 50 percent of its area is designated autonomous areas for 13 native non-Uyghur groups. Modern Uyghurs developed ethnogenesis in 1955, when the PRC recognized formerly separately self-identified oasis peoples. Southern Xinjiang is home to most of the Uyghur population, about nine million people, out of a total population of twenty million; fifty-five percent of Xinjiang's Han population, mainly urban, live in the north. This created an economic imbalance, since the northern Junghar basin (Dzungaria) is more developed than the south.

Land reform and collectivization occurred in Uyghur agricultural areas at the same general pace as in most of China. Hunger in Xinjiang was not as great as elsewhere in China during the Great Leap Forward and a million Han Chinese fleeing famine resettled in Xinjiang.

In 1980, China allowed the United States to establish electronic listening stations in Xinjiang so the United States could monitor Soviet rocket launches in central Asia in exchange for the United States authorizing the sale of dual-use civilian and military technology and nonlethal military equipment to China.

The reform and opening up since the late 1970s has exacerbated uneven regional development, more Uyghurs have migrated to Xinjiang's cities and some Han have migrated to Xinjiang for economic advancement. Chinese leader Deng Xiaoping made a nine-day visit to Xinjiang in 1981 and described the region as "unsteady". The Deng era reforms encouraged China's ethnic minorities, including Uyghurs, to establish small private companies for commodity transit, retail, and restaurants. By the early 1990s, a total of 19 billion yuan had been spent in Xinjiang on large- and medium-sized industrial projects, with an emphasis on developing modern transportation, communications infrastructure, and support for the oil and gas industries.

A brisk cross-border shuttle trade by Uyghurs further developed following the adoption of the Soviet Union's perestroika.

Increased ethnic contact and labor competition has coincided with Uyghur terrorism since the 1990s, such as the 1997 Ürümqi bus bombings.

In 2000, Uyghurs made up 45 percent of Xinjiang's population and 13 percent of Ürümqi's population. With nine percent of Xinjiang's population, Ürümqi accounts for 25 percent of the region's GDP; many rural Uyghurs have migrated to the city for work in its light, heavy and petrochemical industries. Han in Xinjiang are older, better-educated and work in higher-paying professions than their Uyghur counterparts. Han are more likely to cite business reasons for moving to Ürümqi, while some Uyghurs cite legal trouble at home and family reasons for moving to the city. Han and Uyghurs are equally represented in Ürümqi's floating population, which works primarily in commerce. Auto-segregation in the city is widespread in residential concentration, employment relationships and endogamy. In 2010, Uyghurs were a majority in the Tarim Basin and a plurality in Xinjiang as a whole.

Xinjiang has 81 public libraries and 23 museums, compared to none in 1949. It has 98 newspapers in 44 languages, compared with four in 1952. According to official statistics, the ratio of doctors, medical workers, clinics and hospital beds to the general population surpasses the national average; the immunization rate has reached 85 percent.

The ongoing Xinjiang conflict includes the 2007 Xinjiang raid, a thwarted 2008 suicide-bombing attempt on a China Southern Airlines flight, the 2008 Kashgar attack which killed 16 police officers four days before the Beijing Olympics, the August 2009 syringe attacks, the 2011 Hotan attack, the 2014 Kunming attack, the April 2014 Ürümqi attack, and the May 2014 Ürümqi attack. Several of the attacks were orchestrated by the Turkistan Islamic Party (formerly the East Turkestan Islamic Movement), identified as a terrorist group by several entities (including Russia, Turkey, the United Kingdom, the United States until October 2020, and the United Nations).

In 2014, Chinese Communist Party (CCP) leadership in Xinjiang commenced a People's War against the "Three Evil Forces" of separatism, terrorism, and extremism. They deployed two hundred thousand party cadres to Xinjiang and the launched the Civil Servant-Family Pair Up program. Chinese Communist Party leader Xi Jinping was dissatisfied with the initial results of the People's War and replaced Zhang Chunxian with Chen Quanguo as Party Committee Secretary in 2016. Following his appointment Chen oversaw the recruitment of tens of thousands of additional police officers and the division of society into three categories: trusted, average, untrustworthy. He instructed his subordinated to "Take this crackdown as the top project," and "to preëmpt the enemy, to strike at the outset." Following a meeting with Xi in Beijing Chen Quanguo held a rally in Ürümqi with ten thousand troops, helicopters, and armored vehicles. As they paraded he announced a "smashing, obliterating offensive," and declared that they would "bury the corpses of terrorists and terror gangs in the vast sea of the People's War."

Chinese authorities have operated re-education camps to indoctrinate Uyghurs and other Muslims as part of the People's War since at least 2017. The camps have been criticized by a number of governments and human-rights organizations for patterns of abuse and mistreatment, with various characterizations up to and including that of a genocide being perpetrated by the Chinese government. In 2020, CCP General Secretary Xi Jinping said: "Practice has proven that the party's strategy for governing Xinjiang in the new era is completely correct."

In 2021, authorities sentenced Sattar Sawut and Shirzat Bawudun—former heads of Xinjiang's education and justice departments respectively—both to death with a two-year reprieve on separatism and bribery charges. Such a sentence is usually commuted to life imprisonment. Officials said Sawut was found guilty of incorporating ethnic separatism, violence, and religious extremism content into Uyghur-language textbooks, which had influenced several people to participate in attacks in Ürümqi. They said Bawudun was found guilty of colluding with ETIM and carrying out "illegal religious activities at his daughter's wedding". Three other educators were sentenced to life in prison. Chen was replaced as Community Party Secretary for Xinjiang by Ma Xingrui in December 2021.

Xi Jinping made a four-day visit to Xinjiang in July 2022 where Kompas TV had documented groups of Uyghurs welcoming his arrival. Xi called on local officials to do more in preserving ethnic minority culture and following an inspection of the Xinjiang Production and Construction Corps, he praised the organization's "great progress" in reform and development. During another visit to Xinjiang in August 2023, Xi said in a speech that the region should open up more for tourism to attract domestic and foreign visitors.

In April 2026, the government of Xinjiang announced the establishment of new county named Caohu.

== Administrative divisions ==
Xinjiang is divided into thirteen prefecture-level divisions: four prefecture-level cities, six prefectures and five autonomous prefectures (including the sub-provincial autonomous prefecture of Ili, which in turn has two of the seven prefectures within its jurisdiction) for Mongol, Kazakh, Kyrgyz and Hui minorities.

These are then divided into 13 districts, 29 county-level cities, 62 counties and 6 autonomous counties. Twelve of the county-level cities do not belong to any prefecture and are de facto administered by the Xinjiang Production and Construction Corps (XPCC). Sub-level divisions of the Xinjiang Uygur Autonomous Region is shown in the adjacent picture and described in the table below:

Administrative divisions of Xinjiang
Division code	Division	Area in km^{2}	Population 2020	Seat	Divisions			
Division code	Division	Area in km^{2}	Population 2020	Seat	Districts	Counties	Aut. counties	CL cities
650000	Xinjiang Uygur Autonomous Region	1,664,900.00	25,852,345	Ürümqi City	13	62	6	29
650100	Ürümqi City	13,787.90	4,054,369	Tianshan District	7	1		
650200	Karamay City	8,654.08	490,348	Karamay District	4			
650400	Turpan City	67,562.91	693,988	Gaochang District	1	2		
650500	Hami City	142,094.88	673,383	Yizhou District	1		1	1
652300	Changji Hui Autonomous Prefecture	73,139.75	1,613,585	Changji City		4	1	2
652700	Bortala Mongol Autonomous Prefecture	24,934.33	488,198	Bole City		2		2
652800	Bayingolin Mongol Autonomous Prefecture	470,954.25	1,613,979	Korla City		7	1	1
652900	Aksu Prefecture	127,144.91	2,714,422	Aksu City		7		2
653000	Kizilsu Kyrgyz Autonomous Prefecture	72,468.08	622,222	Artux City		3		1
653100	Kashgar Prefecture	137,578.51	4,496,377	Kashi City		10	1	1
653200	Hotan Prefecture	249,146.59	2,504,718	Hotan City		9		1
654000	Ili Kazakh Autonomous Prefecture	56,381.53 *	2,848,393 *	Yining City		7 *	1 *	3 *
654200	Tacheng Prefecture*	94,698.18	1,138,638	Tacheng City		4	1	3
654300	Altay Prefecture*	117,699.01	668,587	Altay City		6		1
659000	Xinjiang Production and Construction Corps	13,055.57	1,573,931	Ürümqi City				12
659001	Shihezi city (8th Division)	456.84	498,587	Hongshan Subdistrict				1
659002	Aral city (1st Division)	5,266.00	328,241	Jinyinchuan Road Subdistrict				1
659003	Tumxuk city (3rd Division)	2,003.00	263,245	Jinxiu Subdistrict				1
659004	Wujiaqu city (6th Division)	742.00	141,065	Renmin Road Subdistrict				1
659005	Beitun city (10th Division)	910.50	20,414	Beitun Town (Altay)				1
659006	Tiemenguan city (2nd Division)	590.27	104,746	Xingjiang Road, 29th Regiment				1
659007	Shuanghe city (5th Division)	742.18	54,731	Hongxing No.2 Road, 89th Regiment				1
659008	Kokdala city (4th Division)	979.71	69,524	Xinfu Road, 66th Regiment				1
659009	Kunyu city (14th Division)	687.13	63,487	Yuyuan Town				1
659010	Huyanghe city (7th Division)	677.94	29,891	Gongqing Town				1
659011	Xinxing city (13th Division)	593.00	44,700	Huangtian Town				1
659012	Baiyang city (9th Division)	4,928.00	85,655	163rd Regiment of the 9th Division				1
Sub-provincial prefecture Xinjiang Production and Construction Corps cities * – Altay Prefecture or Tacheng Prefecture are subordinate to Ili Prefecture. / The population or area figures of Ili do not include Altay Prefecture or Tacheng Prefecture which are subordinate to Ili Prefecture.

Administrative divisions in Uyghur, Chinese and varieties of romanizations
English	Uyghur	SASM / GNC Uyghur Pinyin	Chinese	Pinyin
Xinjiang Uygur Autonomous Region	شىنجاڭ ئۇيغۇر ئاپتونوم رايونى	Xinjang Uyĝur Aptonom Rayoni	新疆维吾尔自治区	Xīnjiāng Wéiwú'ěr Zìzhìqū
Ürümqi city	ئۈرۈمچى شەھىرى	Ürümqi Xäĥiri	乌鲁木齐市	Wūlǔmùqí Shì
Karamay city	قاراماي شەھىرى	K̂aramay Xäĥiri	克拉玛依市	Kèlāmǎyī Shì
Turpan city	تۇرپان شەھىرى	Turpan Xäĥiri	吐鲁番市	Tǔlǔfān Shì
Hami city	قۇمۇل شەھىرى	K̂umul Xäĥiri	哈密市	Hāmì Shì
Changji Hui Autonomous Prefecture	سانجى خۇيزۇ ئاپتونوم ئوبلاستى	Sanji Huyzu Aptonom Oblasti	昌吉回族自治州	Chāngjí Huízú Zìzhìzhōu
Bortala Mongol Autonomous Prefecture	بۆرتالا موڭغۇل ئاپتونوم ئوبلاستى	Börtala Mongĝul Aptonom Oblasti	博尔塔拉蒙古自治州	Bó'ěrtǎlā Měnggǔ Zìzhìzhōu
Bayingolin Mongol Autonomous Prefecture	بايىنغولىن موڭغۇل ئاپتونوم ئوبلاستى	Bayinĝolin Mongĝul Aptonom Oblasti	巴音郭楞蒙古自治州	Bāyīnguōlèng Měnggǔ Zìzhìzhōu
Aksu Prefecture	ئاقسۇ ۋىلايىتى	Ak̂su Vilayiti	阿克苏地区	Ākèsū Dìqū
Kizilsu Kirghiz Autonomous Prefecture	قىزىلسۇ قىرغىز ئاپتونوم ئوبلاستى	K̂izilsu K̂irĝiz Aptonom Oblasti	克孜勒苏柯尔克孜自治州	Kèzīlèsū Kē'ěrkèzī Zìzhìzhōu
Kashi Prefecture	قەشقەر ۋىلايىتى	K̂äxk̂är Vilayiti	喀什地区	Kāshí Dìqū
Hotan Prefecture	خوتەن ۋىلايىتى	Hotän Vilayiti	和田地区	Hétián Dìqū
Ili Kazakh Autonomous Prefecture	ئىلى قازاق ئاپتونوم ئوبلاستى	Ili K̂azak̂ Aptonom Oblasti	伊犁哈萨克自治州	Yīlí Hāsàkè Zìzhìzhōu
Tacheng Prefecture	تارباغاتاي ۋىلايىتى	Tarbaĝatay Vilayiti	塔城地区	Tǎchéng Dìqū
Altay Prefecture	ئالتاي ۋىلايىتى	Altay Vilayiti	阿勒泰地区	Ālètài Dìqū
Shihezi city	شىخەنزە شەھىرى	Xihänzä Xäĥiri	石河子市	Shíhézǐ Shì
Aral city	ئارال شەھىرى	Aral Xäĥiri	阿拉尔市	Ālā'ěr Shì
Tumxuk city	تۇمشۇق شەھىرى	Tumxuk̂ Xäĥiri	图木舒克市	Túmùshūkè Shì
Wujiaqu city	ۋۇجياچۈ شەھىرى	Vujyaqü Xäĥiri	五家渠市	Wǔjiāqú Shì
Beitun city	بەيتۈن شەھىرى	Bäatün Xäĥiri	北屯市	Běitún Shì
Tiemenguan city	باشئەگىم شەھىرى	Baxägym Xäĥiri	铁门关市	Tiĕménguān Shì
Shuanghe city	قوشئۆگۈز شەھىرى	K̂oxögüz Xäĥiri	双河市	Shuānghé Shì
Kokdala city	كۆكدالا شەھىرى	Kökdala Xäĥiri	可克达拉市	Kěkèdálā Shì
Kunyu city	قۇرۇمقاش شەھىرى	Kurumkax XCĥiri	昆玉市	Kūnyù Shì
Huyanghe city	خۇياڭخې شەھىرى	Huyanghê Xäĥiri	胡杨河市	Húyánghé Shì
Xinxing city	يېڭى يۇلتۇز شەھىرى	Yëngi Yultuz Xäĥiri	新星市	Xīnxīng Shì
Baiyang city	بەيياڭ شەھىرى	Bäyyang Xäĥiri	白杨市	BaíYáng Shì

Population by urban areas of prefecture & county cities
#	Cities	2020 Urban area	2010 Urban area	2020 City proper
1	Ürümqi	3,864,136	2,853,398	4,054,369
2	Yining	654,726	368,813	part of Ili Prefecture
3	Korla	490,961	425,182	part of Bayingolin Prefecture
4	Karamay	481,249	353,299	490,348
5	Aksu	470,601	284,872	part of Aksu Prefecture
6	Shihezi	461,663	313,768	498,587
7	Changji	451,234	303,938	part of Changji Prefecture
8	Hami	426,072	310,500 (Note: Hami Prefecture is currently known as Hami PLC after 2010 census; Hami CLC is currently known as Yizhou after 2010 census.)	673,383
9	Kashi	392,730	310,448	part of Kashi Prefecture
10	Hotan	293,056	119,804	part of Hotan Prefecture
11	Kuqa	262,771	(Note: Kuqa County is currently known as Kuqa CLC after 2010 census.)	part of Aksu Prefecture
12	Aral	239,647	65,175	328,241
13	Kuytun	224,471	20,805	part of Ili Prefecture
14	Bole	177,536	120,138	part of Bortala Prefecture
15	Usu	156,437	131,661	part of Tacheng Prefecture
(16)	Shawan	150,317 (Note: Shawan County is currently known as Shawan CLC after 2020 census.)		part of Tacheng Prefecture
17	Altay	147,301	112,711	part of Altay Prefecture
18	Turpan	143,456	89,719 (Note: Turpan Prefecture is currently known as Turpan PLC after 2010 census; Turpan CLC is currently known as Gaochang after 2010 census.)	693,988
19	Tumxuk	128,056	34,808	263,245
20	Fukang	125,080	67,598	part of Changji Prefecture
21	Tacheng	122,447	75,122	part of Tacheng Prefecture
22	Wujiaqu	118,893	75,088	141,065
23	Artux	105,855	58,427	part of Kizilsu Prefecture
(24)	Baiyang	85,655 (Note: Baiyang CLC was established from parts of Tachang CLC after 2020 census.)		85,655
25	Tiemenguan	77,969	(Note: Tiemenguan CLC was established from parts of Korla CLC after 2010 census.)	104,746
26	Korgas	44,701	(Note: Korgas CLC was established from parts of Huocheng County after 2010 census.)	part of Ili Prefecture
(27)	Xinxing	44,700 (Note: Xinxing CLC was established from parts of Yizhou District after 2020 census.)		44,700
28	Shuanghe	43,263	(Note: Shuanghe CLC was established from parts of Bole CLC after 2010 census.)	54,731
29	Kokdala	39,257	(Note: Kokdala CLC was established from parts of Huocheng County after 2010 census.)	69,524
30	Kunyu	32,591	(Note: Kunyu CLC was established from parts of Hotan County, Pishan County, Moyu County, & Qira County after 2010 census.)	63,487
32	Huyanghe	24,769	(Note: Huyanghe CLC was established from parts of Usu CLC after 2010 census.)	29,891
32	Beitun	13,874	(Note: Beitun CLC was established from parts of Altay CLC after 2010 census.)	20,414
33	Alashankou	11,097	(Note: Alashankou CLC was established from parts of Bole CLC & Jinghe County after 2010 census.)	part of Bortala Prefecture

== Geography and geology ==
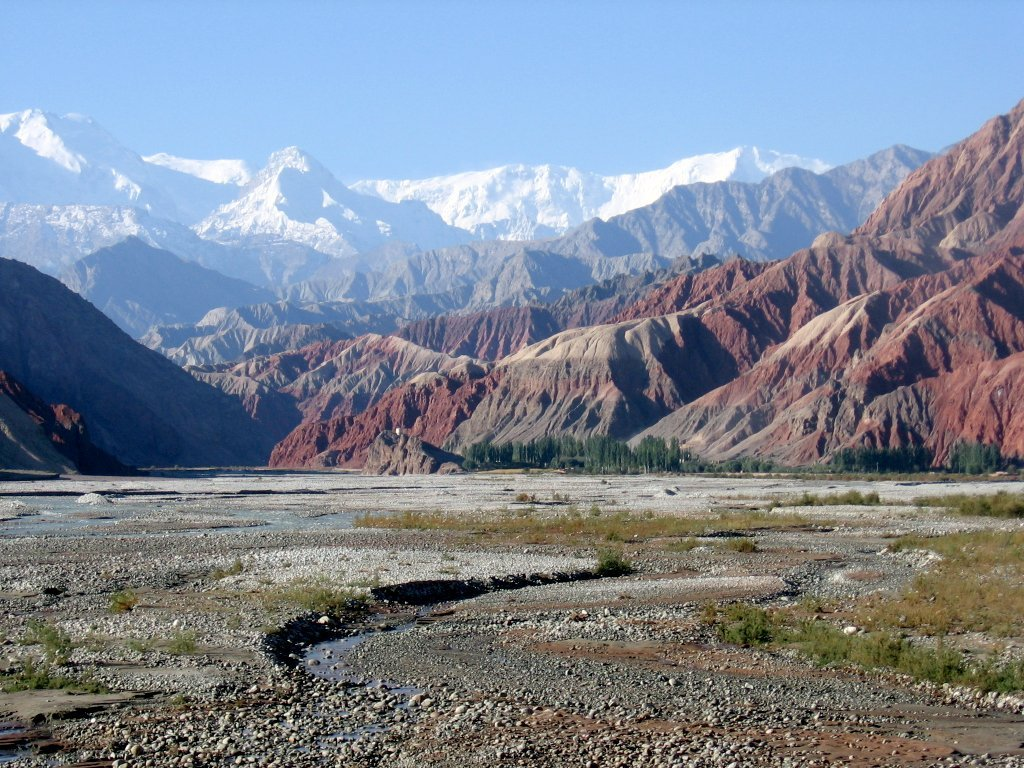
Close to Karakoram Highway in Xinjiang.

Xinjiang is the largest political subdivision of China, accounting for more than one sixth of China's total territory and a quarter of its boundary length. Xinjiang is mostly covered with uninhabitable deserts and dry grasslands, with dotted oases conducive to habitation accounting for 9.7 percent of Xinjiang's total area by 2015 at the foot of Tian Shan, Kunlun Mountains and Altai Mountains, respectively.

=== Mountain systems and basins ===
Xinjiang is split by the Tian Shan mountain range (تەڭرى تاغ, Tengri Tagh, Тәңри Тағ), which divides it into two large basins: the Dzungarian Basin in the north and the Tarim Basin in the south. A small V-shaped wedge between these two major basins, limited by the Tian Shan's main range in the south and the Borohoro Mountains in the north, is the basin of the Ili River, which flows into Kazakhstan's Lake Balkhash; an even smaller wedge farther north is the Emin Valley.

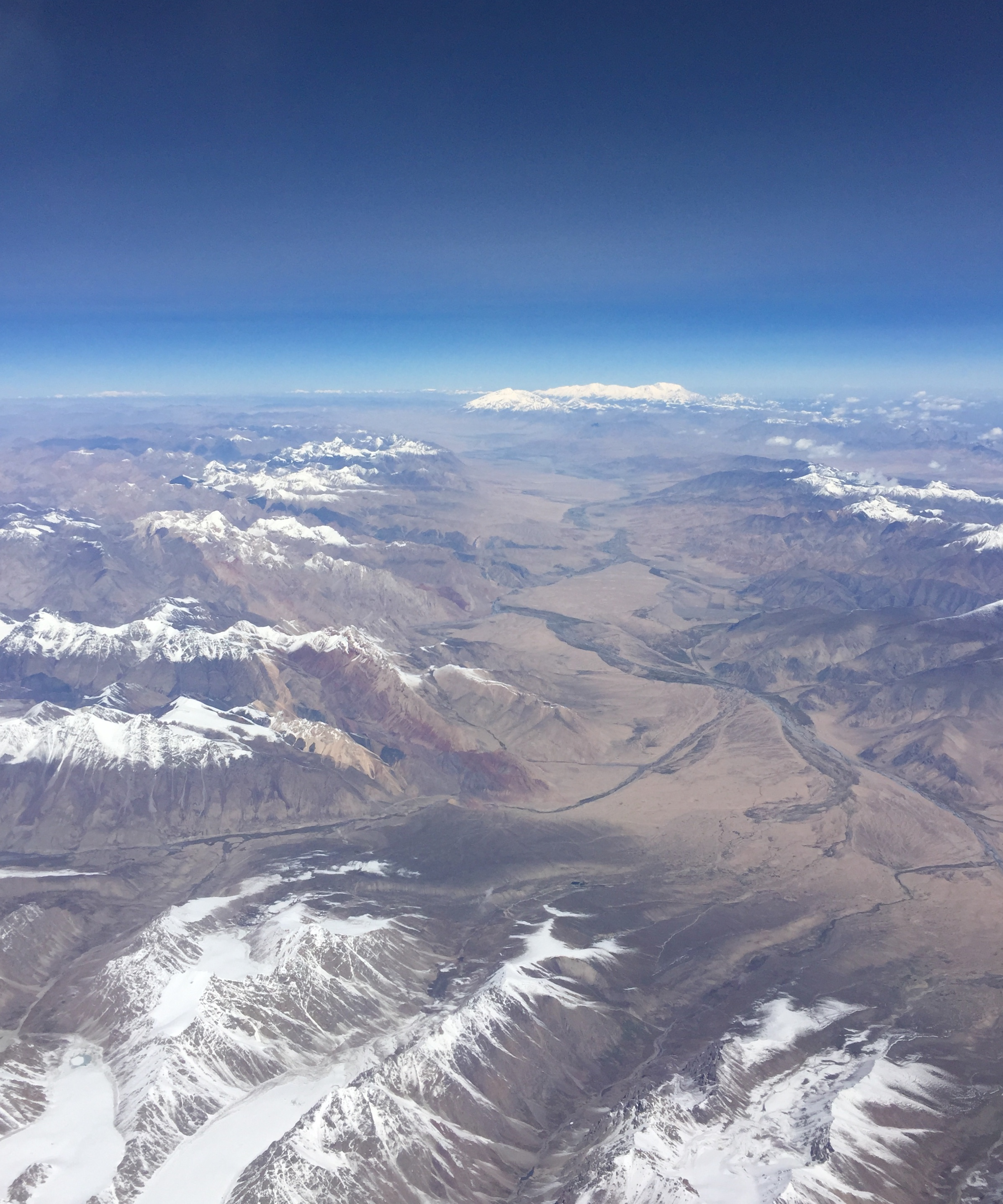
Pamir Mountains and Muztagh Ata.

Other major mountain ranges of Xinjiang include the Pamir Mountains and Karakoram in the southwest, the Kunlun Mountains in the south (along the border with Tibet) and the Altai Mountains in the northeast (shared with Mongolia). The region's highest point is the mountain K2, an eight-thousander located 8,611 meters (28,251 ft) above sea level in the Karakoram Mountains on the border with Pakistan.

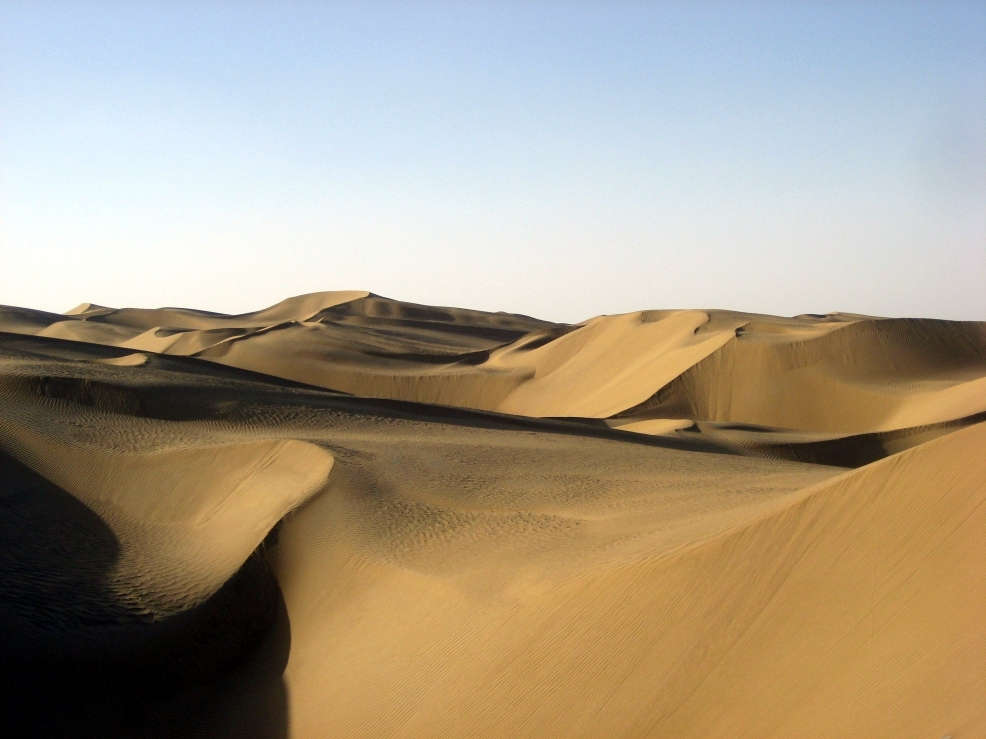
Taklamakan Desert

Much of the Tarim Basin is dominated by the Taklamakan Desert. North of it is the Turpan Depression, which contains the lowest point in Xinjiang and in the entire PRC, at 155 meters (509 ft) below sea level.

The Dzungarian Basin is slightly cooler, and receives somewhat more precipitation, than the Tarim Basin. Nonetheless, it, too, has a large Gurbantünggüt Desert (also known as Dzoosotoyn Elisen) in its center.

The Tian Shan mountain range marks the Xinjiang-Kyrgyzstan border at the Torugart Pass (3752 m). The Karakorum highway (KKH) links Islamabad, Pakistan with Kashgar over the Khunjerab Pass.

=== Mountain passes ===
From south to north, the mountain passes bordering Xinjiang are:

Mountain passes bordering Xinjiang
山口	Mountain Pass	Coordinate	Elev.	Appendix
喀喇昆仑山口	Karakoram Pass	35.513333°N 77.823056°E	5540m	-
图尔吉斯坦拉山口	Turkistan La Pass	35.656667°N 76.860556°E		-
Windy Gap	Windy Gap	35.87318°N 76.57692°E	6111m	-
木斯塔山口	Mustagh Pass	35.840000°N 76.250000°E	5422m	-
Sarpo Laggo Pass	Sarpo Laggo Pass	35.8234°N 76.16249°E	6013m	-
West Muztagh pass	West Muztagh pass	35.8532°N 76.1424°E		-
红其拉甫口岸	Khunjerab Pass	36.850000°N 75.427778°E	4693m	-
Parpik Pass	Parpik Pass	36.95°N 75.35°E	5467m	-
Mutsjliga Pass	Mutsjliga Pass	36.97374°N 75.2973°E	5314m	-
明铁盖达坂	Mintaka Pass	37.0039°N 74.8511°E	4709m	-
基里克达坂	Kilik Pass	37.0792°N 74.6722°E	4827m	-
瓦根基达坂	Wakhjir Pass	37.098°N 74.4848°E	4837 m	-
Kara Jilga Pass	Kara Jilga Pass	37.2545°N 74.6147°E	5386m	-
麦曼约里达坂	Mihman Yoli Pass	37.28395°N 74.7328°E	4937m	-
托克满苏达坂	Tegermansu Pass	37.2236°N 74.8744°E	5427m	-
克克敖吊克达坂 别伊克山口 排依克山口	Beyik Pass	37.3°N 75.0°E	4742m	-
纳兹塔什山口 奈扎塔什山隘	Nezatash Pass	37.58944°N 74.93611°E	4476m	-
Agachak Pass	Agachak Pass	37.82115°N 74.94492°E	5127m	-
卡拉苏口岸 阔勒买口岸	Kulma Pass	38.1498°N 74.8038°E	4362m	-
Saritosh Pass	Saritosh Pass	38.27694°N 74.80111°E	4538m	-
Qaratokhterak Pass	Qaratokhterak Pass	38.42833°N 74.86722°E	4877m	-
Aromiti Pass	Aromiti Pass	38.62833°N 74.48472°E	4703m	-
Budabel Pass	Budabel Pass	38.57556°N 74.07222°E	4251m	-
Kiyaz-Ashu	Kiyaz-Ashu	38.53333°N 74.0°E	4479m	-
乌孜别里山口	Uzbel-Pass	38.653806°N 73.8023917°E	5540m	-
Qarazoq Pass	Qarazoq Pass	38.85°N 73.71194°E	5217m	-
Uch-Bel Pass	Uch-Bel Pass	37.82115°N 74.94492°E	5127m	-
Togochar Pass	Togochar Pass	39.56447°N 73.91435°E	4361m	-
Karachaychaty Pass	Karachaychaty Pass	39.59439°N 73.92407°E	4284m	-
斯姆哈纳 伊尔克什坦口岸	Erkeshtam	39.7172°N 73.9735°E	3005m	-
Kashetek Pass	Kashetek Pass	39.72847°N 73.91437°E	3120m	-
Bezymyannyy Pass	Bezymyannyy Pass	39.74686°N 73.89173°E	3306m	-
Tupik Pass	Tupik Pass	39.74583°N 73.88416°E	3299m	-
Vorota Pass	Vorota Pass	39.75665°N 73.86167°E	3604m	-
Il'tyk Pass	Il'tyk Pass	39.7647°N 73.8388°E	3836m	-
Kara-Bel' Pass	Kara-Bel' Pass	39.8652°N 73.89535°E	3863m	-
Ityk Pass	Ityk Pass	39.9114°N 73.91068°E	4133m	-
Dungurama Pass	Dungurama Pass	40.01417°N 73.96673°E	4067m	-
Karachalsu Pass	Karachalsu Pass	40.04483°N 73.97866°E	4201m	-
Muzbel' Pass	Muzbel' Pass	40.08405°N 74.01892°E	4507m	-
Achiktash Pass	Achiktash Pass	40.0807°N 74.0658°E	4191m	-
Kyz-Dar Pass	Kyz-Dar Pass	40.10652°N 74.11892°E	4246m	-
Kurumdu Pass	Kurumdu Pass	40.11038°N 74.1286°E	4369m	-
Tart-Kul' Pass	Tart-Kul' Pass	40.1134°N 74.2698°E	3786m	-
Shuralu-Davan Pass	Shuralu-Davan Pass	40.26928°N 74.58181°E	3875m	-
Tata Pass	Tata Pass	40.1359°N 74.4161°E	4036m	-
Sulyuktur Pass	Sulyuktur Pass	40.08974°N 74.09467°E	4086m	-
Talgyy Pass	Talgyy Pass	40.21973°N 74.5368°E	3672m	-
Kalmak-Ashu Pass	Kalmak-Ashu Pass	40.28128°N 74.61626°E	3581m	-
Tuz-Ashu Pass	Tuz-Ashu Pass	40.27238°N 74.6524°E	3625m	-
Dzhetimashu Pass	Dzhetimashu Pass	40.42097°N 74.81503°E	3838m	-
苏约克山口	Borgun Pass	40.46778°N 74.81406°E	3945m	-
吐尔尕特山口	Torugart Pass	40.5517°N 75.3939°E	3752m	-
Uselek Pass	Uselek Pass	40.63374°N 75.5207°E	3638m	-
Chokolay Pass	Chokolay Pass	40.59985°N 75.62223°E	3841m	-
Saryiymek Pass	Saryiymek Pass	40.47055°N 75.72222°E	3820m	-
Ortosu Pass	Ortosu Pass	40.3261°N 75.82059°E	3903m	-
Terekty Pass	Terekty Pass	40.30978°N 75.85505°E	3908m	-
Kurpe-Bel' Pass	Kurpe-Bel' Pass	40.37611°N 75.96578°E	3667m	-
Buzaygyr Pass	Buzaygyr Pass	40.36648°N 76.00256°E	3783m	-
Khodzhent Pass	Khodzhent Pass	40.41093°N 76.282°E	3955m	-
Yerteke Pass	Yerteke Pass	40.34612°N 76.33113°E	3780m	-
Tuyukkhodzhent Pass	Tuyukkhodzhent Pass	40.38185°N 76.36949°E	3780m	-
Kurumduk Pass	Kurumduk Pass	40.41196°N 76.45904°E	3822m	-
Karabel' Pervyy Pass	Karabel' Pervyy Pass	40.42914°N 76.50312°E	4091m	-
Karabel' Vtoroy Pass	Karabel' Vtoroy Pass	40.47805°N 76.53704°E	4083m	-
Aksaybel' Pass	Aksaybel' Pass	40.56114°N 76.56965°E	4186m	-
Tuyukbel' Pass	Tuyukbel' Pass	40.64156°N 76.6497°E	4091m	-
别迭里山口	Bedel Pass	41.4114°N 78.4131°E	4284m	-
Chonteren Pass	Chonteren Pass	42.04934°N 80.21078°E	5331m	-
Bysokiy Pass	Bysokiy Pass	42.07022°N 80.21003°E	5435m	-
阿拉山口市	Alashankou	45.2°N 82.6°E	291m	Border

=== Geology ===
Xinjiang is geologically young. Collision of the Indian and the Eurasian plates formed the Tian Shan, Kunlun Shan, and Pamir mountain ranges; said tectonics render it a very active earthquake zone. Older geological formations are located in the far north, where Kazakhstania is geologically part of Kazakhstan, and in the east, where is part of the North China Craton.

=== Center of the continent ===
Xinjiang has within its borders, in the Gurbantünggüt Desert, the location in Eurasia that is furthest from the sea in any direction (a continental pole of inaccessibility): 46°16.8′N 86°40.2′E. It is at least 2,647 km (1,645 mi) (straight-line distance) from any coastline.

In 1992, local geographers determined another point within Xinjiang – 43°40′52″N 87°19′52″E in the southwestern suburbs of Ürümqi, Ürümqi County – to be the "center point of Asia". A monument to this effect was then erected there and the site has become a local tourist attraction.

=== Rivers and lakes ===
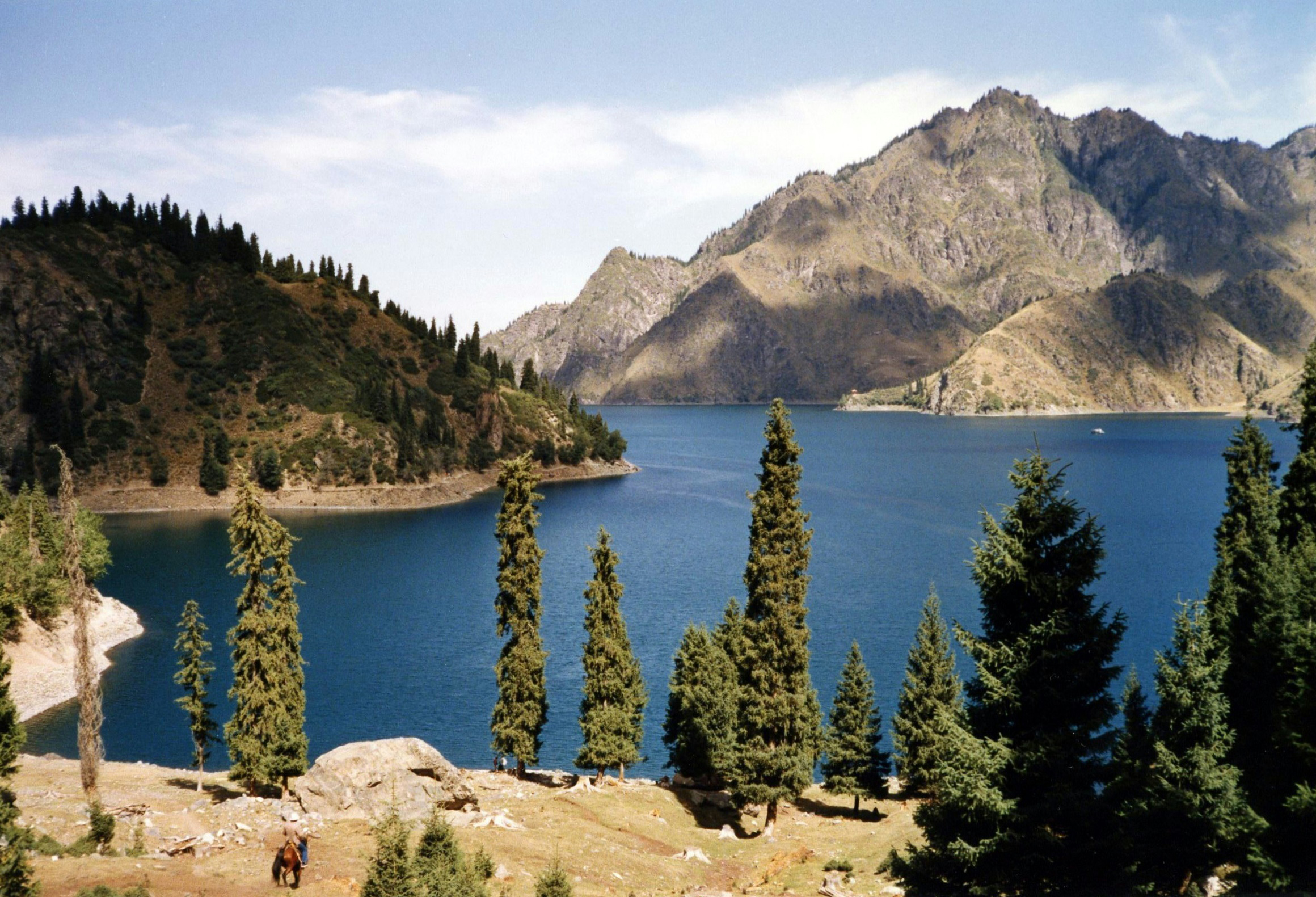
Tianchi Lake

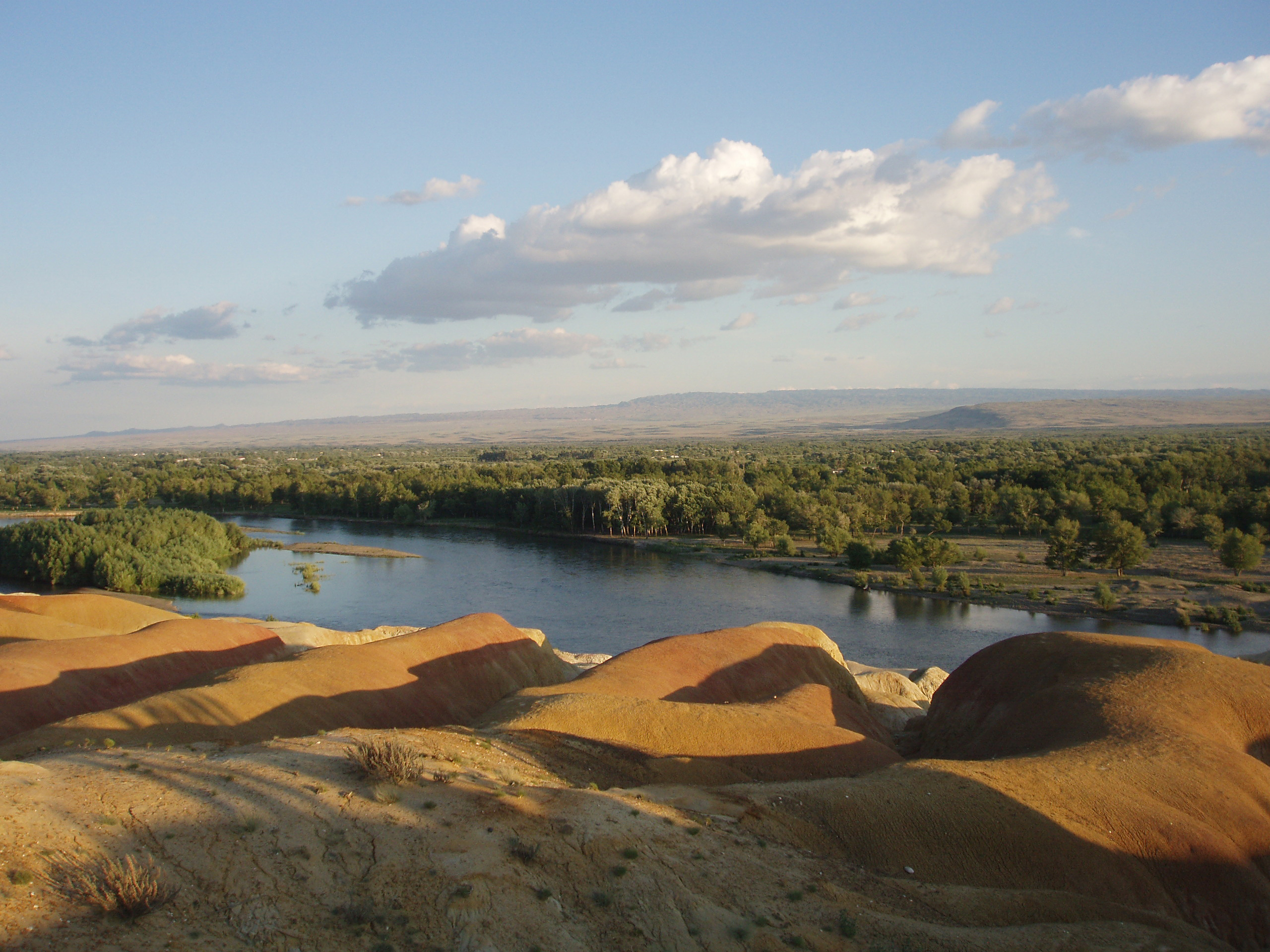
Black Irtysh river in Burqin County is a famous spot for sightseeing.

Having hot summer and low precipitation, most of Xinjiang is endorheic. Its rivers either disappear in the desert, or terminate in salt lakes (within Xinjiang itself, or in neighboring Kazakhstan), instead of running towards an ocean. The northernmost part of the region, with the Irtysh River rising in the Altai Mountains, that flows (via Kazakhstan and Russia) toward the Arctic Ocean, is the only exception. But even so, a significant part of the Irtysh's waters were artificially diverted via the Irtysh–Karamay–Ürümqi Canal to the drier regions of southern Dzungarian Basin.

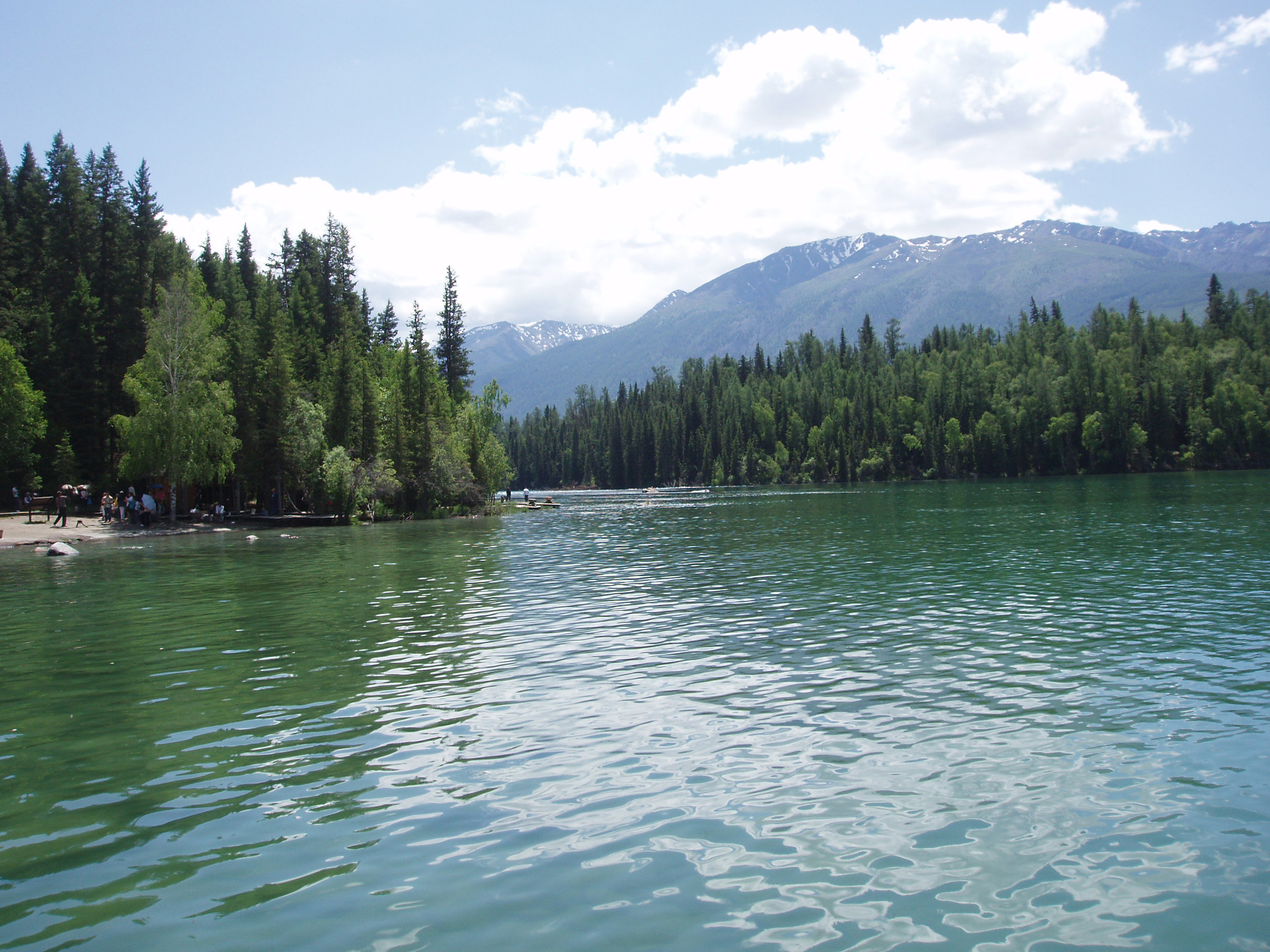
Kanas Lake

Elsewhere, most of Xinjiang's rivers are comparatively short streams fed by the snows of the several ranges of the Tian Shan. Once they enter the populated areas in the mountains' foothills, their waters are extensively used for irrigation, so that the river often disappears in the desert instead of reaching the lake to whose basin it nominally belongs. This is the case even with the main river of the Tarim Basin, the Tarim, which has been dammed at a number of locations along its course, and whose waters have been completely diverted before they can reach the Lop Lake. In the Dzungarian basin, a similar situation occurs with most rivers that historically flowed into Lake Manas. Some of the salt lakes, having lost much of their fresh water inflow, are now extensively use for the production of mineral salts (used e.g., in the manufacturing of potassium fertilizers); this includes the Lop Lake and the Manas Lake.

=== Deserts ===
Deserts include:

- Gurbantünggüt Desert, also known as Dzoosotoyn Elisen
- Taklamakan Desert
- Kumtag Desert, east of Taklamakan

=== Major cities ===
Due to water scarcity, most of Xinjiang's population lives within fairly narrow belts that are stretched along the foothills of the region's mountain ranges in areas conducive to irrigated agriculture. It is in these belts where most of the region's cities are found.

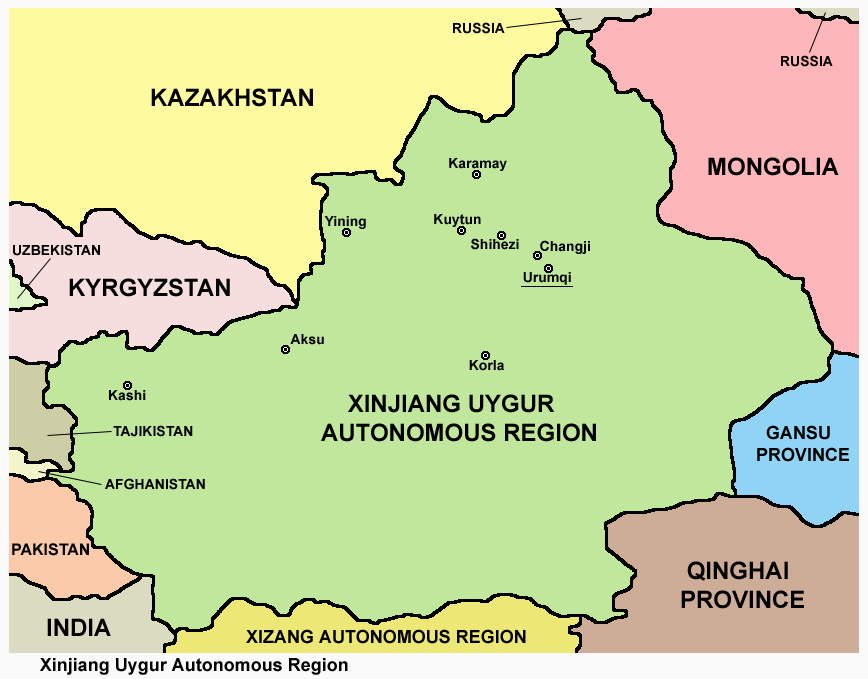
Largest cities and towns of Xinjiang

- Ürümqi
- Turpan
- Kashgar
- Karamay
- Ghulja
- Shihezi
- Hotan
- Artush
- Aksu
- Korla

=== Climate ===
Köppen climate map of Xinjiang

A semiarid or desert climate (Köppen BSk or BWk, respectively) prevails in Xinjiang. The entire region has great seasonal differences in temperature with cold winters. The Turpan Depression often records some of the hottest temperatures nationwide in summer, with air temperatures easily exceeding 40 °C (104 °F). Winter temperatures regularly fall below −20 °C (−4 °F) in the far north and highest mountain elevations. On 18 February 2024, a record low temperature for the region of −52.3 °C (−62.1 °F) was recorded.

Continuous permafrost is typically found in the Tian Shan starting at the elevation of about 3,500–3,700 m above sea level. Discontinuous alpine permafrost usually occurs down to 2,700–3,300 m, but in certain locations, due to the peculiarity of the aspect and the microclimate, it can be found at elevations as low as 2,000 m.

== Time ==
Despite the province's easternmost point being more than 1,600 kilometers (990 mi) west of Beijing, Xinjiang, like the rest of China, is officially in the UTC+8 time zone, known by residents as Beijing Time. Despite this, some residents, local organizations and governments observe UTC+6 as the standard time and refer to this zone as Xinjiang Time. Han people tend to use Beijing Time, while Uyghurs tend to use Xinjiang Time as a form of resistance to Beijing. Time zones notwithstanding, most schools and businesses open and close two hours later than in the other regions of China.

== Politics ==
=== Structure ===
Current leaders of the Xinjiang Regional Government
Title	CCP Committee Secretary	People's Congress Chairwoman	Chairman	Xinjiang CPPCC Chairman
Name	Chen Xiaojiang	Zumret Obul	Erkin Tuniyaz	Nurlan Abilmazhinuly
Born	June 1962 (age 64)	August 1959 (age 67)	November 1961 (age 64–65)	December 1962 (age 63)
Assumed office	July 2025	January 2023	September 2021	January 2023

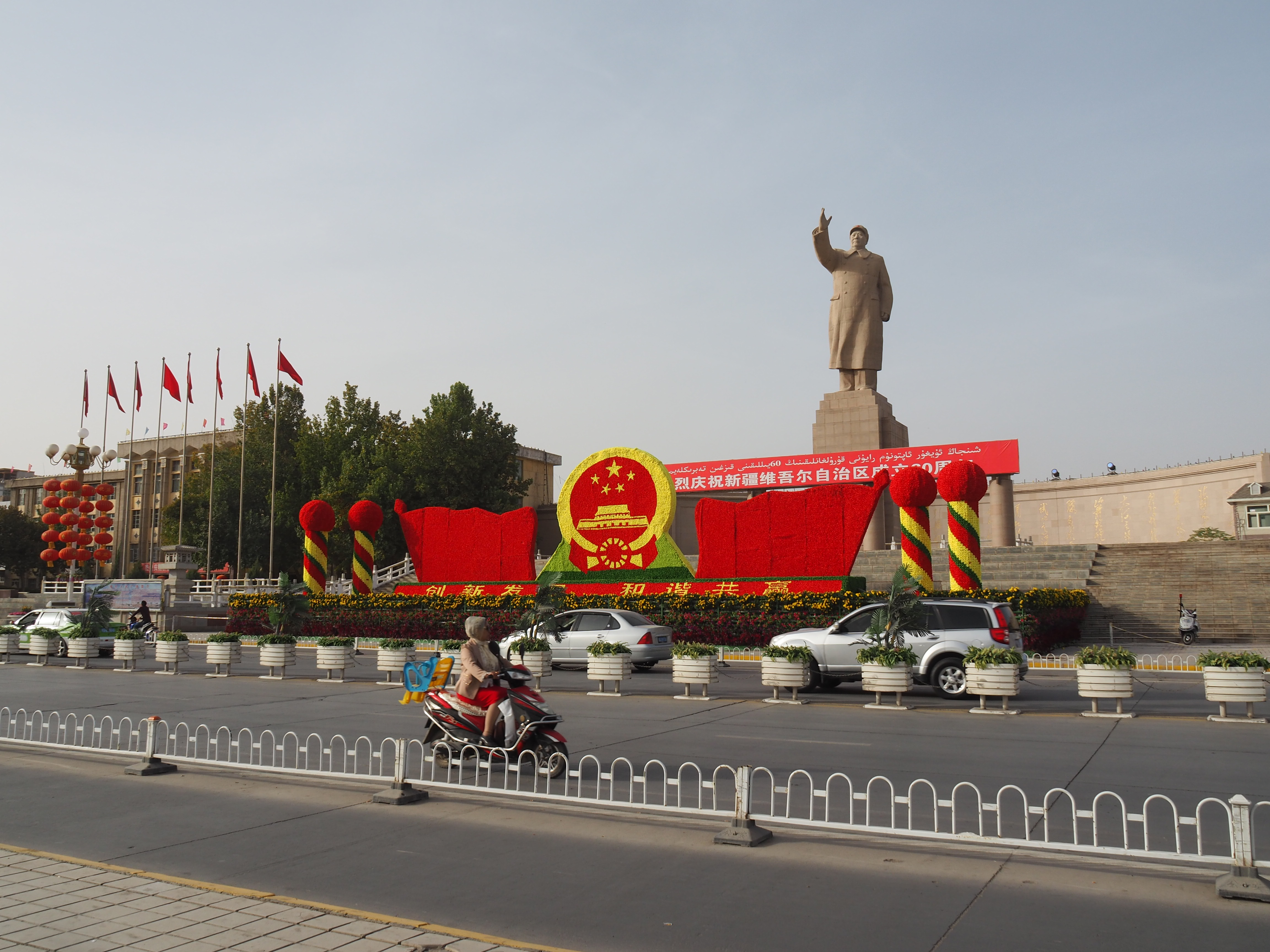
Statue of Mao Zedong in Kashgar

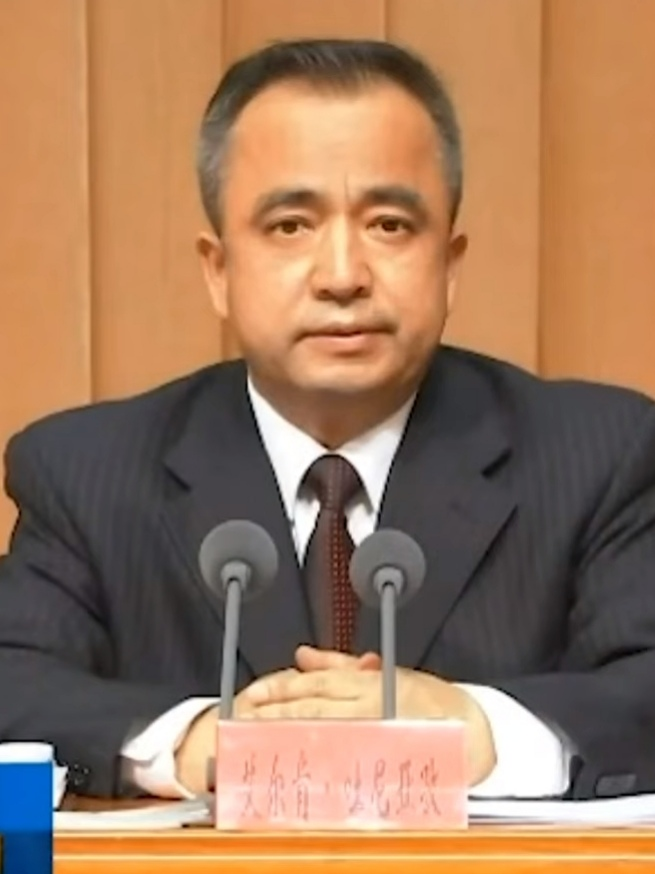
Erkin Tuniyaz, the incumbent Chairman of the Xinjiang Government

Like all governing institutions in mainland China, Xinjiang has a parallel party-government system. The Xinjiang Uygur Autonomous Regional Committee of the CCP acts as the top policy-formulation body, and exercises control over the Regional People's Government. The CCP Committee Secretary, generally a member of the Han ethnic group, outranks the Government Chairman, always an Uyghur. The Government Chairman typically serves as a Deputy Committee Secretary. The central leadership in Beijing formulates policies regarding Xinjiang through the Central Xinjiang Work Coordination Group, which is usually led by the chairman of the Chinese People's Political Consultative Conference.

=== Xinjiang Production and Construction Corps ===
Xinjiang maintains the Xinjiang Production and Construction Corps (XPCC), an economic and paramilitary organization administered by the Chinese government and the Chinese Communist Party (CCP). It plays a critical role in the region's economy, owning or being otherwise connected to many companies in the region as well as dominating Xinjiang's agricultural output. It additionally directly administers cities throughout Xinjiang, mainly concentrated in the northern parts. It is headed by the CCP secretary of Xinjiang, while the CCP secretary of the XPCC is considered the second most powerful person in the region.

=== Poverty alleviation programs ===
Local governments in Xinjiang seek to address ethnic tensions in the region through poverty alleviation and redistributive programs. These efforts include working with state-owned enterprises and private enterprises in the mining sector. For example, during the Targeted Poverty Alleviation Campaign, officials paired 1,000 villages with 1,000 enterprises for economic development projects.

=== Human rights abuses ===
Human Rights Watch has documented "the denial of due legal process and fair trials and failure to hold genuinely open trials as mandated by law," for example in the cases of suspects arrested after ethnic violence in Ürümqi in 2009.

The Chinese government, under Chinese Communist Party general secretary Xi Jinping, launched the Strike Hard Campaign Against Violent Terrorism in 2014. Chinese official sources describe the measures as part of counter-terrorism and vocational education initiatives aimed at preventing extremism, improving employability, and promoting social stability. Independent investigations and international human-rights bodies have concurrently documented mass detention, surveillance, and restrictions on religious and cultural expression, raising concerns over human-rights implications.

According to Chinese government and official reports, Xinjiang has seen significant progress in poverty alleviation, infrastructure development, and social-welfare programs, which officials cite as evidence of improved living standards and social stability. Other researchers and journalists have documented satellite imagery, detainee testimony, and reports of restrictions on cultural and religious activities, highlighting a complex picture of governance and social conditions.

Some observers and institutions describe elements of the campaign as amounting to crimes against humanity or even genocide, whereas Chinese authorities and some commentators reject these characterizations.

=== East Turkestan independence movement ===
The Kök Bayraq has become a symbol of the East Turkestan independence movement.

Some factions in Xinjiang, most prominently Uyghur nationalists, advocate establishing an independent country named East Turkestan (also sometimes called "Uyghuristan"), which has led to tension, conflict, and ethnic strife in the region. Autonomous regions in China do not have a legal right to secede, and each one is considered to be an "inseparable part of the People's Republic of China" by the government. The separatist movement claims that the region is not part of China, but was invaded by the CCP in 1949 and has been under occupation since then. The Chinese government asserts that the region has been part of China since ancient times, and has engaged in "strike hard" campaigns targeted at separatists. The movement has been supported by both militant Islamic extremist groups such as the Turkistan Islamic Party, as well as advocacy groups with no connection to extremist groups.

According to the Asia-Pacific Center for Security Studies, the two main sources for separatism in Xinjiang stem from religion and ethnicity. Religiously, the most Uyghur peoples of Xinjiang follow Islam; in the rest of China, many are Buddhist, Taoist and Confucian, although many follow Islam as well, such as the Hui ethnic subgroup of the Han ethnicity, comprising some 10 million people. Thus, the major difference and source of friction with eastern China is ethnicity and religious doctrinal differences that differentiate them politically from other Muslim minorities elsewhere in the country.

== Economy ==
Development of GDP
Year	GDP in billions of Yuan
1995	82
2000	136
2005	260
2010	544
2015	932
2020	1,380

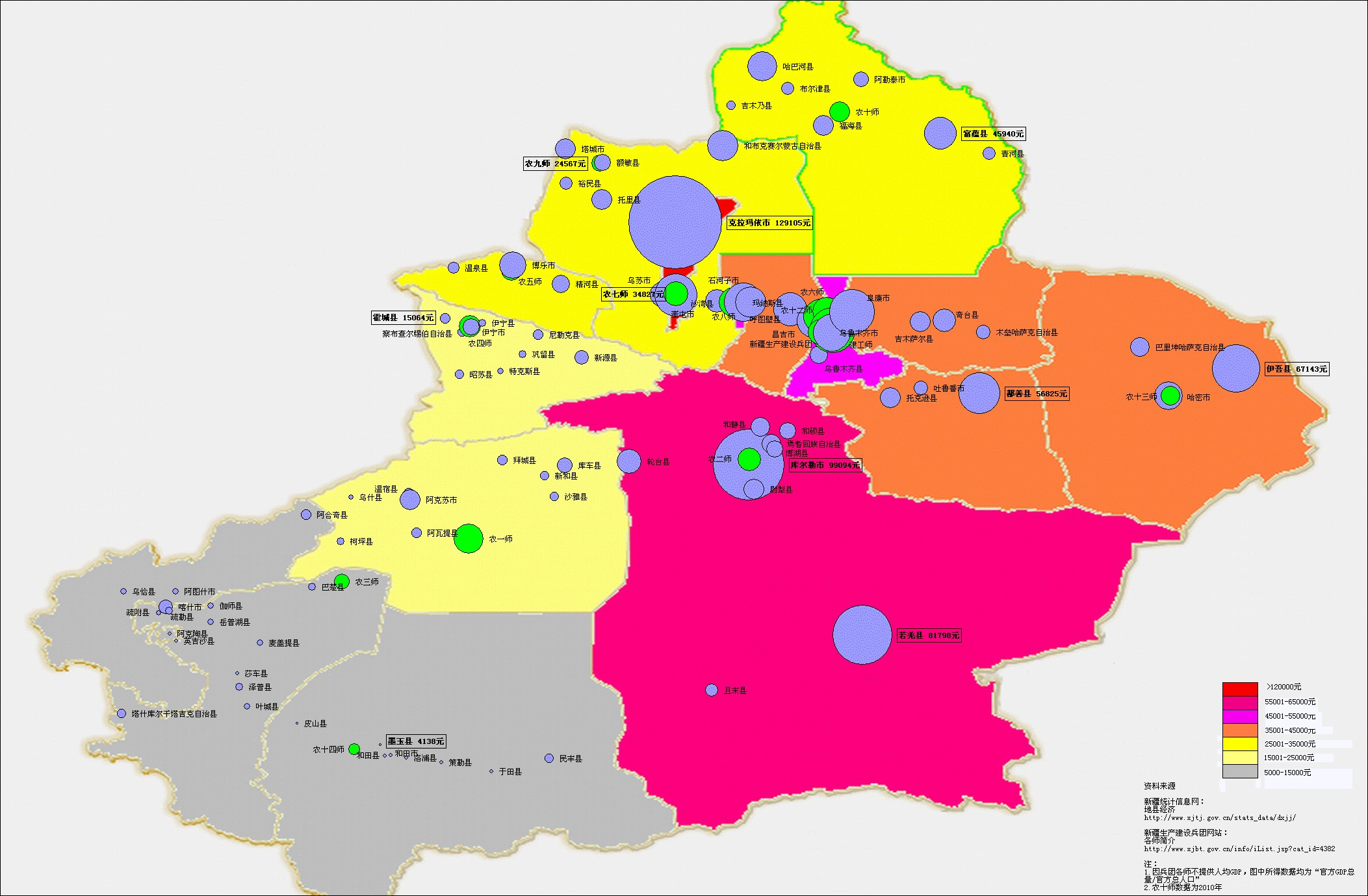
The distribution map of Xinjiang's GDP per person (2011)

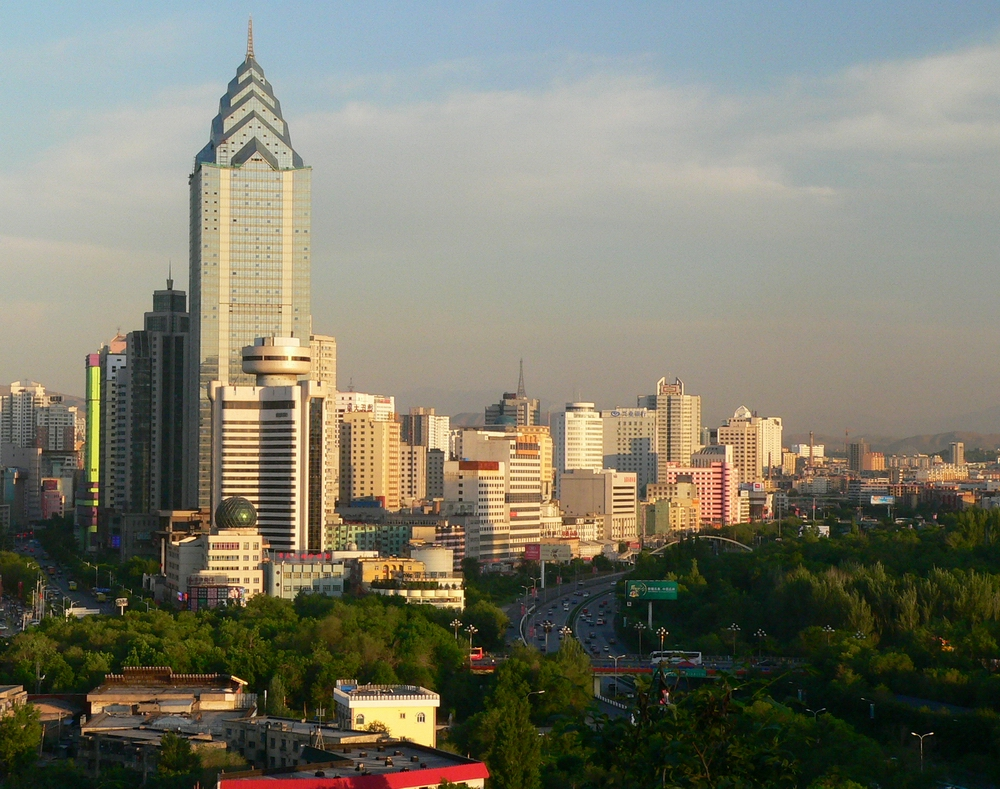
Ürümqi is a major industrial center in Xinjiang.

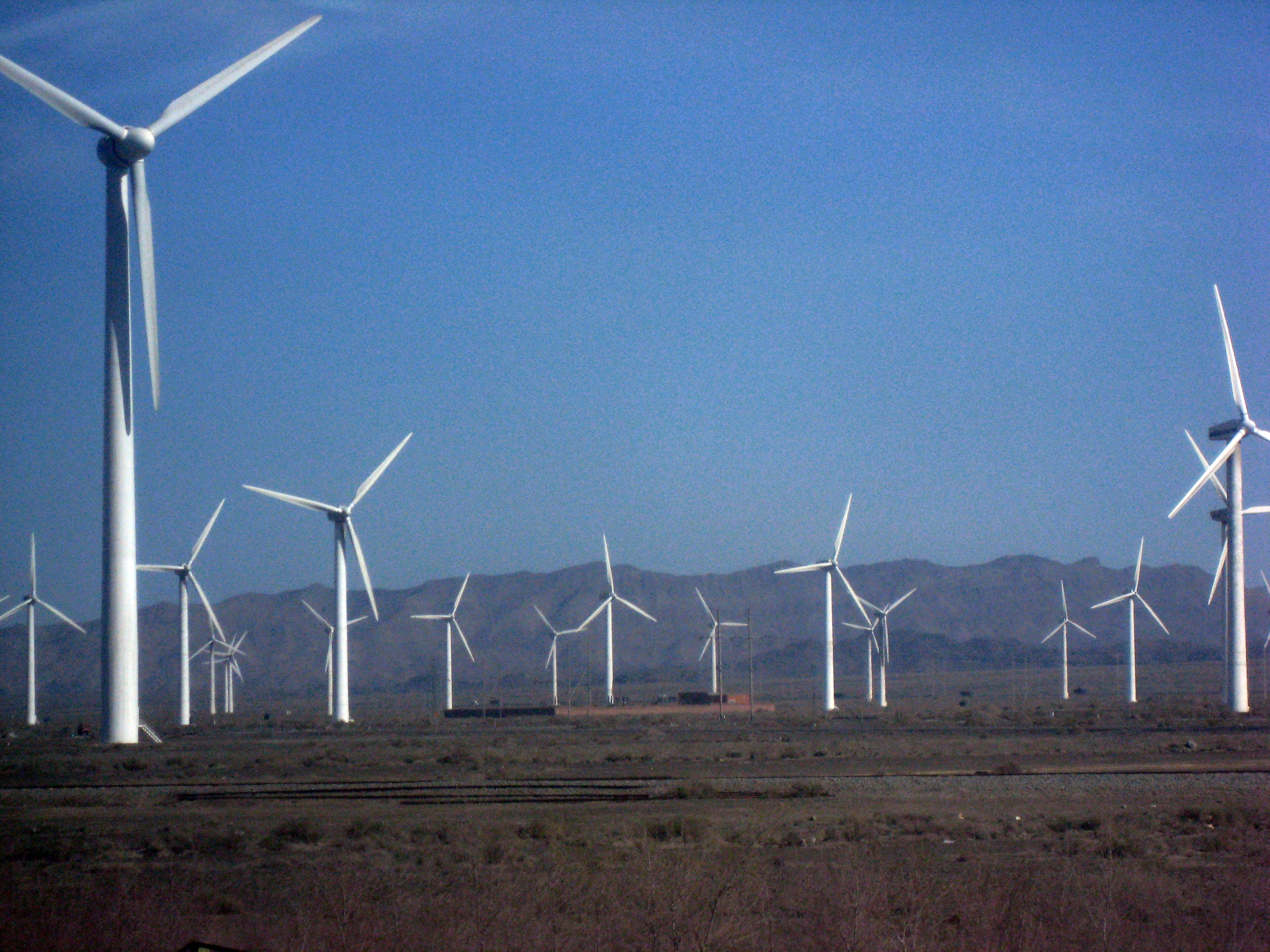
Wind farm in Xinjiang

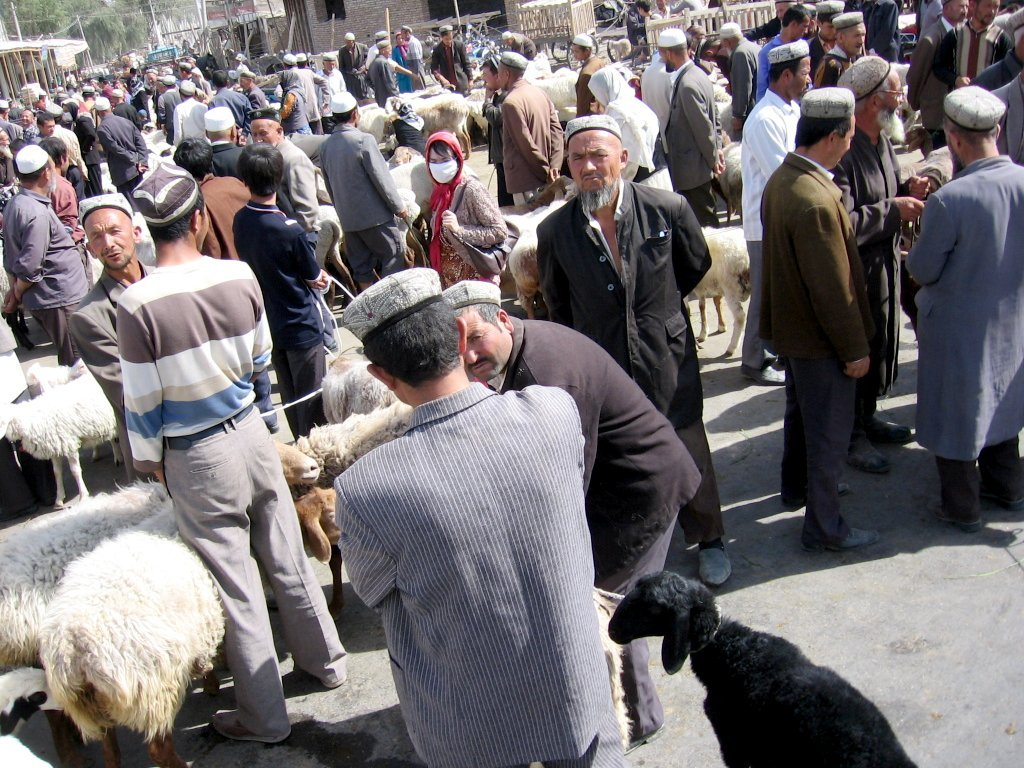
Sunday market in Khotan

The GDP of Xinjiang was about CN¥2.146 trillion (US$300 billion) as of 2025. Economic growth has been fueled by to discovery of the abundant reserves of coal, oil, gas as well as the China Western Development policy introduced by the State Council to boost economic development in Western China. Its per capita GDP for 2025 was CN¥81,577 (US$11,421). Southern Xinjiang, with 95 percent non-Han population, has an average per capita income half that of Xinjiang as a whole. XPCC plays an outsized role in Xinjiang's economy, with the organization producing CN¥350 billion (US$52 billion), or around 19.7% of Xinjiang's economy, while the per capita GDP was CN¥98,748 (US$14,680).

In general, China's autonomous regions have some of the highest per capita government spending public goods and services. Providing public goods and services in these areas is part of a government effort to reduce regional inequalities, reduce what the government views as a risk of separatism, and stimulate economic development. Economic development of Xinjiang is a priority for China. As of at least 2019, Xinjiang is among the regions of China with the highest total per capita government expenditure, including on health care, education, and social security.

In 1997, the 26,000 km Uzbek-Kyrgyz-Chinese highway became operational. In 1998, the Turpan–Ürümqi–Dahuangshan Expressway was completed, linking several key areas in Xinjiang. In 2000, the government articulated its strategy for developing the western regions of the country, and that plan made Xinjiang a major focus. Accelerating development in Xinjiang is intended by China to achieve a number of objectives, including narrowing the economic gap between Xinjiang and the more developed eastern provinces, as well as alleviating political discontent and security problems by alleviating poverty and raising the standard of living in order to increase stability. From 2014 to 2020, fiscal transfers from China's central government to Xinjiang grew by an average of 10.4% per year.

In July 2010, state media outlet China Daily reported that:

Local governments in China's 19 provinces and municipalities, including Beijing, Shanghai, Guangdong, Zhejiang and Liaoning, are engaged in the commitment of "pairing assistance" support projects in Xinjiang to promote the development of agriculture, industry, technology, education and health services in the region.

—

Xinjiang has traditionally been an agricultural region, but is also rich in minerals and oil. Xinjiang is a major producer of solar panel components due to its large production of the base material polysilicon. In 2020 45 percent of global production of solar-grade polysilicon occurred in Xinjiang. Concerns have been raised both within the solar industry and outside it that forced labor may occur in the Xinjiang part of the supply chain. The global solar panel industry is under pressure to move sourcing away from the region due to human rights and liability concerns. China's solar association claimed the allegations were baseless and unfairly stigmatized firms with operations there. A 2021 investigation in the United Kingdom found that 40 percent of solar farms in the UK had been built using panels from Chinese companies linked to forced labor in Xinjiang.

=== Agriculture and fishing ===
Main area is of irrigated agriculture. By 2015, the agricultural land area of the region is 631 thousand km^{2} or 63.1 million ha, of which 6.1 million ha is arable land. In 2016, the total cultivated land rose to 6.2 million ha, with the crop production reaching 15.1 million tons. Agriculture in Xinjiang is dominated by the XPCC, which employs a majority of the organization's workforce. Wheat was the main staple crop of the region, maize grown as well, millet found in the south, while only a few areas (in particular, Aksu) grew rice.

Cotton became an important crop in several oases, notably Hotan, Yarkand and Turpan by the late 19th century. Sericulture is also practiced. The Xinjiang cotton industry is the world's largest cotton exporter, producing 84 percent of Chinese cotton while the country provides 26 percent of global cotton export. Xinjiang also produces peppers and pepper pigments used in cosmetics such lipstick for export.

Xinjiang is famous for its tomatoes, grapes and melons, particularly Hami melons and Turpan raisins. The region is a leading source for tomato paste, which it supplies for international brands.

The main livestock of the region have traditionally been sheep. Much of the region's pasture land is in its northern part, where more precipitation is available, but there are mountain pastures throughout the region.

Due to the lack of access to the ocean and limited amount of inland water, Xinjiang's fish resources are somewhat limited. Nonetheless, there is a significant amount of fishing in Lake Ulungur and Lake Bosten and in the Irtysh River. A large number of fish ponds have been constructed since the 1970s, their total surface exceeding 10,000 hectares by the 1990s. In 2000, the total of 58,835 tons of fish was produced in Xinjiang, 85 percent of which came from aquaculture. The Sayram Lake is both the largest alpine lake and highest altitude lake in Xinjiang, and is the location of a major cold-water fishery. Originally Sayram had no fish but in 1998, northern whitefish (Coregonus peled) from Russia were introduced and investment in breeding infrastructure and technology has consequently made Sayram into the country's largest exporter of northern whitefish with an annual output of over 400 metric tons.

=== Mining and minerals ===
Mining-related industries are a major part of Xinjiang's economy.

Xinjiang was known for producing salt, sodium, borax, gold, and jade in the 19th century.

The Lop Lake was once a large brackish lake during the end of the Pleistocene but has slowly dried up in the Holocene where average annual precipitation in the area has declined to just 31.2 millimeters (1.2 inches), and experiences annual evaporation rate of 2,901 millimeters (114 inches). The area is rich in brine potash, a key ingredient in fertilizer and is the second-largest source of potash in the country. Discovery of potash in the mid-1990s, has transformed Lop Nur into a major potash mining industry.

The oil and gas extraction industry in Aksu and Karamay is growing, with the West–East Gas Pipeline linking to Shanghai. The oil and petrochemical sector get up to 60 percent of Xinjiang's economy. The region contains over a fifth of China's hydrocarbon resources and has the highest concentration of fossil fuel reserves of any region in the country. The region is rich in coal and contains 40 percent of the country's coal reserves or around 2.2 trillion tonnes, which is enough to supply China's thermal coal demand for more than 100 years even if only 15 percent of the estimated coal reserve prove recoverable.

Tarim basin is the largest oil and gas bearing area in the country with about 16 billion tonnes of oil and gas reserves discovered. The area is still actively explored and in 2021, China National Petroleum Corporation found a new oil field reserve of 1 billion tons (about 907 million tonnes). That find is regarded as being the largest one in recent decades. As of 2021, the basin produces hydrocarbons at an annual rate of 2 million tons, up from 1.52 million tons from 2020.

=== Foreign trade ===
Trade with Central Asian countries is crucial to Xinjiang's economy. Most of the overall import / export volume in Xinjiang was directed to and from Kazakhstan through Ala Pass. China's first border free trade zone (Horgos Free Trade Zone) was located at the Xinjiang-Kazakhstan border city of Horgos. Horgos is the largest "land port" in China's western region and it has easy access to the Central Asian market. Xinjiang also opened its second border trade market to Kazakhstan in March 2006, the Jeminay Border Trade Zone.

Vietnam is a major importer of Xinjiang cotton.

=== Tourism ===
Tourism has become an increasingly important part of Xinjiang's economy following government efforts to boost it. In 2019, a total of 210 million tourists had visited Xinjiang. By 2025, this number increased to 323 million. Spending by tourists contributed $52 billion to Xinjiang's economy in 2025. This has led to an increasing number of hotels operating in Xinjiang; as of April 2026, at least 163 hotels from large international hotel companies were operating in Xinjiang.

=== Economic and Technological Development Zones ===
- Bole Border Economic Cooperation Area
- Shihezi Border Economic Cooperation Area
- Tacheng Border Economic Cooperation Area

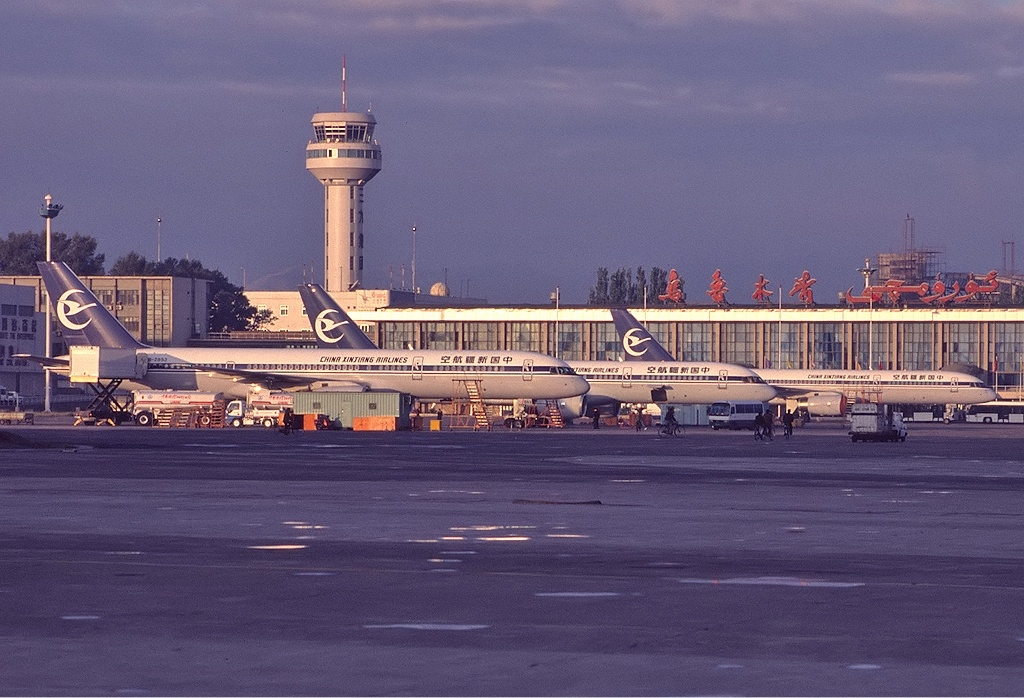
Ürümqi Diwopu International Airport

- Ürümqi Economic & Technological Development Zone is northwest of Ürümqi. It was approved in 1994 by the State Council as a national level economic and technological development zones. It is 1.5 km (0.93 mi) from the Ürümqi International Airport, 2 km (1.2 mi) from the North Railway Station and 10 km (6.2 mi) from the city center. Wu Chang Expressway and 312 National Road passes through the zone. The development has unique resources and geographical advantages. Xinjiang's vast land, rich in resources, borders eight countries. As the leading economic zone, it brings together the resources of Xinjiang's industrial development, capital, technology, information, personnel and other factors of production.
- Ürümqi Export Processing Zone is in Urumuqi Economic and Technology Development Zone. It was established in 2007 as a state-level export processing zone.
- Ürümqi New & Hi-Tech Industrial Development Zone was established in 1992 and it is the only high-tech development zone in Xinjiang, China. There are more than 3470 enterprises in the zone, of which 23 are Fortune 500 companies. It has a planned area of 9.8 km^{2} (3.8 sq mi) and it is divided into four zones. There are plans to expand the zone.
- Yining Border Economic Cooperation Area

== Culture ==
=== Media ===
The Xinjiang Networking Transmission Limited operates the Urumqi People's Broadcasting Station and the Xinjiang People Broadcasting Station, broadcasting in Mandarin, Uyghur, Kazakh and Mongolian.

In 1995, there were 50 minority-language newspapers published in Xinjiang, including the Qapqal News, the world's only Xibe language newspaper. The Xinjiang Economic Daily is considered one of China's most dynamic newspapers.

For a time after the July 2009 riots, authorities placed restrictions on the internet and text messaging, gradually permitting access to state-controlled websites like Xinhua News Agency, until restoring Internet to the same level as the rest of China on 14 May 2010.

== Demographics ==
Distribution of the Uyghur language in Xinjiang

Historical population
Year	Pop.	±%
1912	2,098,000	—
1928	2,552,000	+21.6%
1936–37	4,360,000	+70.8%
1947	4,047,000	−7.2%
1954	4,873,608	+20.4%
1964	7,270,067	+49.2%
1982	13,081,681	+79.9%
1990	15,155,778	+15.9%
2000	18,459,511	+21.8%
2010	21,813,334	+18.2%
2020	25,852,345	+18.5%

The earliest Tarim mummies, dated to 1800 BC, are of a Caucasoid physical type. East Asian migrants arrived in the eastern portions of the Tarim Basin about 3000 years ago and the Uyghur peoples appeared after the collapse of the Orkhon Uyghur Kingdom, based in modern-day Mongolia, around 842 AD.

The Islamization of Xinjiang started around 1000 AD. Xinjiang Muslim Turkic peoples contain Uyghurs, Kazaks, Kyrgyz, Tatars, Uzbeks; Muslim Iranian peoples comprise Tajiks, Sarikolis / Wakhis (often conflated as Tajiks); Muslim Sino-Tibetan peoples are such as the Hui. Other ethnic groups in the region are Hans, Mongols (Oirats, Daurs, Dongxiangs), Russians, Xibes, Manchus. Around 70,000 Russian immigrants were living in Xinjiang in 1945.

The Han Chinese of Xinjiang arrived at different times from different directions and social backgrounds. There are now descendants of criminals and officials who had been exiled from China during the second half of the 18th and the first half of the 19th centuries; descendants of families of military and civil officers from Hunan, Yunnan, Gansu and Manchuria; descendants of merchants from Shanxi, Tianjin, Hubei and Hunan; and descendants of peasants who started immigrating into the region in 1776.

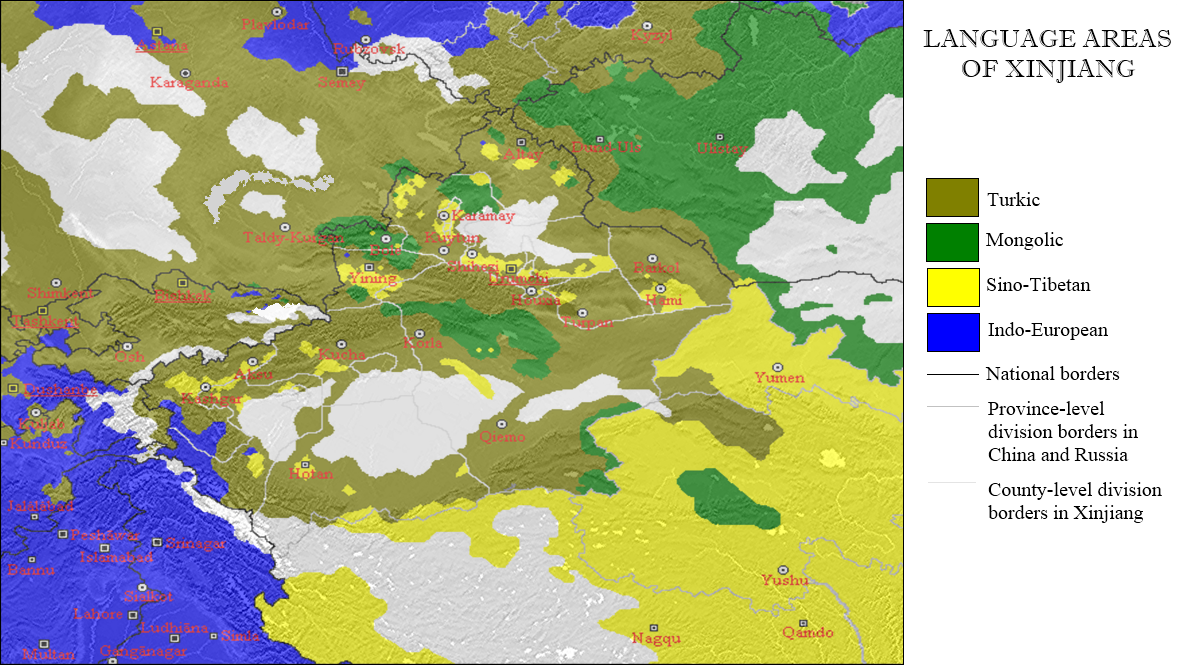
The languages of Xinjiang Uygur Autonomous Region

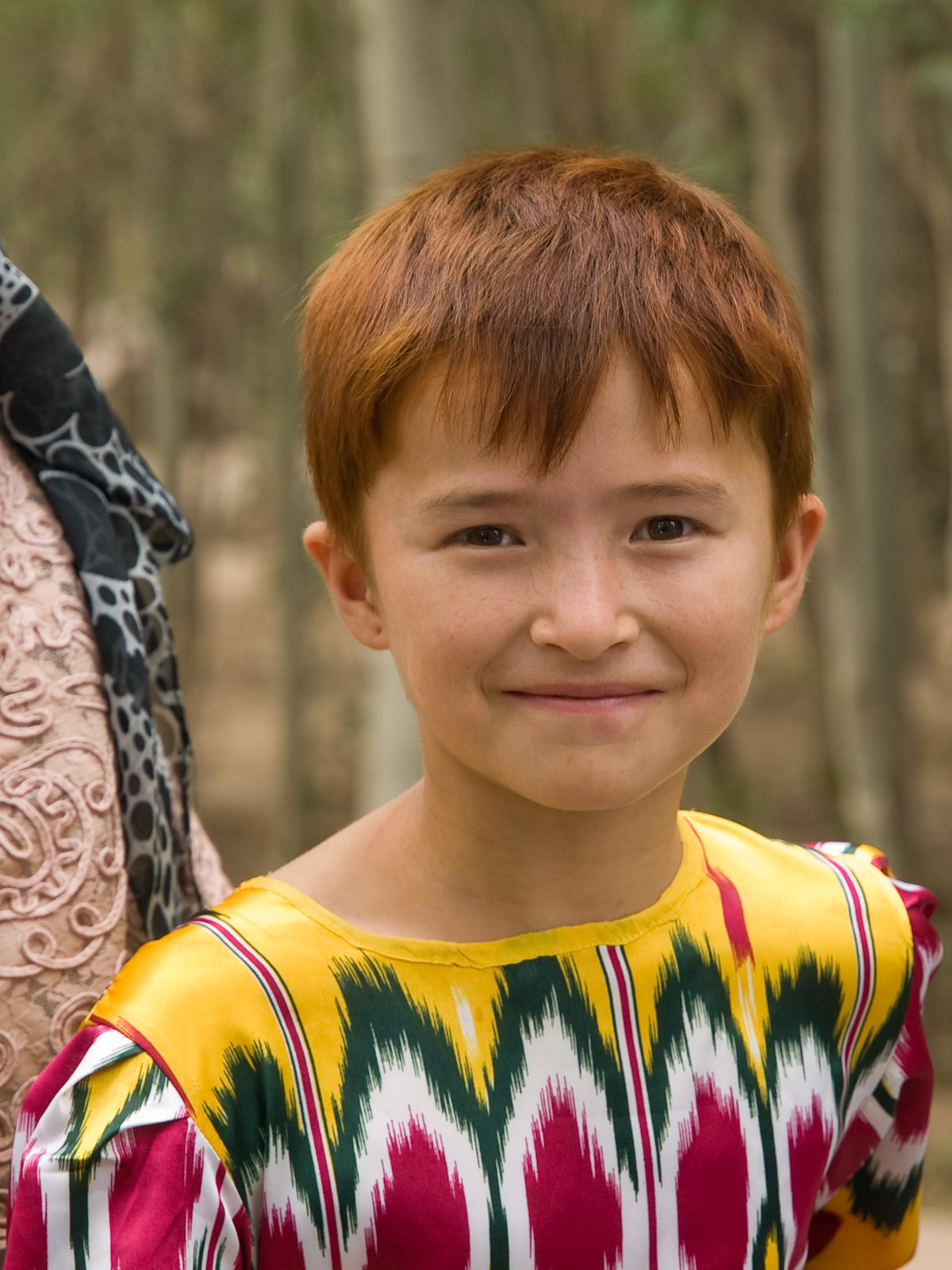
Uyghur girl in Kashgar

County-level ethnicity map of Xinjiang as of 2018

Some Uyghur scholars claim descent from both the Turkic Uyghurs and the pre-Turkic Tocharians (or Tokharians, whose language was Indo-European); also, Uyghurs often have relatively-fair skin, hair and eyes and other Caucasoid physical traits.

In 2002, there were 9,632,600 males (growth rate of 1.0 percent) and 9,419,300 females (growth rate of 2.2 percent). The population overall growth rate was 1.09 percent, with 1.63 percent of birth rate and 0.54 percent mortality rate.

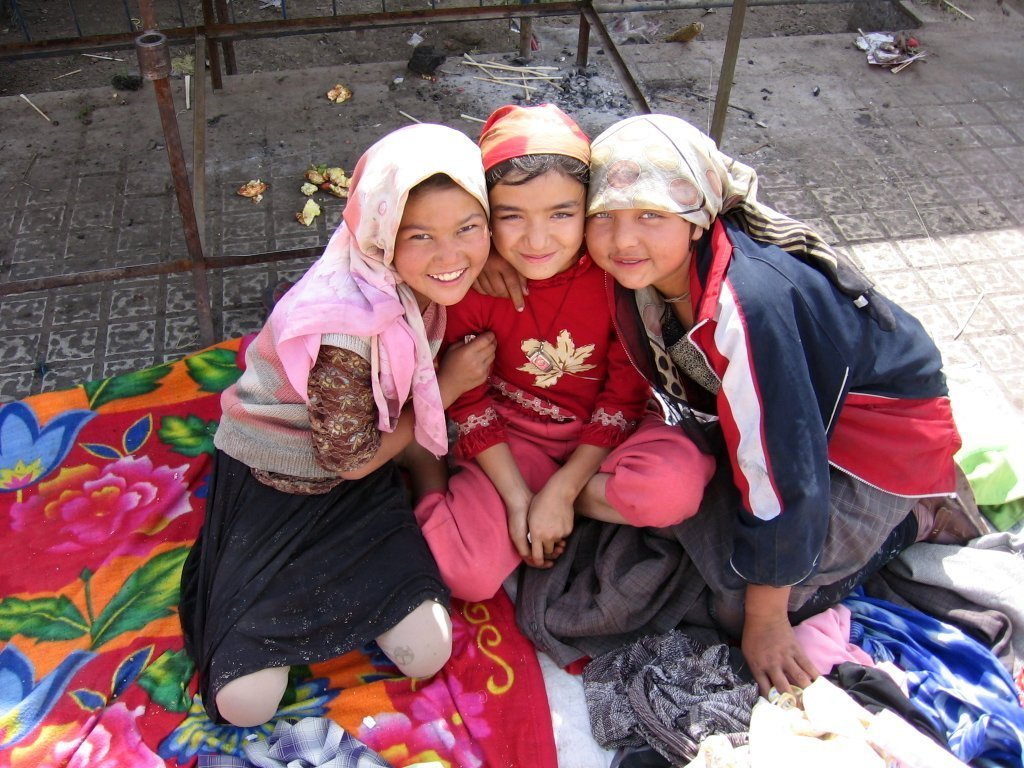
Three Uyghur girls at a Sunday market in the oasis city Khotan

Ethnic group	Estimated population 1933
Uyghurs	2,900,173 (77.75%)
Kazakhs	318,716 (8.55%)
Han Chinese	202,239 (5.41%)
Hui	92,146 (2.47%)
Kyrgyz	65,248 (1.75%)
Mongols	63,018 (1.69%)
Taranchis	41,307 (1.11%)
Russians	13,408 (0.36%)
Sibes	9,203 (0.25%)
Tajiks	8,867 (0.24%)
Uzbeks	7,966 (0.21%)
Tatars	4,601 (0.12%)
Solons	2,489 (0.07%)
Manchus	670 (0.02%)
Total	3,730,051

The Qing began a process of settling Han, Hui, and Uyghur settlers into Northern Xinjiang (Dzungaria) in the 18th century. At the start of the 19th century, 40 years after the Qing reconquest, there were around 155,000 Han and Hui Chinese in northern Xinjiang and somewhat more than twice that number of Uyghurs in Southern Xinjiang. A census of Xinjiang under Qing rule in the early 19th century tabulated ethnic shares of the population as 30 percent Han and 60 percent Turkic and it dramatically shifted to 6 percent Han and 75 percent Uyghur in the 1953 census. However, a situation similar to the Qing era's demographics with a large number of Han had been restored by 2000, with 40.57 percent Han and 45.21 percent Uyghur. Professor Stanley W. Toops noted that today's demographic situation is similar to that of the early Qing period in Xinjiang. Before 1831, only a few hundred Chinese merchants lived in Southern Xinjiang oases (Tarim Basin), and only a few Uyghurs lived in Northern Xinjiang (Dzungaria).

After 1831, the Qing encouraged Han Chinese migration into the Tarim Basin, in southern Xinjiang, but with very little success, and permanent troops were stationed on the land there as well. Political killings and expulsions of non-Uyghur populations during the uprisings in the 1860s and the 1930s saw them experience a sharp decline as a percentage of the total population though they rose once again in the periods of stability from 1880, which saw Xinjiang increase its population from 1.2 million, to 1949.

Ethnic breakdown of Xinjiang (1953)
Ethnicity	Percentage
Uyghurs	74.7%
Others	25.3%

In 1954, the National Bureau of Statistics published the 1953 Chinese census. It reported that as of 30 June 1953, the population of Xinjiang was 4,873,608, of which Uyghurs made up 74.7% of the population (3,640,125 people), while Han and other ethnic groups made up 25.3% of the population (1,233,483 people).

In 1978, at the beginning of the reform and opening up period, the demographic balance was reported to be 46 percent Uyghur and 40 percent Han. This did not change drastically until the 2000 Census, when the Uyghur population had reduced to 42 percent. In 2010, the population of Xinjiang was 45.84 percent Uyghur and 40.48 percent Han. The 2020 Census showed the share of the Uyghur population decline slightly to 44.96 percent, and the Han population rise to 42.24 percent

Military personnel are not counted and national minorities are undercounted in the Chinese census, as in some other censuses. 3.6 million people reside in XPCC administered areas, around 14 percent of Xinjiang's population. While some of the shift has been attributed to an increased Han presence, Uyghurs have also emigrated to other parts of China, where their numbers have increased steadily. Uyghur independence activists express concern over the Han population changing the Uyghur character of the region though the Han and Hui Chinese mostly live in Northern Xinjiang (Dzungaria) and are separated from areas of historic Uyghur dominance south of the Tian Shan mountains (Southwestern Xinjiang), where Uyghurs account for about 90 percent of the population.

In general, Uyghurs are the majority in Southwestern Xinjiang, including the prefectures of Kashgar, Khotan, Kizilsu and Aksu (about 80 percent of Xinjiang's Uyghurs live in those four prefectures) as well as Turpan Prefecture, in Eastern Xinjiang. The Han are the majority in Eastern and Northern Xinjiang (Dzungaria), including the cities of Ürümqi, Karamay, Shihezi and the prefectures of Changjyi, Bortala, Bayin'gholin, Ili (especially the cities of Kuitun) and Kumul. Kazakhs are mostly concentrated in Ili Prefecture in Northern Xinjiang. Kazakhs are the majority in the northernmost part of Xinjiang.

Largest cities in Xinjiang Source: China Urban Construction Statistical Yearbook 2018 Urban Population and Urban Temporary Population
Rank	Name	Pop.	Rank	Name	Pop.
1	Ürümqi	2,864,700	11	Bole	204,400
2	Korla	489,900	12	Wujiaqu	187,000
3	Aksu	460,900	13	Kuytun	174,700
4	Karamay	452,500	14	Fukang	109,200
5	Yining	372,600	15	Wusu	100,900
6	Changji	361,700	16	Tacheng	97,600
7	Shihezi	338,200	17	Aral	96,000
8	Kashgar	330,000	18	Turpan	86,200
9	Hami	245,700	19	Beitun	79,800
10	Hotan	217,900	20	Artush	78,300

Ethnic groups in Xinjiang
2020 Chinese census
Nationality	Population	Percentage
Uyghur	11,624,257	44.96 percent
Han	10,920,098	42.24 percent
Kazakh	1,539,636	5.96 percent
Hui	1,102,928	4.27 percent
Kirghiz	199,264	0.77 percent
Mongols	169,143	0.65 percent
Dongxiang	72,036	0.28 percent
Tajiks	50,238	0.19 percent
Xibe	34,105	0.13 percent
Manchu	20,915	0.080 percent
Tujia	15,787	0.086 percent
Tibetan	18,276	0.071 percent
Uzbek	12,301	0.048 percent
Miao	12,220	0.047 percent
Russian	8,024	0.031 percent
Yi	7,752	0.030 percent
Zhuang	5,727	0.022 percent
Daur	5,447	0.021 percent
Tatar	5,183	0.024 percent
Tu	3,827	0.015 percent
Salar	3,266	0.013 percent
Other	11,764	0.046 percent

Major ethnic groups in Xinjiang by region (2018 data) (Note: Does not include members of the People's Liberation Army in active service.) P = Prefecture; AP = Autonomous prefecture; PLC = Prefecture-level city; DACLC = Directly administered county-level city.
	Uyghurs (%)	Han (%)	Kazakhs (%)	others (%)
Xinjiang	51.14	34.41	6.90	7.55
Ürümqi PLC	12.85	71.21	2.77	13.16
Karamay PLC	15.59	74.67	4.05	5.69
Turpan Prefecture	76.96	16.84	0.05	6.15
Kumul Prefecture	20.01	65.49	10.04	4.46
Changji AP	4.89	72.28	10.34	12.49
Bortala AP	14.76	63.27	10.41	11.56
Bayin'gholin AP	36.38	53.31	0.11	10.20
Aksu Prefecture	80.08	18.56	0.01	1.36
Kizilsu AP	66.24	6.29	0.03	27.44
Kashgar Prefecture	92.56	6.01	< 0.005	1.42
Khotan Prefecture	96.96	2.85	< 0.005	0.19
Ili AP (Note: Ili Kazakh Autonomous Prefecture is composed of Kuitun DACLC, Tacheng Prefecture, Aletai Prefecture, and the former Ili Prefecture. Ili Prefecture has been disbanded and its former area is now directly administered by Ili AP.)	17.95	40.09	27.16	14.80
– former Ili Prefecture	26.30	35.21	21.57	16.91
– Tacheng Prefecture	4.25	54.66	26.66	14.43
– Altay Prefecture	1.42	39.85	52.76	5.97
Shihezi DACLC	1.09	94.13	0.63	4.15
Aral DACLC	3.66	91.96	< 0.005	4.38
Tumushuke DACLC	67.49	31.73	< 0.005	0.78
Wujiaqu DACLC	0.05	96.29	0.10	3.55
Tiemenguan DACLC	0.07	95.96	0.00	3.97

Vital statistics
Year	Population	Live births	Deaths	Natural change	Crude birth rate (per 1000)	Crude death rate (per 1000)	Natural change (per 1000)
2011	22,090,000				14.99	4.42	10.57
2012	22,330,000				15.32	4.48	10.84
2013	22,640,000				15.84	4.92	10.92
2014	22,980,000				16.44	4.97	11.47
2015	23,600,000				15.59	4.51	11.08
2016	23,980,000				15.34	4.26	11.08
2017	24,450,000				15.88	4.48	11.40
2018	24,870,000				10.69	4.56	6.13
2019	25,230,000				8.14	4.45	3.69
2020	25,852,000				7.01		
2021	25,890,000				6.16	5.60	0.56

=== Religion ===
Religion in Xinjiang (around 2010)
1. Islam (58.0%)
2. Buddhism (32.0%)
3. Taoism (9.00%)
4. Christianity (1.00%)

The major religions in Xinjiang are Islam, practiced largely by Uyghurs and the Hui Chinese minority, as well as Chinese folk religions, Confucianism, Taoism and Buddhism, practiced essentially by the Han Chinese. Christianity in Xinjiang is practiced by 1 percent of the population according to the Chinese General Social Survey of 2009. According to a demographic analysis of the year 2010, Muslims formed 58 percent of the province's population. In 1950, there were 29,000 mosques and 54,000 imams in Xinjiang, which fell to 14,000 mosques and 29,000 imams by 1966. Following the Cultural Revolution, there were only about 1,400 remaining mosques. By the mid-1980's, the number of mosques had returned to 1950 levels. According to a 2020 report by the Australian Strategic Policy Institute, since 2017, Chinese authorities have destroyed or damaged 16,000 mosques in Xinjiang – 65 percent of the region's total.

According to a DeWereldMorgen report in March 2024, there are more than 100 Islamic associations in Xinjiang where imams have lessons in theology, Arabic and Mandarin. A majority of the Uyghur Muslims adhere to Sunni Islam of the Hanafi school of jurisprudence or madhab. A minority of Shias, almost exclusively of the Nizari Ismaili (Seveners) rites are located in the higher mountains of Tajik and Tian Shan. In the western mountains (the Tajiks), almost the entire population of Tajiks (Sarikolis and Wakhis), are Nizari Ismaili Shia. In the north, in the Tian Shan, the Kazakhs and Kyrgyz are Sunni.

Afaq Khoja Mausoleum and Id Kah Mosque in Kashgar are most important Islamic Xinjiang sites. Emin Minaret in Turfan is a key Islamic site. Bezeklik Thousand Buddha Caves is a notable Buddhist site. In Awat County also lies a huge park with a statue of Turkish-Muslim philosopher Nasreddin.

== Sports ==
Xinjiang is home to the Xinjiang Flying Tigers professional basketball team of the Chinese Basketball Association and the Xinjiang Magic Deer of the Women's Chinese Basketball Association. It was previously home to the now-defunct Xinjiang Tianshan Leopard F.C., a football team that most recently played in China League One.

The capital, Ürümqi, is home to the Xinjiang University baseball team, an integrated Uyghur and Han group profiled in the documentary film Diamond in the Dunes.

== Transportation ==
=== Roads ===
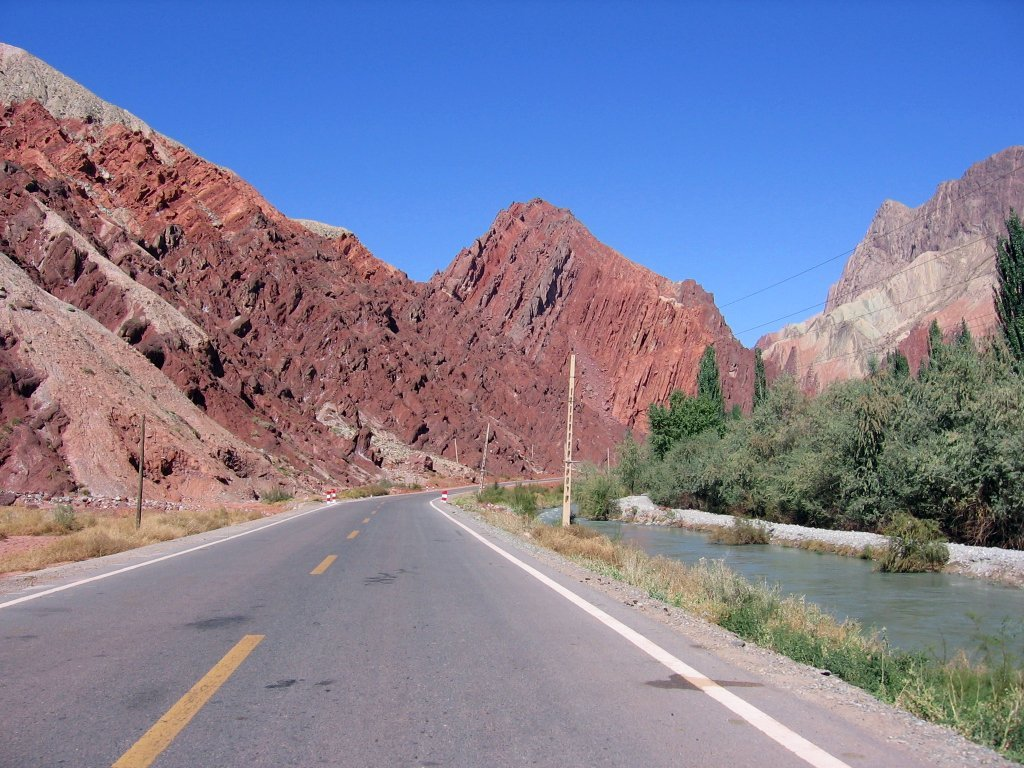
Karakorum highway

In 2008, according to the Xinjiang Transportation Network Plan, the government has focused construction on State Road 314, Alar-Hotan Desert Highway, State Road 218, Qingshui River Line-Yining Highway and State Road 217, as well as other roads.

The construction of the first expressway in the mountainous area of Xinjiang began a new stage in its construction on 24 July 2007. The 56 km (35 mi) highway linking Sayram Lake and Guozi Valley in Northern Xinjiang area had cost 2.39 billion yuan. The expressway is designed to improve the speed of national highway 312 in northern Xinjiang. The project started in August 2006 and several stages have been fully operational since March 2007. Over 3,000 construction workers have been involved. The 700 m-long Guozigou Bridge, China's first highway double-tower double-cable steel truss cable-stayed bridge, forms part of the G30 Lianyungang–Khorgas Expressway which connects Ili to Northern Xinjiang. Highway 312 national highway Xinjiang section, connects Xinjiang with China's east coast, Central and West Asia, plus some parts of Europe. It is a key factor in Xinjiang's economic development. The population it covers is around 40 percent of the overall in Xinjiang, who contribute half of the GDP in the area.

Zulfiya Abdiqadir, head of the Transport Department was quoted as saying that 24,800,000,000 RMB had been invested into Xinjiang's road network in 2010 alone and, by this time, the roads covered approximately 152,000 km (94,000 mi).

=== Rail ===
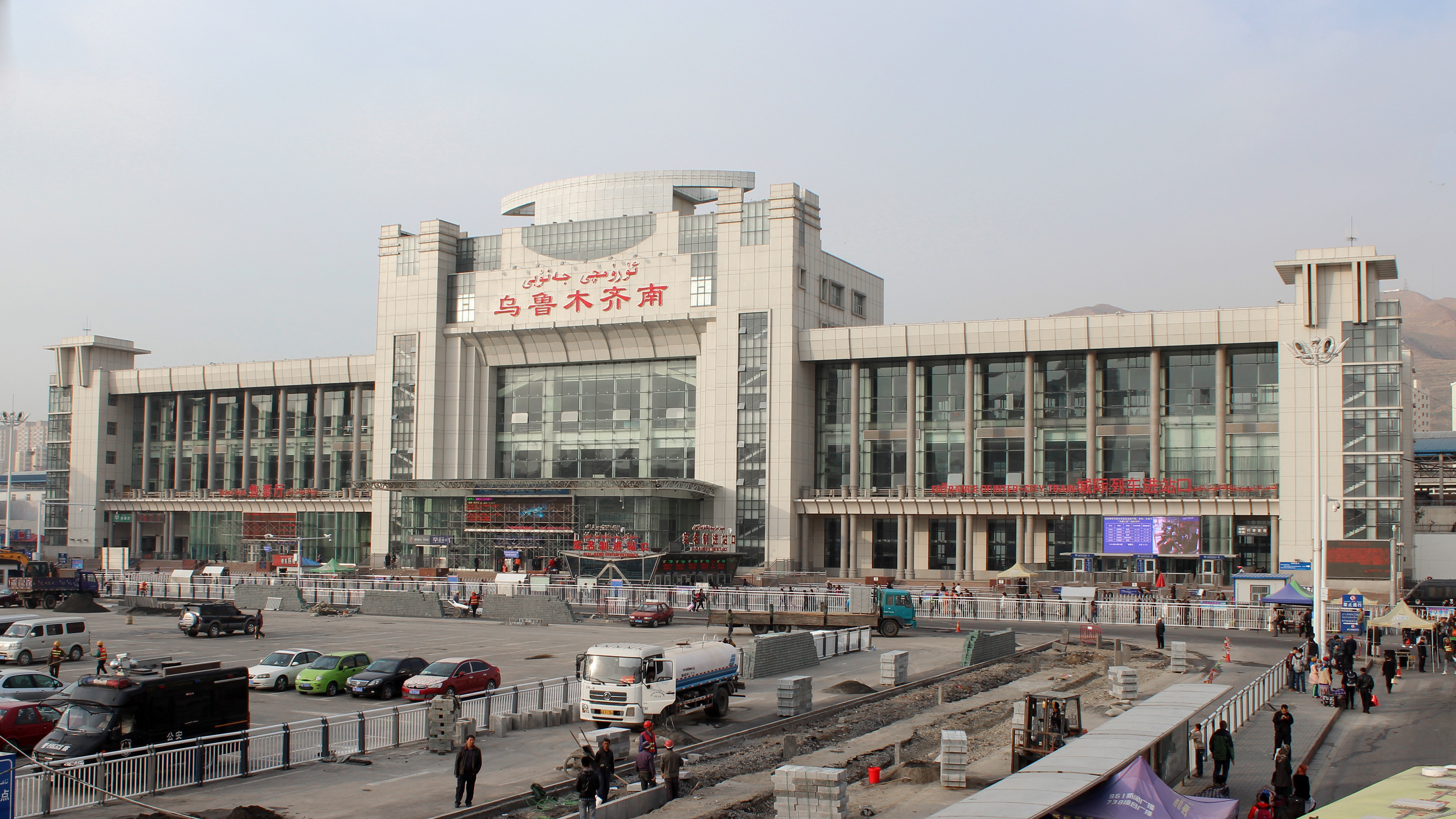
Ürümqi South railway station

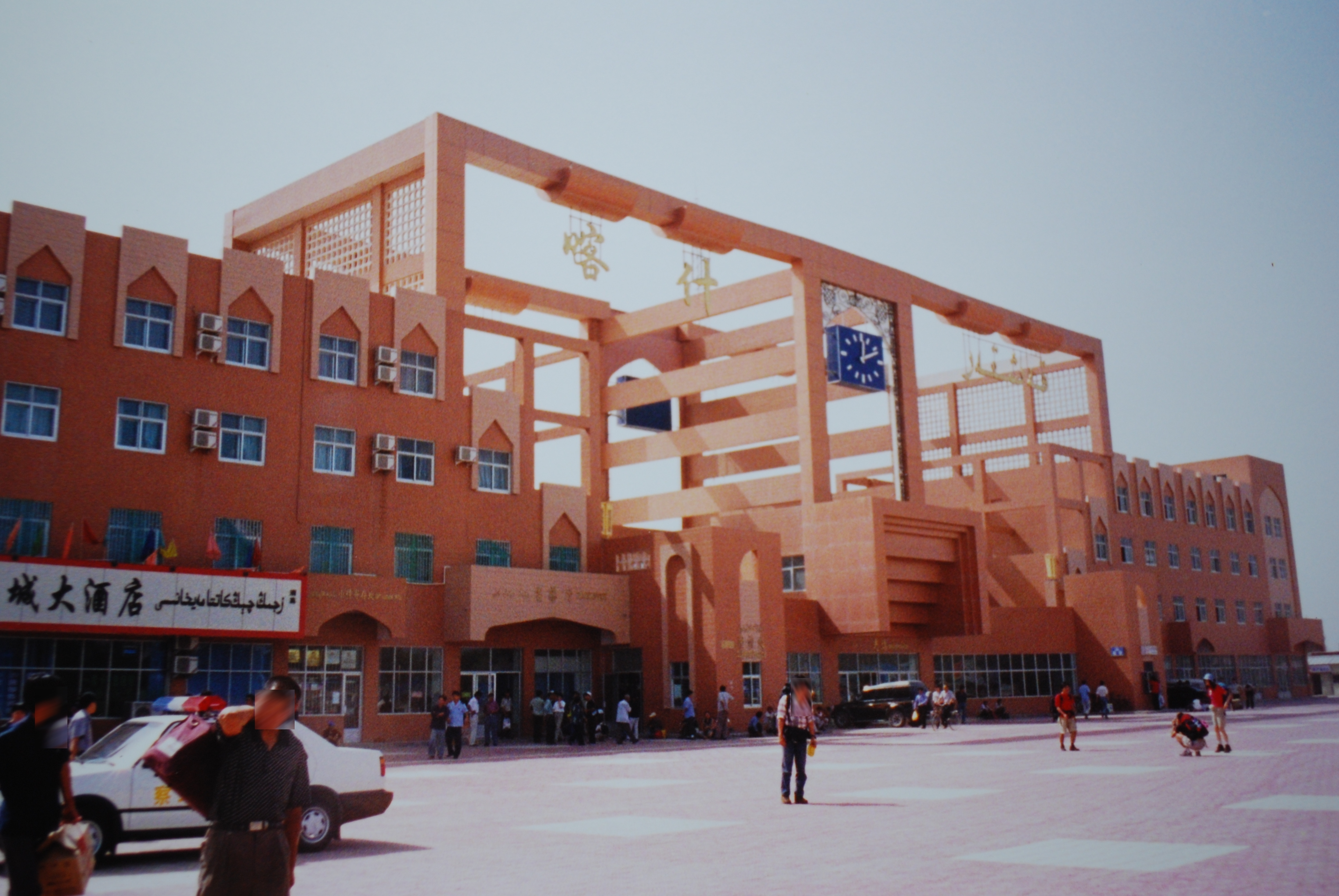
Kashgar railway station

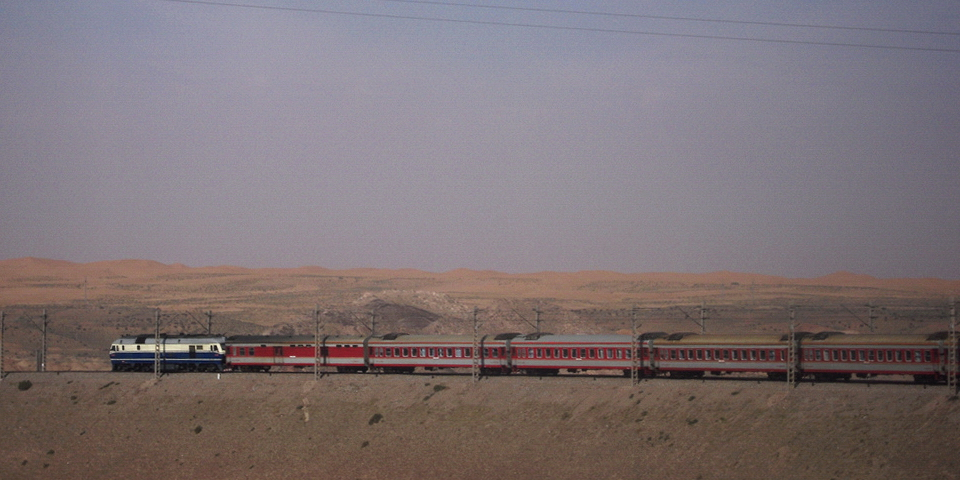
Lanzhou-Xinjiang Railway

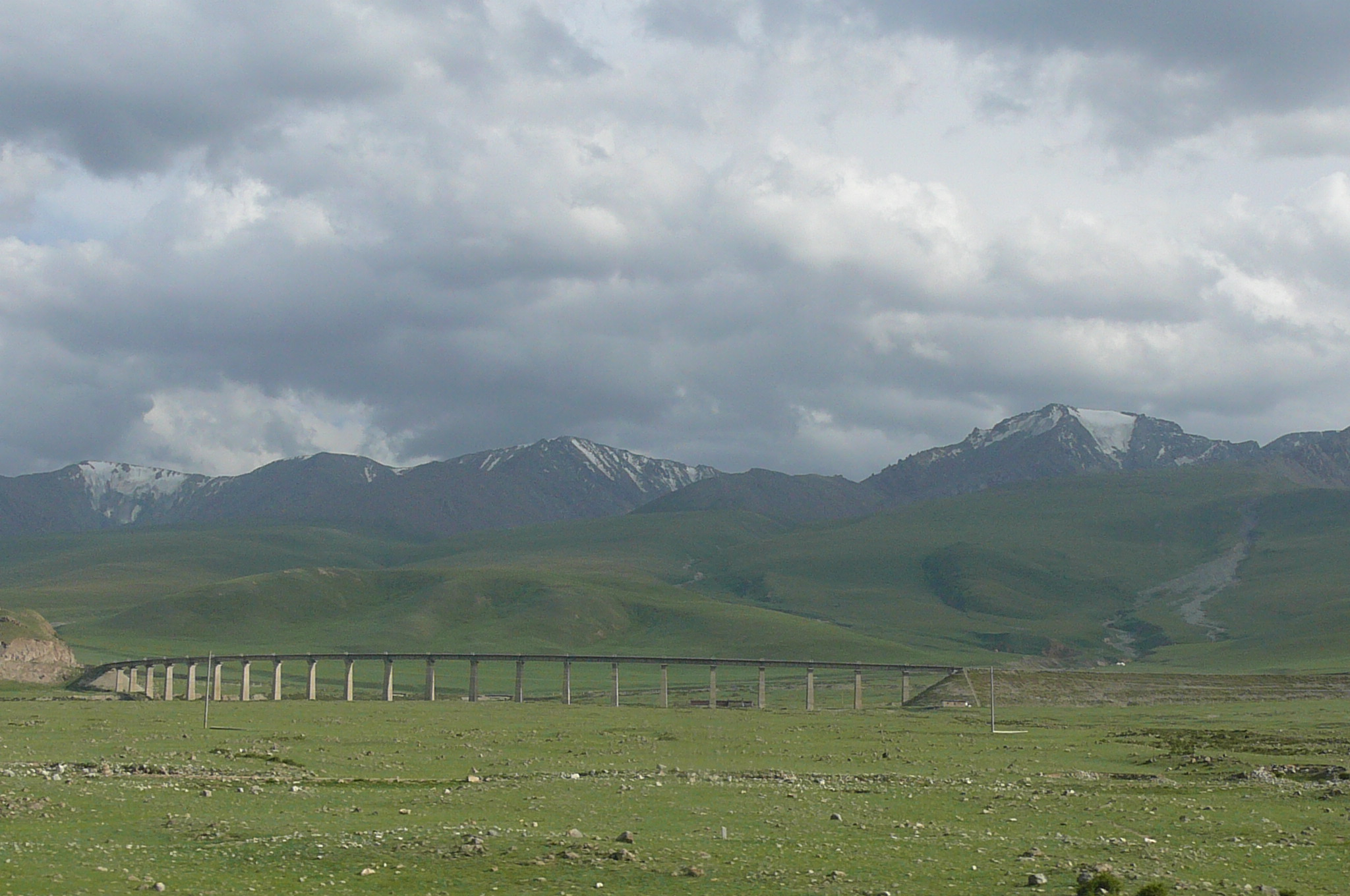
Southern Xinjiang Railway

Xinjiang's rail hub is Ürümqi, which is also the only city in Xinjiang to have its own metro system. To the east, a conventional and a high-speed rail line runs through Turpan and Hami to Lanzhou in Gansu Province. A third outlet to the east connects Hami and Inner Mongolia.

To the west, the Northern Xinjiang runs along the northern footslopes of the Tian Shan range through Changji, Shihezi, Kuytun and Jinghe to the Kazakh border at Alashankou, where it links up with the Turkestan–Siberia Railway. Together, the Northern Xinjiang and the Lanzhou-Xinjiang lines form part of the Trans-Eurasian Continental Railway, which extends from Rotterdam, on the North Sea, to Lianyungang, on the East China Sea. The Northern Xinjiang railway provides additional rail transport capacity to Jinghe, from which the Jinghe–Yining–Khorgos railway heads into the Ili River Valley to Yining, Huocheng and Khorgos, a second rail border crossing with Kazakhstan. The Kuytun–Beitun railway runs from Kuytun north into the Junggar Basin to Karamay and Beitun, near Altay.

In the south, the Southern Xinjiang railway from Turpan runs southwest along the southern footslopes of the Tian Shan into the Tarim Basin, with stops at Yanqi, Korla, Kuqa, Aksu, Maralbexi (Bachu), Artux and Kashgar. From Kashgar, the Kashgar–Hotan railway, follows the southern rim of the Tarim to Hotan, with stops at Shule, Akto, Yengisar, Shache (Yarkant), Yecheng (Karghilik), Moyu (Karakax). There are also the Hotan–Ruoqiang railway and Golmud–Korla railway.

The Ürümqi–Dzungaria railway connects Ürümqi with coal fields in the eastern Junggar Basin. The Hami–Lop Nur railway connects Hami with potassium salt mines in and around Lop Nur. The Golmud–Korla railway, opened in 2020, provides an outlet to Qinghai. Planning is underway on additional intercity railways. Railways to Pakistan and Kyrgyzstan have been proposed.

== See also ==
- Administrative divisions of China
