= List of cities in Xinjiang =

This is a list of cities in Xinjiang Uyghur Autonomous Region in the People's Republic of China. A settlement with a population over 100,000 is usually counted as a city in China. The capital and largest city is Ürümqi. The list is in alphabetical order.

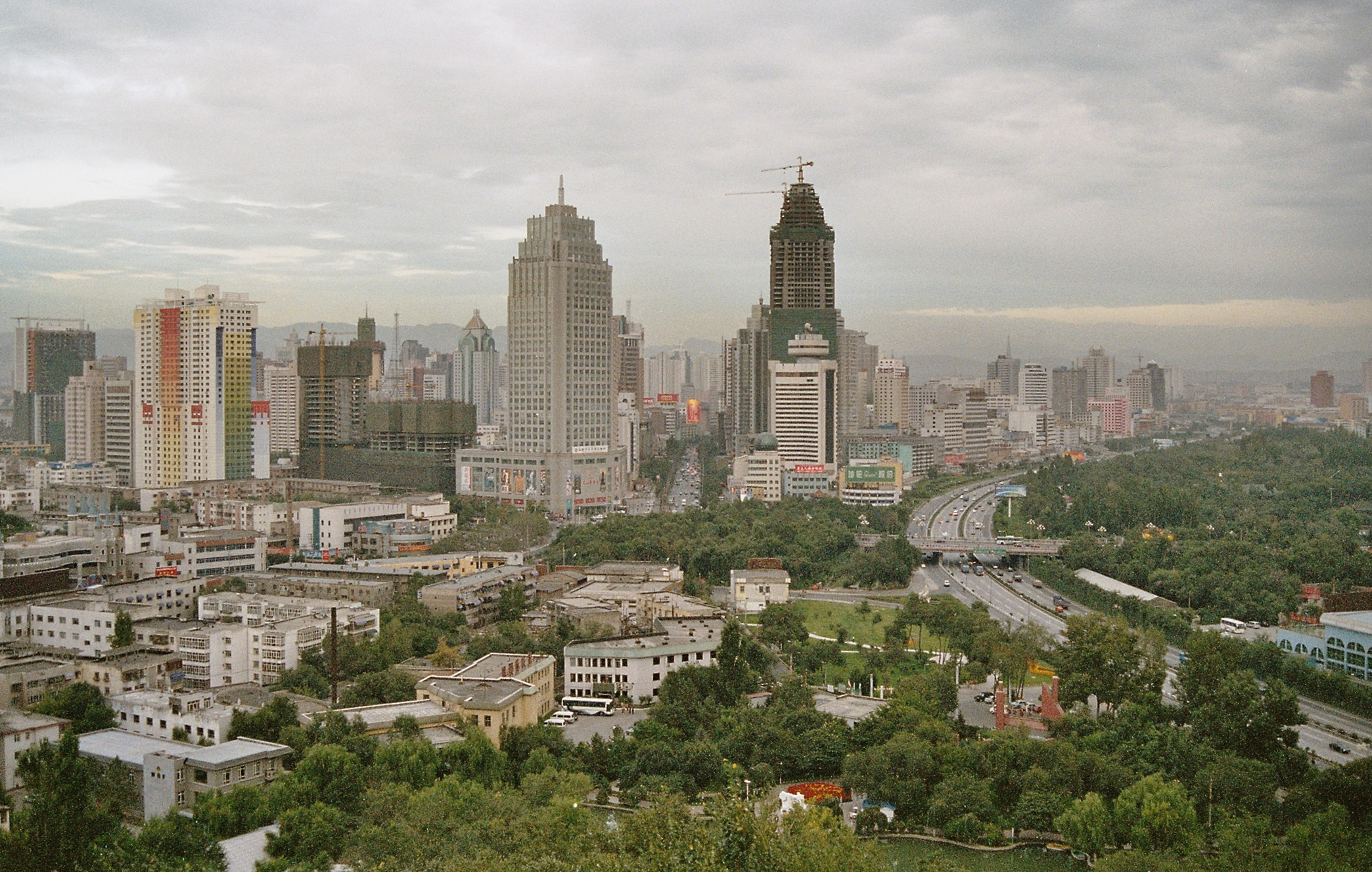
Ürümqi

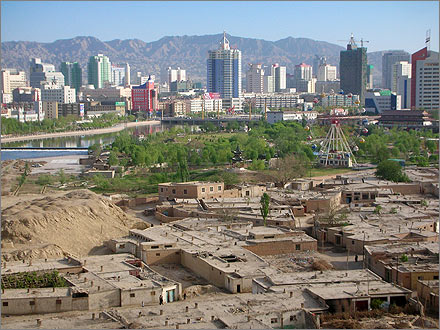
Old and new cities of Korla

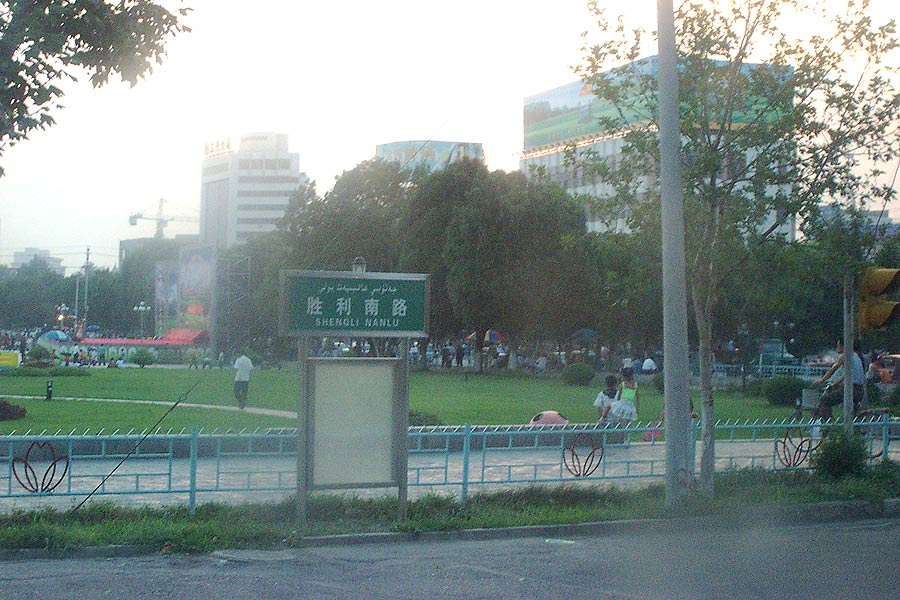
Yining city square

Prefectural-level

City	Chinese	Pinyin	Uyghur	Yengi Yezik̡	Latin Yëziqi	SASM/GNC
Hami	哈密	Hāmì	قۇمۇل	K̡umul	Qumul	K̂umul
Karamay	克拉玛依	Kèlāmǎyī	قاراماي	K̡aramay	Qaramay	K̂aramay
Turpan	吐鲁番	Tǔlǔfān	تۇرپان	Turpan	Turpan	Turpan
Ürümqi	乌鲁木齐	Wūlǔmùqí	ئۈرۈمچی	Ürümqi	Ürümchi	Ürümqi

County-level

City	Chinese	Pinyin	Uyghur	Yengi Yezik̡	Latin Yéziqi	SASM/GNC
Aksu	阿克苏	Ākèsū	ئاقسۇ	Ak̡su	Aqsu	Ak̂su
Altay	阿勒泰	Ālètài	ئالتاي	Altay	Altay	Altay
Alashankou	阿拉山口	Ālāshānkǒu	ﺋﺎﻻﺗﺎﯞ ئېغىزى	Alataw Eƣizi	Alataw Ëghizi	Alataw Êĝizi
Aral	阿拉尔	Ālā'ěr	ئارال	Aral	Aral	Aral
Artux	阿图什	Ātúshí	ئاتۇش	Atux	Atush	Atux
Beitun	北屯	Běitún	بەيتۈن	Bəytün	Beytün	Bäytün
Bole	博乐	Bólè	بۆرتالا	Bɵrtala	Börtala	Börtala
Changji	昌吉	Chāngjí	سانجى	Sanji	Sanji	Sanji
Fukang	阜康	Fùkāng	فۇكاڭ	Fukang	Fukang	Fukang
Hotan	和田	Hétián	خوتەن	Hotən	Hoten	Hotän
Kashgar	喀什	Kāshí	قەشقەر	K̡əxk̡ər	Qeshqer	K̂äxk̂är
Korla	库尔勒	Kù'ěrlè	كورلا	Korla	Korla	Korla
Kokdala	可克达拉	Kěkèdálā	كۆكدالا	Kɵkdala	Kökdala	Kökdala
Kunyu	昆玉	Kūnyù	قۇرۇمقاش	Kurumkax	Qurumqash	Kurumkax
Kuytun	奎屯	Kuítún	كۈيتۇن	Küytun	Küytun	Küytun
Korgas	霍尔果斯	Huò'ěrguǒsī	قورعاس	K̡orğas	Qorğas	K̂orğas
Shihezi	石河子	Shíhézǐ	شىخەنزە	Xihənzə	Shixenze	Xihänzä
Shuanghe	双河	Shuānghé	قوشئۆگۈز	K̡oxɵgüz	Qoshögüz	K̂oxögüz
Tiemenguan	铁门关	Tiĕménguān	باشئەگىم	Baxəgym	Bashegym	Baxägym
Tumxuk	图木舒克	Túmùshūkè	تۇمشۇق	Tumxuk̡	Tumshuq	Tumxuk̂
Tacheng	塔城	Tǎchéng	چۆچەك	Qɵqək	Chöchek	Qöqäk
Wusu	乌苏	Wūsū	ۋۇسۇ	Usu	Usu	Usu
Wujiaqu	五家渠	Wǔjiāqú	ۋۇجياچۈ	Vujyaqü	Wujyachü	Vujyaqü
Yining	伊宁	Yīníng	غۇلجا	Ƣulja	Ghulja	Ĝulja

== See also ==
- List of cities in China
- Lists of cities by country
