= Provincial-controlled division =

A provincial-controlled division (Chinese: 省直辖县级行政区; pinyin: shěng zhíxiá xiàn jí xíngzhèngqū), is an unofficial designation for a type of administrative division of China. Every provincial-controlled divisions is officially considered to be a county-level city or county, but it has more power de facto because it is directly under the province similar to prefectural-level divisions.

== List of provincial-controlled divisions ==
=== Hubei ===
- Tianmen
- Xiantao
- Qianjiang
- Shennongjia

=== Henan ===
- Jiyuan
- Gongyi
- Ruzhou
- Dengzhou
- Yongcheng
- Huaxian (county)
- Changyuan County
- Lankao County
- Gushi County
- Luyi County
- Xincai County

=== Xinjiang ===
Note: all cities are governed by the Xinjiang Production and Construction Corps (XPCC, Bintuan)

- Shihezi
- Aral
- Tumxuk
- Wujiaqu
- Beitun
- Tiemenguan
- Shuanghe

=== Jilin ===
- Gongzhuling
- Meihekou

=== Liaoning ===
- Suizhong County
- Changtu County

=== Gansu ===
- Dunhuang
- Yumen

=== Hebei ===
- Dingzhou
- Xinji

=== Heilongjiang ===
- Suifenhe
- Fuyuan County

=== Guizhou ===
- Renhuai
- Weining County (Yi, Hui, and Miao Autonomous)

=== Anhui ===
- Guangde County
- Susong County

=== Guangxi ===
- Cenxi
- Guiping
- Pingxiang
- Wuming County
- Liujiang County
- Xing'an County
- Yangshuo County
- Rongxian (county)
- Debao County
- Du'an County(Yao Autonomous)

=== Jiangsu ===
- Kunshan
- Taixing
- Shuyang County

=== Shandong ===
- Laiyang
- Anqiu
- Rongcheng
- Shanghe County
- Gaoqing County
- Jinxiang County
- Sishui County
- Tancheng County
- Pingyi County
- Ningyang County
- Shenxian (county)
- Guanxian (county)
- Caoxian (county)
- Juancheng County
- Xiajin County
- Qingyun County
- Huimin County
- Yangxin County
- Lijin County
- Juxian (county)

=== Guangdong ===
- Shunde District
- Yangchun
- Gaozhou
- Yingde
- Puning
- Luoding
- Nanxiong
- Xingning
- Longchuan County
- Wuhua County
- Boluo County
- Xuwen County
- Raoping County
- Zijin County
- Fengkai County

=== Jiangxi ===
- Gongqingcheng
- Ruijin
- Fengcheng
- Poyang County
- Anfu County
- Nancheng County
