= Shuanghe =

Shuanghe 双河市 (Chinese) قوشئۆگۈز شەھىرى (Uyghur)
- County-level city
- Location in Xinjiang Shuanghe (Xinjiang) Shuanghe (China)
- Coordinates: 44°50′24.0″N 82°21′06.1″E
- Country: China
- Autonomous region: Xinjiang
- Established: 26 February 2014

Government
  - CCP Secretary: Mao Zhibing (Political Commissar of the 5th Division)
  - Mayor: Wang Qiang (Commander of the 5th Division)

Area
  - Total: 742.18 km^{2} (286.56 sq mi)

Population (2020)
  - Total: 54,731
  - Density: 73.744/km^{2} (190.99/sq mi)
- Time zone: UTC+8 (China Standard (Note: Locals in Xinjiang frequently observe UTC+6 (Xinjiang Time), 2 hours behind Beijing.))
- Website: www.xjshs.gov.cn

Shuanghe

Chinese name
- Simplified Chinese: 双河
- Traditional Chinese: 雙河
Transcriptions
Standard Mandarin
- Hanyu Pinyin: Shuānghé

Alternative Chinese name
- Chinese: 霍索固兹
Transcriptions
Standard Mandarin
- Hanyu Pinyin: Huòsuǒgùzī

Uyghur name
- Uyghur: قوشئۆگۈز
Transcriptions
- Latin Yëziqi: Qoshögüz
- Yengi Yeziⱪ: Ⱪoxɵgüz
- SASM/GNC: Koxögüz
- Siril Yëziqi: Қошөгүз

Shuanghe (Chinese: 双河) is a county-level city in Xinjiang Uyghur Autonomous Region, China. It is located 30 kilometres (19 mi) east of Bole City and 50 kilometres (31 mi) southwest of Alashankou and the border with Kazakhstan. Shuanghe governs an area of 742.18 square kilometres (286.56 sq mi) and has a population of 53,800.

Shuanghe is the headquarter of the 5th Division of Xinjiang Production and Construction Corps and currently administered by the 5th Division. The city implemented the "division and city integration" (师市合一, shī shì héyī) management system, it shares the same leader group with the 5th Division.

== Name ==
The name Shuanghe means "two rivers", referring to the Bortala River and Jing River (Tsingho) (精河). It is named after the Tang dynasty administrative division Shuanghe Dudufu (双河都督府), which was established in the area in 658 AD.

== History ==
The city was formerly the settled and cultivated areas of the Fifth Division of the Xinjiang Production and Construction Corps (XPCC). In January 2014, the State Council of China approved the establishment of Shuanghe City and the city was formally established on 26 February 2014. Shuanghe is the seventh city in Xinjiang converted from XPCC land, after Shihezi, Aral, Tumxuk, Wujiaqu, Beitun, and Tiemenguan. Like the other cities of XPCC, it is a county-level city directly administered by Xinjiang Autonomous Region, without an intervening prefectural government.

== Administrative divisions ==
Shuanghe contains 1 subdistrict, 5 towns, and 1 township-equivalent region:

Name	Simplified Chinese	Hanyu Pinyin	Uyghur (UEY)	Uyghur Latin (ULY)	Administrative division code
Subdistricts
Mingzhu Subdistrict	明珠街道	Míngzhū Jiēdào			659007001
Towns
Shuangqiao Town (81st Regiment Farm)*	双桥镇 (八十一团)	Shuāngqiáo Zhèn			659007100
Shiyu Town (84th Regiment Farm)*	石峪镇 (八十四团)	Shíyù Zhèn			659007101
Bohe Town (86th Regiment Farm)*	博河镇 (八十六团)	Bóhé Zhèn			659007102
Shuangle Town (90th Regiment Farm)*	双乐镇 (九十团)	Shuānglè Zhèn			659007103
Youyi Town (89th Regiment Farm)*	友谊镇 (八十九团)	Yǒuyì Zhèn			659007104
township-equivalent region
Shuanghe City Core Area	双河市核心区	Shuānghé Shì Héxīnqū			659007400
* One institution with two names. See also Tuntian#People's Republic of China.
