= Huyanghe =

County-level city in Xinjiang, China

Huyanghe 胡杨河市 (Chinese) خۇياڭخې شەھىرى (Uyghur)
- County-level & Sub-prefectural city
- Interactive map of Huyanghe
- Location in Xinjiang Huyanghe (Xinjiang) Huyanghe (China)
- Coordinates: 44°41′33″N 84°49′30″E
- Country: China
- Autonomous region: Xinjiang
- Established: 6 December 2019

Government
  - CCP Secretary: Li Huabin (Political Commissar of the 7th Division)
  - Mayor: Song Xuehua (Commander of the 7th Division)

Area
  - Total: 678 km^{2} (262 sq mi)

Population (2020)
  - Total: 29,891
  - Density: 44.1/km^{2} (114/sq mi)
- Time zone: UTC+8 (China Standard Time (Note: Locals in Xinjiang frequently observe UTC+6 (Xinjiang Time), 2 hours behind Beijing.))
- Website: www.nqs.gov.cn

Huyanghe

Chinese name
- Simplified Chinese: 胡杨河
- Traditional Chinese: 胡楊河
Transcriptions
Standard Mandarin
- Hanyu Pinyin: Húyánghé

Uyghur name
- Uyghur: خۇياڭخې شەھىرى
Transcriptions
- Latin Yëziqi: Xuyangxë Shehiri
- Yengi Yeziⱪ: Huyanghe Xəⱨiri
- SASM/GNC: Huyanghê Xäĥiri
- Siril Yëziqi: Хуяңхе ШəҺири

Huyanghe is a county-level city in Xinjiang Uyghur Autonomous Region, China. It is geographically located in Tacheng Prefecture of Northwestern Xinjiang, but is directly administered by the 7th Division of XPCC, which headquartered here. The city implemented the "division and city integration" (师市合一, shī shì héyī) management system, it shares the same leader group with the 7th Division.

Huyanghe was formerly the settled and cultivated areas of the 130th Regiment of the 7th Division of the Xinjiang Production and Construction Corps (XPCC).

== Administrative divisions ==
Huyanghe contains 1 subdistrict, 1 town, 1 core area, and 3 township-equivalent regions:

Name	Simplified Chinese	Hanyu Pinyin	Uyghur (UEY)	Uyghur Latin (ULY)	Administrative division code
Subistrict
Huyang Subdistrict	胡杨街道	Húyáng Jiēdào			659010001
Town
Gongqing Town	共青镇	Gòngqīng Zhèn			659010100
core area
Huyanghe City Core Area	胡杨河市核心区	Húyánghé Shì Héxīnqū			659010400
township-equivalent regions
125th Regiment Farm*	一二五团	125 Tuán	125-تۇەن	125-tuen	659010500
128th Regiment Farm*	一二八团	128 Tuán	128-تۇەن	128-tuen	659010501
129th Regiment Farm*	一二九团	129 Tuán	129-تۇەن	129-tuen	659010502
* See also Tuntian#People's Republic of China.
