= Tiemenguan City =

Tiemenguan 铁门关市 (Chinese) باشئەگىم شەھىرى (Uyghur)
- County-level city
- Map of Tiemenguan. The Western portion, and the small enclave next to it, are part of Shuangfeng Town, while the eastern enclave is Boguqi Town.

- Location of the seat in Xinjiang Tiemenguan (Xinjiang) Tiemenguan (China)
- Coordinates: 41.820°N 85.653°E
- Country: China
- Autonomous region: Xinjiang
- Established: December 2012
- Municipal seat: Yingbin Subdistrict

Government
  - CCP Secretary: Fan Wenming (Political Commissar of the 2nd Division)
  - Mayor: Wang Lei (Commander of the 2nd Division)

Area
  - Total: 590.27 km^{2} (227.90 sq mi)

Population (2020)
  - Total: 104,746
  - Density: 177.45/km^{2} (459.60/sq mi)
- Time zone: UTC+8 (China Standard (Note: Locals in Xinjiang frequently observe UTC+6 (Xinjiang Time), 2 hours behind Beijing.))
- Website: www.tmg.gov.cn

Tiemenguan City

Chinese name
- Simplified Chinese: 铁门关
- Traditional Chinese: 鐵門關
Transcriptions
Standard Mandarin
- Hanyu Pinyin: Tiěménguān

Uyghur name
- Uyghur: باشئەگىم
Transcriptions
- Latin Yëziqi: Bashegim
- Yengi Yeziⱪ: Baxəgim
- SASM/GNC: Baxagim
- Siril Yëziqi: Башәгим

Tiemenguan (Chinese: 铁门关) is a county-level city in Xinjiang Uyghur Autonomous Region, China. It is located 50 kilometres (31 mi) west of Korla and 500 kilometres (310 mi) southwest of the regional capital Ürümqi.

Tiemenguan is the headquarter of the 2nd Division of Xinjiang Production and Construction Corps and currently administered by the 2nd Division. The city implemented the "division and city integration" (师市合一, shī shì héyī) management system, it shares the same leader group with the 2nd Division.

== Overview ==
Tiemenguan governs an area of 590.27 square kilometres (227.90 sq mi) and has a population of 200,000. The seat of the city is at the settlement of the 29th Regiment of the Second Division of XPCC. The settlement of the 28th Regiment has been named Boghux Town (博古其镇), and that of the 30th Regiment, Shuangfeng Town (双丰镇). Both are under the administration of Tiemenguan.

== History ==
The city was formerly one of the settled and cultivated areas of the 2nd Division of the Xinjiang Production and Construction Corps (XPCC), which was converted to a city in December 2012, when the State Council of China approved the establishment of Tiemenguan City. It is the sixth city in Xinjiang converted from XPCC land, after Shihezi, Aral, Tumxuk, Wujiaqu, and Beitun. Like the other cities, it is a county-level city directly administered by the Xinjiang Autonomous Region without an intervening prefectural government. The city is named after the nearby Iron Gate Pass (Tiemen Guan in Chinese).

== Administrative divisions ==
Tiemenguan contains 1 subdistrict, 9 towns, and 1 township-equivalent region:

Name	Simplified Chinese	Hanyu Pinyin	Uyghur (UEY)	Uyghur Latin (ULY)	Administrative division code	Notes
Subdistrict
Yingbin Subdistrict	迎宾街道	Yíngbīn Jiēdào			659006001	
Towns
Boghux Town (29th Regiment Farm)*	博古其镇 (二十九团)	Bógǔqí Zhèn	بوغۇش بازىرى	Boghush baziri	659006100	Administered by the 29th Regiment and the 28th Regiment.
Shuangfeng Town (30th Regiment Farm)*	双丰镇 (三十团)	Shuāngfēng Zhèn	قوشمولھوسۇل بازىرى	Qoshmolhosul baziri	659006101	
Hepan Town (22nd Regiment Farm)*	河畔镇 (二十二团)	Hépàn Zhèn			659006102	Administered by the 22nd Regiment and the 23rd Regiment. Separated from Hejing County in January 2020.
Gaoqiao Town (24th Regiment Farm)*	高桥镇 (二十四团)	Gāoqiáo Zhèn			659006103	Separated from Hoxud County in January 2020.
Tianhu Town (27th Regiment Farm)*	天湖镇 (二十七团)	Tiānhú Zhèn			659006104	Administered by the 27th Regiment and the 26th Regiment. Separated from Yanqi Hui Autonomous County in January 2020.
Kaize Town (223rd Regiment Farm)*	开泽镇 (二二三团)	Kāizé Zhèn			659006105	Separated from Hejing County in January 2020.
Milan Town (36th Regiment Farm)*	米兰镇 (三十六团)	Mǐlán Zhèn	مىرەن بازىرى	Miren baziri	659006106	de facto administered by the 4th Division since October 2017; Separated from Hoxud County in January 2020.
Jinshan Town (37th Regiment Farm)*	金山镇 (三十七团)	Jīnshān Zhèn	جىنشەن بازىرى		659006107	Separated from Qarqan County in January 2020.
Nantun Town (38th Regiment Farm)*	南屯镇 (三十八团)	Nántún Zhèn	نەنتۇن بازىرى		659006108	Separated from Qarqan County in January 2020.
township-equivalent region
Tiemenguan City Economic and Technological Development Zone	铁门关市经济技术开发区	Tiěménguān Shì Jīngjì Jìshù Kāifāqū			659006501	
* One institution with two names. See also Tuntian#People's Republic of China.
