= Xinxing, Xinjiang =

Xinxing 新星市 (Chinese) يېڭى يۇلتۇز شەھىرى (Uyghur)
- County-level city
- Location in Xinjiang Xinxing (Xinjiang) Xinxing (China)
- Coordinates: 42°47′43″N 93°44′47″E
- Country: China
- Autonomous region: Xinjiang
- Established: February 2021
- Municipal seat: Huangtian Town (Huangtian Farm)

Government
  - CCP Secretary: Yang Hongbin (Political Commissar of the 13th Division)
  - Mayor: Iminjan Islam (Commander of the 13th Division)

Area
  - Total: 539 km^{2} (208 sq mi)

Population (2021)
  - Total: 44,700
  - Density: 82.9/km^{2} (215/sq mi)
- Time zone: UTC+8 (China Standard (Note: Locals in Xinjiang frequently observe UTC+6 (Xinjiang Time), 2 hours behind Beijing.))
- Website: www.btnsss.gov.cn

Xinxing is a county-level city in the Xinjiang Uyghur Autonomous Region, China. It is actually located with enclaves in Hami.

Xinxing is the headquarter of the 13th Division of Xinjiang Production and Construction Corps and currently administered by the 13th Division. The city implemented the "division and city integration" (师市合一, shī shì héyī) management system and shares the same leader group with the 13th Division.

== History ==
In September 2018, the research team of the Civil Affairs Bureau of the Xinjiang Production and Construction Corps went to the 13rd Division of the Xinjiang Production and Construction Corps to investigate the proposed Xinxing. In December 2020, a report meeting on the overall planning results of the proposed Xinxing will be held. At the meeting, experts from the Henan Provincial Urban and Rural Planning and Design Institute Co., Ltd. will report on the overall urban design and regulatory detailed planning results of the overall planning of Xinxing.

On February 4, 2021, the People's Government of the Xinjiang Uygur Autonomous Region announced that with the approval of the State Council, the establishment of Xinxing City was approved, No. 57, Lanxin East Road, Huangtian Farm, 13th Division, Xinxing Municipal People's Government. Xinxing consists of the original Huangtian Farm, Red Star No. 1, Red Star No. 4, Red Star No. 2 Ranch, and Hongshan Gardening No. 2, The total area is 539.76 square kilometers. The scope of the central city: East to Bingdi Integration Avenue, west to Xihuan Road, south to South Damo Road, north to China National Highway 312. The planned area is 32 square kilometers.

== Administrative divisions ==
Xinxing contains 3 towns and 1 core area:

Name	Simplified Chinese	Hanyu Pinyin	Uyghur (UEY)	Uyghur Latin (ULY)	Administrative division code
Towns
Erdaohu Town (Red Star No. 1 Farm)*	二道湖镇 (红星一场)	Èrdàohú Zhèn			659011100
Luoyi Town (Red Star No. 4 Farm)*	骆驿镇 (红星四场)	Luòyì Zhèn			659011101
Huangtian Town (Huangtian Farm)*	黄田镇 (黄田农场)	Huángtián Zhèn	ساقا (خۇاڭتيەن) بازىرى		659011102
core area
Xinxing City Core Area	新星市核心区	Xīnxīng Shì Héxīnqū			659011400
* One institution with two names. See also Tuntian#People's Republic of China.
