= Baiyang, Xinjiang =

Baiyang 白杨市 (Chinese) بەيياڭ شەھىرى (Uyghur) بايياڭ قالاسى (Kazakh)
- County-level city
- Interactive map of Baiyang
- Location in Xinjiang Baiyang (Xinjiang) Baiyang (China)
- Coordinates: 46°43′28″N 82°53′45″E
- Country: China
- Autonomous region: Xinjiang
- Established: January 20, 2023
- Municipal seat: 163rd Regiment Farm

Government
  - CCP Secretary: vacant (Political Commissar of the 9th Division)
  - Mayor: Hu Xiaojiang (Commander of the 9th Division)

Area
  - Total: 4,928 km^{2} (1,903 sq mi)

Population (2019)
  - Total: 85,655
  - Density: 17.38/km^{2} (45.02/sq mi)
- Time zone: UTC+8 (China Standard (Note: Locals in Xinjiang frequently observe UTC+6 (Xinjiang Time), 2 hours behind Beijing.))
- Website: www.njs.gov.cn

Baiyang is a county-level city and a sub-prefectural-level city in Xinjiang Uyghur Autonomous Region, China. The county-level city implemented "division and city integration" (师市合一, shī shì héyī) with the 9th Division of the Xinjiang Production and Construction Corps. It is actually located with enclaves in Tacheng, and was established on January 20, 2023.

== Administrative divisions ==
Baiyang contains 4 township-equivalent regions:

Name	Simplified Chinese	Hanyu Pinyin	Uyghur (UEY)	Uyghur Latin (ULY)	Administrative division code
township-equivalent regions
161st Regiment Farm	一六一团	161 Tuán	161-تۇەن	161-tuen	
163rd Regiment Farm	一六三团	163 Tuán	163-تۇەن	163-tuen	
164th Regiment Farm	一六四团	164 Tuán	164-تۇەن	164-tuen	
165th Regiment Farm	一六五团	165 Tuán	165-تۇەن	165-tuen	
See also Tuntian#People's Republic of China.
