= Li Xu (born 1973) =

Chinese politician (born 1973)

- 李旭

Deputy Commander of the Xinjiang Production and Construction Corps (Deputy General Manager of China Xinjian Group)
- In office June 2022 – January 2026

Personal details
- Born: February 1973 (age 53)
- Party: Chinese Communist Party (expelled in 2026)

Li Xu (Chinese: 李旭; born February 1973) is a former Chinese politician, who served as the deputy commander of the Xinjiang Production and Construction Corps from 2022 to 2026.

== Career ==
Li was based in Beijing previously, and he started to serve as a Xinjiang aid official in August 2011. He served as the deputy commander of the 12th Division of Xinjiang Production and Construction Corps in the first aid year. His aid mission was ended in September 2014 originally, but he applied for another 3 years of aid to Xinjiang. In 2017, Li was served as the party secretary of the Water Resources Bureau (Aquatic Products Bureau) of the XPCC. He also served as the executive deputy head of the organization department of the XPCC Party Committee.

In June 2022, Li was appointed as the deputy commander of the XPCC.

== Investigation ==
On 8 January 2026, Li was put under investigation for alleged "serious violations of discipline and laws" by the Central Commission for Discipline Inspection (CCDI), the party's internal disciplinary body, and the National Supervisory Commission, the highest anti-corruption agency of China. Li was expelled from the party and dismissed from public office on 11 September.
