= Bai Yang =

Bai Yang may refer to:

- Bai Yang (actress) (1920–1996), Chinese actress
- Bo Yang (1920–2008), also known as Bai Yang, Chinese/Taiwanese scholar, writer and politician
- Bai Yang (table tennis) (born 1984), Chinese table tennis player
- Bai Yang (footballer) (born 1998), Chinese footballer

== See also ==
- Baiyang (disambiguation)
- Bai Yan (disambiguation)
