= Beitun =

Beitun may refer to:

- Beitun District (北屯區), Taichung, Taiwan
- Beitun, Xinjiang (北屯市), county-level city
