= Kokdala =

Kokdala 可克达拉市 (Chinese) كۆكدالا شەھىرى (Uyghur) كوكدالا قالاسى (Kazakh)
- County-level city
- Interactive map of Kokdala
- Location in Xinjiang Kokdala (Xinjiang) Kokdala (China)
- Coordinates: 43°56′41″N 81°02′40″E
- Country: China
- Autonomous region: Xinjiang
- Established: March 18, 2015
- Municipal seat: Jinshan Subdistrict

Government
  - CCP Secretary: Li Chengsheng (Political Commissar of the 4th Division)
  - Mayor: Cao Ping (Commander of the 4th Division)

Area
  - Total: 979.71 km^{2} (378.27 sq mi)

Population (2020)
  - Total: 69,524
  - Density: 70.964/km^{2} (183.80/sq mi)
- Time zone: UTC+8 (China Standard (Note: Locals in Xinjiang frequently observe UTC+6 (Xinjiang Time), 2 hours behind Beijing.))
- Postal code: 835213
- Website: www.cocodala.gov.cn

Kokdala

Chinese name
- Simplified Chinese: 可克达拉
- Traditional Chinese: 可克達拉
Transcriptions
Standard Mandarin
- Hanyu Pinyin: Kěkèdálā

Uyghur name
- Uyghur: كۆكدالا
Transcriptions
- Latin Yëziqi: Kökdala
- Yengi Yeziⱪ: Kɵkdala
- SASM/GNC: Kokdala
- Siril Yëziqi: Көкдала

Kokdala or Cocodala is a city in northern Xinjiang, China, bordering Kazakhstan's Almaty Region to the west. Administratively, it is a county-level city under the direct administration of the regional government, though it is geographically located in the Ili Kazakh Autonomous Prefecture. Kokdala is the headquarter of the 4th Division of Xinjiang Production and Construction Corps and currently administered by the 4th Division. The city implemented the "division and city integration" (师市合一, shī shì héyī) management system, it shares the same leader group with the 4th Division.

On March 18, 2015, Kokdala was created as the eighth city of the Xinjiang Production and Construction Corps. The city covers a land area of 980 square km and has a population of around 80,000.

== Administrative divisions ==
Kokdala contains 2 subdistricts, 5 towns, and 1 core area:

Name	Simplified Chinese	Hanyu Pinyin	Uyghur (UEY)	Uyghur Latin (ULY)	Administrative division code
Subdistricts
Jinshan Subdistrict	金山街道	Jīnshān Jiēdào			659008001
Huacheng Subdistrict	花城街道	Huāchéng Jiēdào			659008002
Towns
Yushuzhuang Town (63rd Regiment Farm)*	榆树庄镇 (六十三团)	Yúshùzhuāng Zhèn			659008100
Weihu Town (64th Regiment Farm)*	苇湖镇 (六十四团)	Wěihú Zhèn			659008101
Changfeng Town (68th Regiment Farm)*	长丰镇 (六十八团)	Chángfēng Zhèn			659008102
Jinliang Town (66th Regiment Farm)*	金梁镇 (六十六团)	Jīnliáng Zhèn			659008103
Jintun Town (67th Regiment Farm)*	金屯镇 (六十七团)	Jīntún Zhèn			659008104
core area
Kokdala City Cora Area	可克达拉市核心区	Kěkèdálā Shì Héxīnqū			659008400
* One institution with two names. See also Tuntian#People's Republic of China.
