= Caohu =

Caohu 草湖市 (Chinese) ساۋخۇ شەھىرى (Uyghur)
- County-level city
- Coordinates: 41.40°N 84.19°E
- Country: China
- Autonomous region: Xinjiang
- County seat: Caohu Town
- Time zone: UTC+8 (China Standard)

Caohu (Chinese: 草湖市) is a county-level city in the western part of Xinjiang, China. It was established on April 17, 2026. The city is incorporated with 41st Regiment Farm of 3rd Division of Xinjiang Production and Construction Corps.

== History ==
The city was formerly Caohu Town of Tumxuk City. On April 17, 2026, the people's government of Xinjiang Uygur Autonomous Region announced the establishment of Caohu City. The city is directly administered by the autonomous region.
