= Kunyu, Xinjiang =

Kunyu 昆玉市 (Chinese) قۇرۇمقاش شەھىرى (Uyghur)
- County-level city
- Interactive map of Kunyu
- Location in Xinjiang Kunyu (Xinjiang) Kunyu (China)
- Coordinates: 37°12′34″N 79°17′27″E
- Country: China
- Autonomous region: Xinjiang
- Established: 26 February 2016
- Municipal seat: Yudu Subdistrict

Government
  - CCP Secretary: Jiang Xin (Political Commissar of the 14th Division)
  - Mayor: vacant (Commander of the 14th Division)

Area
  - Total: 687.13 km^{2} (265.30 sq mi)

Population (2020)
  - Total: 63,487
  - Density: 92.394/km^{2} (239.30/sq mi)
- Time zone: UTC+8 (China Standard Time (Note: Locals in Xinjiang frequently observe UTC+6 (Xinjiang Time), 2 hours behind Beijing.))
- Area code: 0903
- Website: www.btdsss.gov.cn

Kunyu, Xinjiang

Chinese name
- Simplified Chinese: 昆玉
- Traditional Chinese: 崑玉
Transcriptions
Standard Mandarin
- Hanyu Pinyin: Kūnyù

Alternative Chinese name
- Simplified Chinese: 库鲁木喀什
- Traditional Chinese: 庫魯木喀什
Transcriptions
Standard Mandarin
- Hanyu Pinyin: Kùlǔmùkāshí

Uyghur name
- Uyghur: قۇرۇمقاش
Transcriptions
- Latin Yëziqi: Qurumqash
- Yengi Yeziⱪ: Kurumkax
- SASM/GNC: Kurumkax
- Siril Yëziqi: Қурумқаш

Kunyu (Chinese: 昆玉), also known as Kurumkash (Uyghur: قۇرۇمقاش), is a county-level city in Xinjiang Uyghur Autonomous Region, China. It is geographically located in Hotan Prefecture of Southern Xinjiang, but is de jure directly administered by the Xinjiang regional government.

Kunyu is the headquarter of the 14th Division of Xinjiang Production and Construction Corps and currently administered by the 14th Division. The city implemented the "division and city integration" (师市合一, shī shì héyī) management system, it shares the same leader group with the 14th Division.

== Overview ==
The city was formerly the settled and cultivated areas of the 224th Regiment of the 14th Division of the Xinjiang Production and Construction Corps (XPCC). In January 2016, the State Council of China approved the establishment of Kunyu City and it was officially established on 26 February 2016. It covers an area of 687.13 square kilometres (265.30 sq mi), is located 78 kilometres (48 mi) from Hotan city and is known for its Hotan dates.

"Regiment One Pasture" (兵团一牧场), located within Qira County, is part of Kunyu.

"Regiment 225" (兵团二二五团), located within Yutian/Keriya County, is part of Kunyu.

== Administrative divisions ==
Kunyu contains 1 subdistrict, 5 towns, and 1 township-equivalent region:

Name	Simplified Chinese	Hanyu Pinyin	Uyghur (UEY)	Uyghur Latin (ULY)	Administrative division code
Subdistrict
Yudu Subdistrict	玉都街道	Yùdū Jiēdào			659009001
Towns
Laobing Town (47th Regiment Farm)*	老兵镇 (四十七团)	Lǎobīng Zhèn			659009100
Kunquan Town (Pishan Farm)*	昆泉镇 (皮山农场)	Kūnquán Zhèn			659009101
Kunmu Town (1st Pasture)*	昆牧镇 (一牧场)	Kūnmù Zhèn			659009102
Yuquan Town (225th Regiment Farm)*	玉泉镇 (二二五团)	Yùquán Zhèn	يۈچۈەن بازىرى	Yüchüen baziri	659009103
Yuyuan Town (224th Regiment Farm)*	玉园镇 (二二四团)	Yùyuán Zhèn			659009104
Township-equivalent region
Kunyu Economic and Technological Development Zone	昆玉经济技术开发区	Kūnyù Jīngjì Jìshù Kāifāqū			659009501
* One institution with two names. See also Tuntian#People's Republic of China.
