= Baiyang =

Baiyang may refer to:

- Baiyang Lake, lake in Hebei, China
- Baiyang River, river in Xinjiang, China
- Baiyang, Zhijiang (白洋镇), in Zhijiang, Yichang, Hubei, China
- Baiyang Subdistrict, in Wuxi County, Chongqing, China
- Baiyang, Xinjiang, county-level city in Xinjiang, China
