= Xinjiang Chalkis =

Chinese agricultural company

Xinjiang Chalkis Company Ltd (Chinese: 中基健康产业股份有限公司) is a major Chinese agricultural company that processes tomatoes and fruits, founded in 1994. It also produces conical barrels and wooden ton-boxes. It is headquartered in Urumqi, Xinjiang, China.

Xinjiang Chalkis is an export-oriented state-owned enterprise that is supported and developed by the Xinjiang Production and Construction Corps, affiliated to the 6th division. It was established in May 2000 with a registered capital of 371.7 million yuan. The production facilities are mainly located in Xinjiang, Inner Mongolia and Tianjin.

By the end of 2005, the company had total assets worth 2.137 billion yuan and an annual sales revenue of more than 700 million yuan. Over 95% of the company's products are exported to the international market. Since 2004, its products constitute 18% of the world's tomato sauce trading volume. Its small-can tomato sauce products account for 60% of the African market share. Since 2009, the company has heavily invested in tomato harvesting mechanization, and harvesting machine leasing is a minor revenue line.

== Officers ==
- Chairman of the Board - Liu Hong (刘洪) as of December 2023
- Vice Chairman of the Board - Wu Ming as of 27 May 2013
