= Renmin Road Subdistrict, Wujiaqu =

Renmin Road Subdistrict 人民路街道
- Subdistrict
- Location in Xinjiang
- Coordinates: 44°10′29″N 87°31′41″E
- Country: China
- Autonomous region: Xinjiang
- Sub-prefectural city: Wujiaqu
- Time zone: UTC+8 (China Standard Time)

Renmin Road Subdistrict (Chinese: 人民路街道; pinyin: Rénmínlù Jiēdào) is a subdistrict situated in Dawukou District, Wujiaqu, Xinjiang, China. As of 2020, it administers the following seven residential neighborhoods:

- Qinghunan Road Community (青湖南路社区)
- Dongcheng Community (东城社区)
- Longquan Community (龙泉社区)
- Beihaidong Street Community (北海东街社区)

== See also ==
- List of township-level divisions of Xinjiang
