= Bai Yan =

Bai Yan is the name of:

- Bai Yan (actor) (1920–2019), Singaporean actor
- Bai Yan (tennis) (born 1989), Chinese tennis player

== See also ==
- Bai Yang (disambiguation)
