= Wujiaqu =

Wujiaqu 五家渠市 (Chinese) ۋۇجياچۈ شەھىرى (Uyghur)
- County-level city
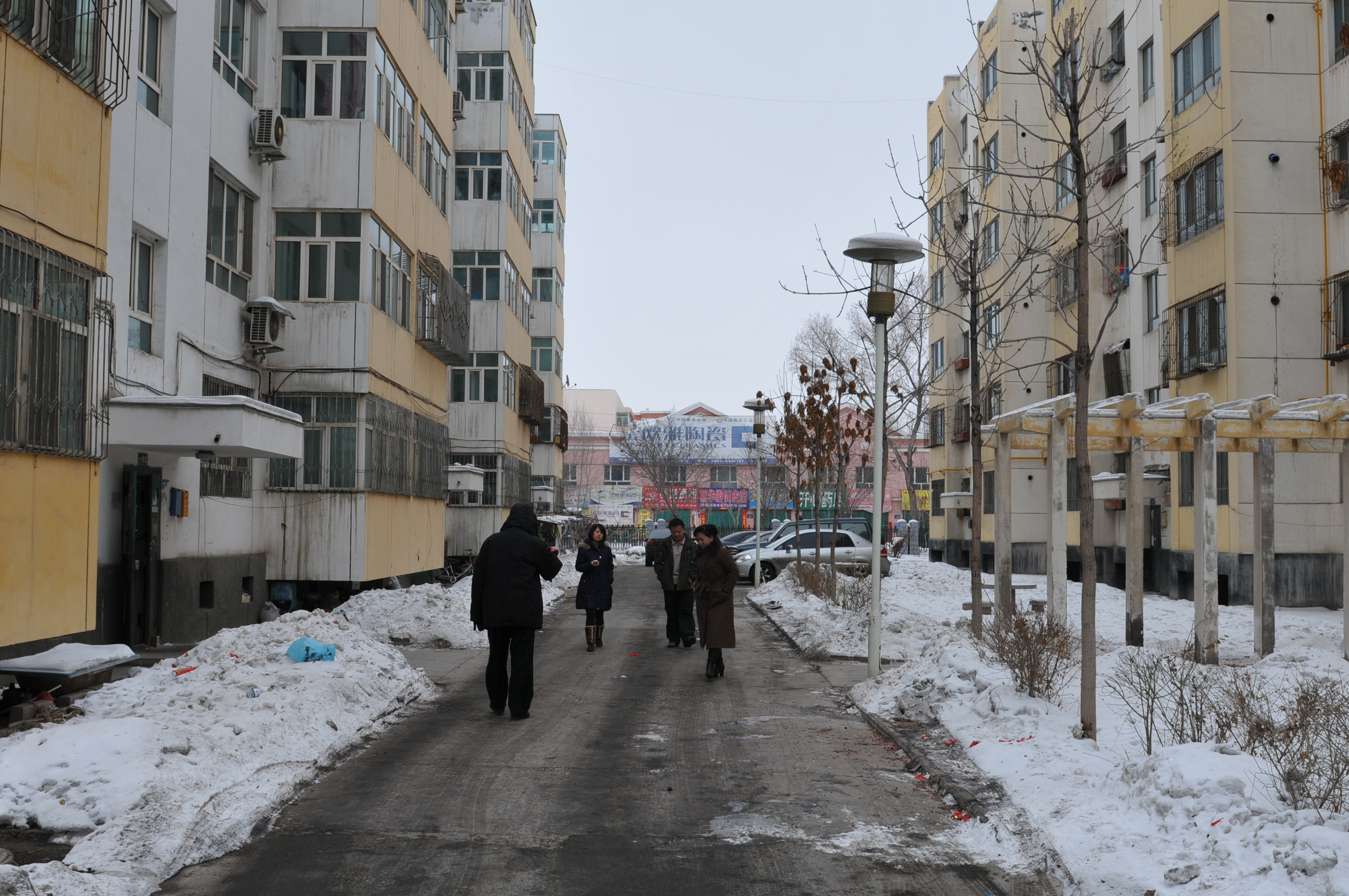

- Wujiaqu (red) in Xinjiang (orange)

- Location of the city centre in Xinjiang Wujiaqu (Xinjiang) Wujiaqu (China)
- Coordinates: 44°10′01″N 87°32′35″E
- Country: China
- Autonomous region: Xinjiang
- Municipal seat: Renmin Road Subdistrict

Government
  - CCP Secretary: Song Hongli (Political Commissar of the 6th Division)
  - Mayor: Jing Dawei (Commander of the 6th Division)

Area
  - Total: 742 km^{2} (286 sq mi)

Population (2022)
  - Total: 154,400
  - Density: 208/km^{2} (539/sq mi)
- Time zone: UTC+8 (China Standard (Note: Locals in Xinjiang frequently observe UTC+6 (Xinjiang Time), 2 hours behind Beijing.))
- Website: www.wjq.gov.cn

Wujiaqu

Chinese name
- Chinese: 五家渠
Transcriptions
Standard Mandarin
- Hanyu Pinyin: Wǔjiāqú

Uyghur name
- Uyghur: ۋۇجياچۈ
Transcriptions
- Latin Yëziqi: Wujyachü
- Yengi Yeziⱪ: Wujyaqü
- SASM/GNC: Wujyaqü
- Siril Yëziqi: Вуҗйачу

Wujiaqu (Chinese: 五家渠) is a county-level city in the northern part of Xinjiang Uyghur Autonomous Region, China, about 40 kilometres (25 mi) north of Ürümqi.

Wujiaqu is the headquarter of the 6th Division of Xinjiang Production and Construction Corps and currently administered by the 6th Division. The city implemented the "division and city integration" (师市合一, shī shì héyī) management system, it shares the same leader group with the 6th Division.

== Administrative divisions ==
Wujiaqu contains 3 subdistricts, 3 towns, and 1 township-equivalent region.

Name	Simplified Chinese	Hanyu Pinyin	Uyghur (UEY)	Uyghur Latin (ULY)	Administrative division code
Subdistricts
Junken Road Subdistrict	军垦路街道	Jūnkěnlù Jiēdào	جۈنكېن يولى كوچا باشقارمىسى	Jünkën yoli kocha bashqarmisi	659004001
Qinghu Road Subdistrict	青湖路街道	Qīnghúlù Jiēdào	چىڭخۇ يولى كوچا باشقارمىسى	Chingxu yoli kocha bashqarmisi	659004002
Renmin Road Subdistrict	人民路街道	Rénmínlù Jiēdào	خەلق يولى كوچا باشقارمىسى	Xelq yoli kocha bashqarmisi	659004003
Towns
Wutong Town (102nd Regiment Farm)*	梧桐镇 (一〇二团)	Wútóng Zhèn	ۋۇتۇڭ بازىرى	Wutung baziri	659004100
Caijiahu Town (103rd Regiment Farm)*	蔡家湖镇 (一〇三团)	Càijiāhú Zhèn	سەيجياخۇ بازىرى	Seyjyaxu baziri	659004101
Qinghu Town (101st Regiment Farm)*	青湖镇 (一〇一团)	Qīnghú Zhèn			659004102
township-equivalent region
Wujiaqu Economic and Technological Development Zone	五家渠经济技术开发区	Wǔjiāqú Jīngjì Jìshù Kāifāqū			659004501
* One institution with two names. See also Tuntian#People's Republic of China.

== Demographics ==
As of 2015, 89,695 (96.4%) of the 93,058 residents of the city were Han Chinese, 1,926 (2.1%) were Hui and 1,437 were from other ethnic groups.

Wujiaqu's population is around 96,000 and predominantly Han Chinese according to the 2010 census. There are also Hui and various other minorities.

Population by ethnicity – 2010 census

Ethnicity	Population	%
Han	92,372	95.79%
Hui	2,541	2.63%
Mongols	319	0.33%
Kazakhs	232	0.24%
Uyghur	223	0.23%
Tujia	167	0.17%
Manchu	128	0.13%
others	454	0.47%
Total	96,436	100%

Population by ethnicity – 2018 census

The proportion of nationalities in Wujiaqu City
Nationality	Percentage
Han People	96.3%
Hui People	2.1%
Mongols	0.5%
Uyghurs	0.1%
Kazakhs	0.1%
Others	0.9%
Source of the population statistics :

== Climate ==
Climate data for Caijiahu, Wujiaqu, elevation 441 m (1,447 ft), (1991–2020 normals)
Month	Jan	Feb	Mar	Apr	May	Jun	Jul	Aug	Sep	Oct	Nov	Dec	Year
Mean daily maximum °C (°F)	−13.3 (8.1)	−7.7 (18.1)	6.2 (43.2)	21.2 (70.2)	27.7 (81.9)	32.8 (91.0)	34.3 (93.7)	33.1 (91.6)	26.8 (80.2)	17.0 (62.6)	3.5 (38.3)	−9.7 (14.5)	14.3 (57.8)
Daily mean °C (°F)	−18.8 (−1.8)	−13.8 (7.2)	−0.3 (31.5)	12.7 (54.9)	19.3 (66.7)	24.5 (76.1)	25.9 (78.6)	23.9 (75.0)	17.4 (63.3)	8.2 (46.8)	−2.4 (27.7)	−14.4 (6.1)	6.9 (44.3)
Mean daily minimum °C (°F)	−23.6 (−10.5)	−19.3 (−2.7)	−6.2 (20.8)	4.9 (40.8)	11.1 (52.0)	16.3 (61.3)	18.0 (64.4)	15.5 (59.9)	8.9 (48.0)	1.1 (34.0)	−7.1 (19.2)	−18.5 (−1.3)	0.1 (32.2)
Average precipitation mm (inches)	6.6 (0.26)	6.5 (0.26)	8.0 (0.31)	17.4 (0.69)	16.2 (0.64)	17.4 (0.69)	19.7 (0.78)	14.5 (0.57)	9.8 (0.39)	11.6 (0.46)	12.1 (0.48)	10.2 (0.40)	150 (5.93)
Average precipitation days (≥ 0.1 mm)	7.8	6.6	4.0	4.8	5.8	6.0	6.3	5.2	3.9	4.3	5.4	8.1	68.2
Average snowy days	15.9	13.5	5.5	1.1	0	0	0	0	0	0.6	5.9	15.1	57.6
Average relative humidity (%)	80	81	71	46	41	44	48	48	48	59	77	83	61
Mean monthly sunshine hours	111.7	143.9	226.2	271.5	312.5	312.6	315.4	313.2	282.1	241.7	148.2	93.5	2,772.5
Percentage possible sunshine	38	48	60	66	68	68	68	74	77	73	52	34	61
Source: China Meteorological Administration

== See also ==
- Xinjiang Production and Construction Corps
