= County-level city =

People's Republic of China county-level subdivision

County-level city 县级市 Xiànjíshì
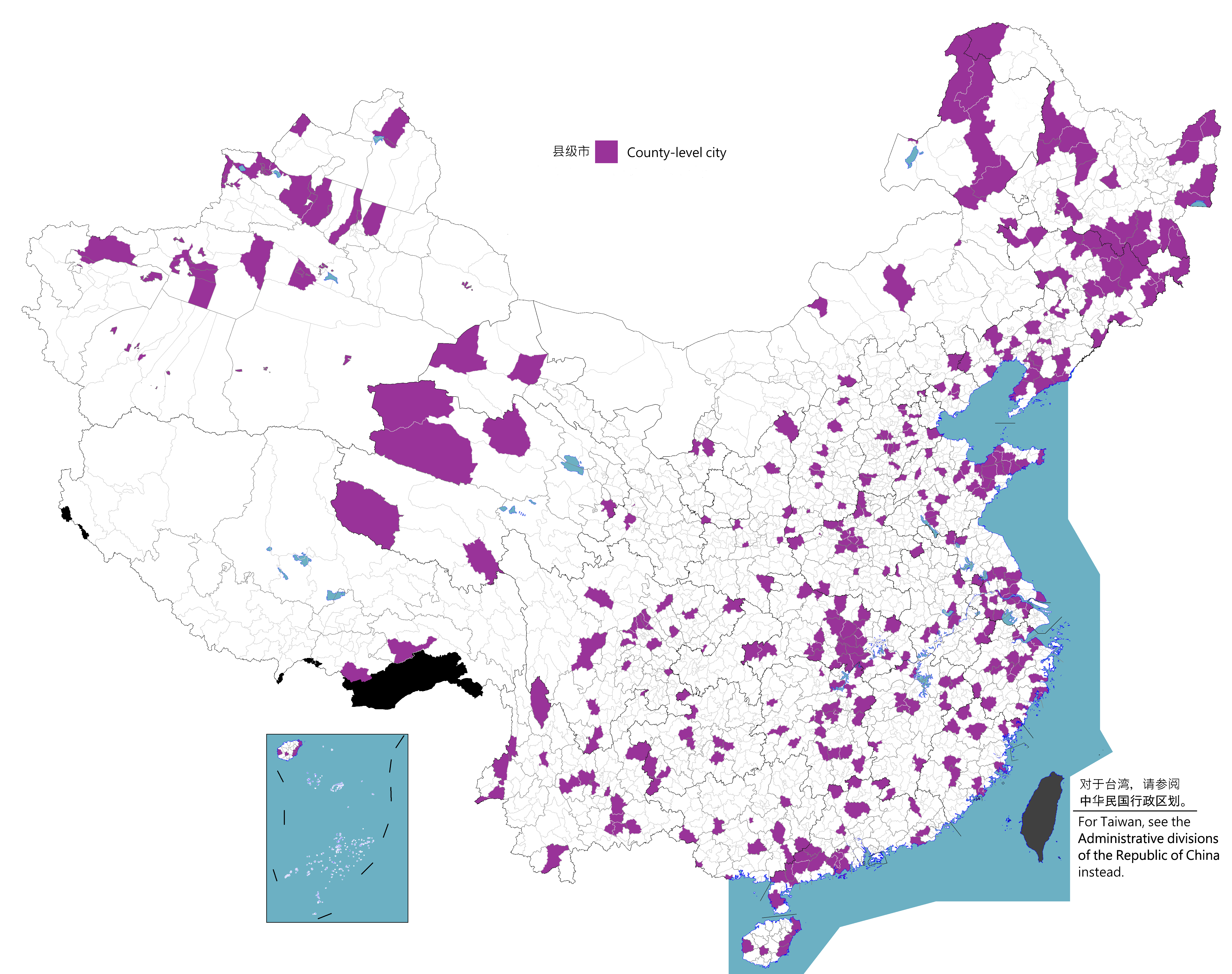
- Category: Third level administrative division of a unitary state
- Location: People's Republic of China
- Found in: Prefectures, Provinces
- Number: 398 (395 controlled, 3 claimed) (as of 17 April 2026)
- Populations: 15,124 (Tsona) – 2,054,703 (Puning)
- Areas: 89 km^{2} (34 sq mi) (Linxia) – 119,165 km^{2} (46,010 sq mi) (Golmud)
- Government: Various, Central Government
- Subdivisions: Town, Township

County-level city

Chinese name
- Simplified Chinese: 县级市
- Traditional Chinese: 縣級市
Transcriptions
Standard Mandarin
- Hanyu Pinyin: Xiànjíshì
- Wade–Giles: Hsien-chi-shih

Tibetan name
- Tibetan: རྫོང་རིམ་པ་གྲོང་ཁྱེར།
Transcriptions
- Wylie: dzong rim pa drong khyer
- Tibetan Pinyin: Zong Rimba Chongkyêr

Mongolian name
- Mongolian script: ᠬᠣᠰᠢᠭᠤᠨ ᠤ ᠡᠩ ᠲᠡᠢ ᠬᠣᠲᠠ
Transcriptions
- SASM/GNC: Hûshûûn û entei hôt

Uyghur name
- Uyghur: ناھىيىسى دەرىجىلىك شەھەر
Transcriptions
- Latin Yëziqi: Nahiyisi Derijilik Sheher

A county-level city (Chinese: 县级市) is a county-level administrative division of the People's Republic of China. County-level cities have judicial but no legislative rights over their own local law and are usually governed by prefecture-level divisions, but a few are governed directly by province-level divisions.

A county-level city is a "city" (市; shì) and "county" (县; xiàn) that have been merged into one unified jurisdiction. As such, it is simultaneously a city, which is a municipal entity, and a county, which is an administrative division of a prefecture. Most county-level cities were created in the 1980s and 1990s by replacing denser populated counties.

County-level cities are not "cities" in the strictest sense of the word, since they usually contain rural areas many times the size of their urban, built-up area. This is because the counties that county-level cities have replaced are themselves large administrative units containing towns, villages and farmland. To distinguish a "county-level city" from its actual urban area (the traditional meaning of the word "city"), the term "市区" (shìqū) or "urban area", is used.

== Comparable territorial divisions in other countries ==
While the idea of a "city" being a unit consisting of several "towns" is not a common one in English-speaking world, a somewhat similar naming convention is used for local government areas in some parts of Australia. For example, in New South Wales such a unit may often be called a "city" (rather than a traditional "shire"), and consist of "towns". E.g. City of Blue Mountains is made of a number of towns (Katoomba, Springwood, etc.).

== List ==
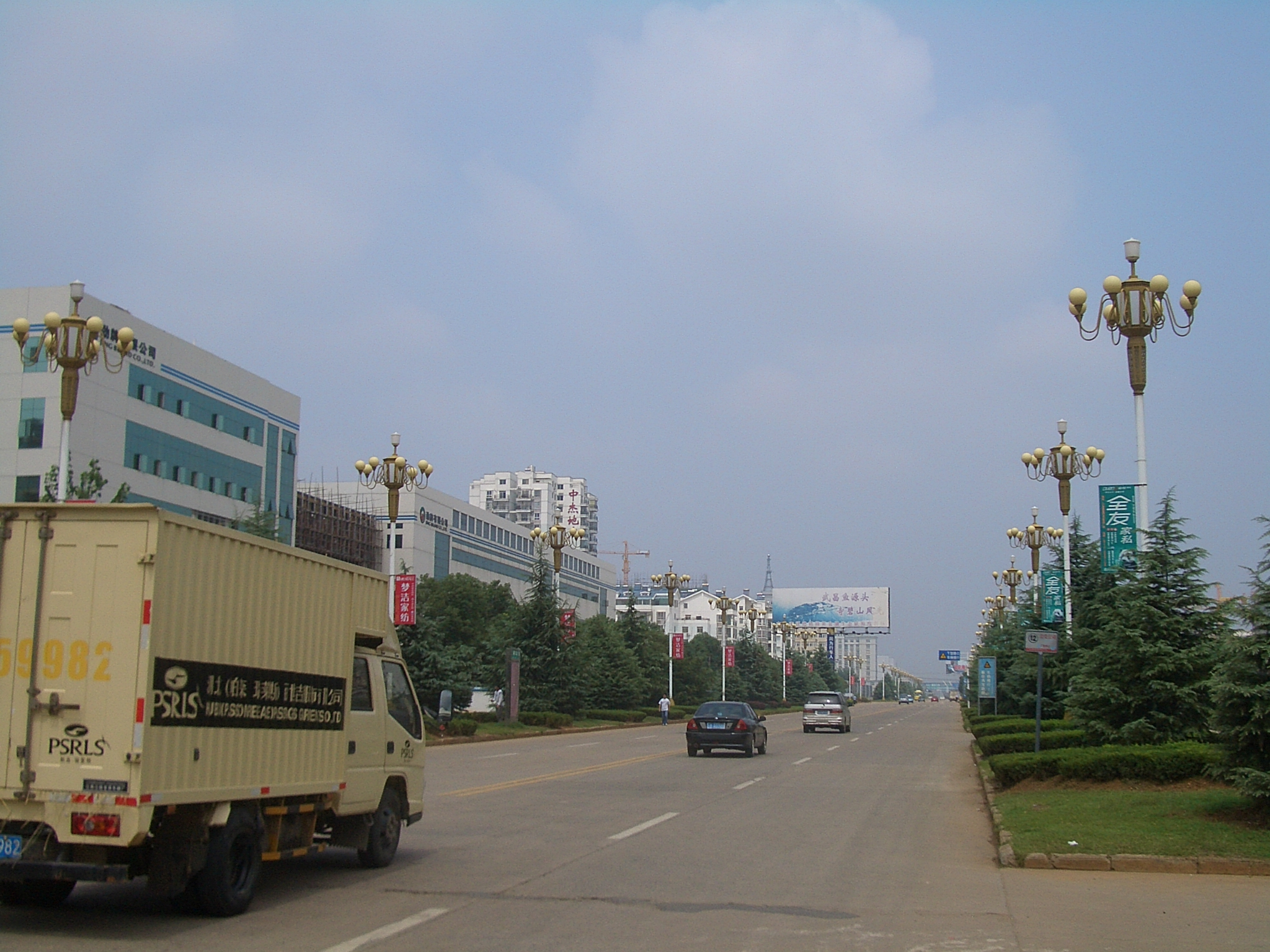
In the main urban area of Daye, a county-level city within the prefecture-level city of Huangshi, Hubei. Daye also includes some separate towns, such as Dajipu (大箕铺)

As of 3 April 2023, there are 408 county-level cities in total:

City	Chinese	Province	Prefecture	Area (km²)	Founded (PRC)
Chaohu	巢湖市	Anhui	Hefei	2,082	2011-07-14
Guangde	广德市	Anhui	Xuancheng	2,165	2019-07-12
Jieshou	界首市	Anhui	Fuyang	666	1989-09-27
Mingguang	明光市	Anhui	Chuzhou	2,335	1994-05-31
Ningguo	宁国市	Anhui	Xuancheng	2,447	1997-03-11
Qianshan	潜山市	Anhui	Anqing	1,692	2018-07-02
Tianchang	天长市	Anhui	Chuzhou	1,770	1993-09-18
Tongcheng	桐城市	Anhui	Anqing	1,572	1996-08-20
Wuwei	无为市	Anhui	Wuhu	2,042	2019-11-20
Fu'an	福安市	Fujian	Ningde	1,880	1989-11-13
Fuding	福鼎市	Fujian	Ningde	1,526	1995-10-13
Fuqing	福清市	Fujian	Fuzhou	1,518	1990-12-26
Jian'ou	建瓯市	Fujian	Nanping	4,200	1992-10-20
Jinjiang	晋江市	Fujian	Quanzhou	642	1992-03-06
Longhai	龙海市	Fujian	Zhangzhou	1,115	1993-05-12
Nan'an	南安市	Fujian	Quanzhou	1,985	1993-05-12
Shaowu	邵武市	Fujian	Nanping	2,851	1983-08-17
Shishi	石狮市	Fujian	Quanzhou	160	1987-12-17
Wuyishan	武夷山市	Fujian	Nanping	2,814	1989-08-21
Yong'an	永安市	Fujian	Sanming	2,942	1984-09-12
Zhangping	漳平市	Fujian	Longyan	2,976	1990-08-15
Dunhuang	敦煌市	Gansu	Jiuquan	31,200	1987-08-21
Hezuo	合作市	Gansu	Gannan	2,670	1996-05-28
Huating	华亭市	Gansu	Pingliang	1,183	2018-07-02
Linxia	临夏市	Gansu	Linxia	89	1983-08-31
Yumen	玉门市	Gansu	Jiuquan	13,389	1961-11-15
Enping	恩平市	Guangdong	Jiangmen	1,698	1994-02-28
Gaozhou	高州市	Guangdong	Maoming	3,389	1993-06-08
Heshan	鹤山市	Guangdong	Jiangmen	1,083	1993-11-08
Huazhou	化州市	Guangdong	Maoming	2,404	1994-07-04
Kaiping	开平市	Guangdong	Jiangmen	1,659	1993-01-05
Lechang	乐昌市	Guangdong	Shaoguan	2,384	1994-04-28
Leizhou	雷州市	Guangdong	Zhanjiang	3,025	1994-04-26
Lianjiang	廉江市	Guangdong	Zhanjiang	2,543	1993-12-10
Lianzhou	连州市	Guangdong	Qingyuan	2,665	1994-04-22
Lufeng	陆丰市	Guangdong	Shanwei	1,777	1995-01-19
Luoding	罗定市	Guangdong	Yunfu	2,328	1993-04-08
Nanxiong	南雄市	Guangdong	Shaoguan	2,402	1996-06-17
Puning	普宁市	Guangdong	Jieyang	1,620	1993-04-06
Sihui	四会市	Guangdong	Zhaoqing	1,258	1993-11-25
Taishan	台山市	Guangdong	Jiangmen	3,296	1992-04-17
Wuchuan	吴川市	Guangdong	Zhanjiang	848	1994-05-26
Xingning	兴宁市	Guangdong	Meizhou	2,107	1994-06-06
Xinyi	信宜市	Guangdong	Maoming	3,081	1995-09-11
Yangchun	阳春市	Guangdong	Yangjiang	4,055	1994-05-05
Yingde	英德市	Guangdong	Qingyuan	5,671	1994-01-12
Beiliu	北流市	Guangxi	Yulin	2,457	1994-04-18
Cenxi	岑溪市	Guangxi	Wuzhou	2,783	1995-09-11
Dongxing	东兴市	Guangxi	Fangchenggang	590	1996-04-29
Guiping	桂平市	Guangxi	Guigang	4,074	1994-05-18
Hengzhou	横州市	Guangxi	Nanning	3,464	2021-01-20
Heshan	合山市	Guangxi	Laibin	365	1981-06-29
Jingxi	靖西市	Guangxi	Baise	3,232	2015-08-01
Lipu	荔浦市	Guangxi	Guilin	1,759	2018-07-02
Pingguo	平果市	Guangxi	Baise	2,485	2019-11-20
Pingxiang	凭祥市	Guangxi	Chongzuo	645	1961-05-27
Chishui	赤水市	Guizhou	Zunyi	1,801	1990-09-30
Duyun	都匀市	Guizhou	Qiannan	2,278	1966-03-09
Fuquan	福泉市	Guizhou	Qiannan	1,691	1996-12-02
Kaili	凯里市	Guizhou	Qiandongnan	1,570	1983-08-19
Panzhou	盘州市	Guizhou	Liupanshui	4,057	2017-04-09
Qianxi	黔西市	Guizhou	Bijie	2,380	2021-01-20
Qingzhen	清镇市	Guizhou	Guiyang	1,302	1992-11-06
Renhuai	仁怀市	Guizhou	Zunyi	1,788	1995-11-30
Xingren	兴仁市	Guizhou	Qianxinan	1,785	2018-07-02
Xingyi	兴义市	Guizhou	Qianxinan	2,911	1987-11-06
Dongfang	东方市	Hainan	none	2,272	1997-03-12
Qionghai	琼海市	Hainan	none	1,692	1992-11-06
Wanning	万宁市	Hainan	none	1,883	1996-08-05
Wenchang	文昌市	Hainan	none	2,486	1995-11-07
Wuzhishan	五指山市	Hainan	none	1,130	1986-06-12
Anguo	安国市	Hebei	Baoding	486	1991-05-06
Bazhou	霸州市	Hebei	Langfang	802	1990-01-04
Botou	泊头市	Hebei	Cangzhou	1,009	1982-12-13
Dingzhou	定州市	Hebei	Baoding	1,283	1986-03-05
Gaobeidian	高碑店市	Hebei	Baoding	618	1993-04-09
Hejian	河间市	Hebei	Cangzhou	1,333	1990-10-18
Huanghua	黄骅市	Hebei	Cangzhou	1,545	1989-07-27
Jinzhou	晋州市	Hebei	Shijiazhuang	619	1991-11-30
Luanzhou	滦州市	Hebei	Tangshan	1,027	2018-07-02
Nangong	南宫市	Hebei	Xingtai	861	1986-03-05
Pingquan	平泉市	Hebei	Chengde	3,294	2017-04-09
Qian'an	迁安市	Hebei	Tangshan	1,227	1996-10-10
Renqiu	任丘市	Hebei	Cangzhou	1,012	1986-03-05
Sanhe	三河市	Hebei	Langfang	634	1993-03-03
Shahe	沙河市	Hebei	Xingtai	859	1987-02-20
Shenzhou	深州市	Hebei	Hengshui	1,245	1994-07-04
Wu'an	武安市	Hebei	Handan	1,806	1988-09-01
Xinji	辛集市	Hebei	Shijiazhuang	951	1986-03-05
Xinle	新乐市	Hebei	Shijiazhuang	525	1992-10-08
Zhuozhou	涿州市	Hebei	Baoding	751	1986-09-24
Zunhua	遵化市	Hebei	Tangshan	1,509	1992-02-17
Anda	安达市	Heilongjiang	Suihua	3,586	1984-11-17
Bei'an	北安市	Heilongjiang	Heihe	7,194	1982-12-18
Dongning	东宁市	Heilongjiang	Mudanjiang	7,117	2015-12-15
Fujin	富锦市	Heilongjiang	Jiamusi	8,224	1988-08-30
Fuyuan	抚远市	Heilongjiang	Jiamusi	6,047	2016-01-13
Hailin	海林市	Heilongjiang	Mudanjiang	8,816	1992-07-28
Hailun	海伦市	Heilongjiang	Suihua	4,667	1989-12-23
Hulin	虎林市	Heilongjiang	Jixi	9,334	1996-10-11
Mishan	密山市	Heilongjiang	Jixi	7,731	1988-11-17
Mohe	漠河市	Heilongjiang	Daxing'anling	18,367	2018-02-22
Muling	穆棱市	Heilongjiang	Mudanjiang	6,247	1995-03-07
Nehe	讷河市	Heilongjiang	Qiqihar	6,664	1992-09-02
Nenjiang	嫩江市	Heilongjiang	Heihe	15,109	2019-07-12
Ning'an	宁安市	Heilongjiang	Mudanjiang	7,227	1993-02-12
Shangzhi	尚志市	Heilongjiang	Harbin	8,891	1988-09-14
Suifenhe	绥芬河市	Heilongjiang	Mudanjiang	422	1975-08-15
Tieli	铁力市	Heilongjiang	Yichun	6,443	1988-09-13
Tongjiang	同江市	Heilongjiang	Jiamusi	6,229	1987-02-24
Wuchang	五常市	Heilongjiang	Harbin	7,512	1993-06-01
Wudalianchi	五大连池市	Heilongjiang	Heihe	9,874	1983-10-08
Zhaodong	肇东市	Heilongjiang	Suihua	4,330	1986-09-08
Changge	长葛市	Henan	Xuchang	650	1993-12-14
Changyuan	长垣市	Henan	Xinxiang	1,051	2019-07-12
Dengfeng	登封市	Henan	Zhengzhou	1,220	1994-05-30
Dengzhou	邓州市	Henan	Nanyang	2,294	1988-11-17
Gongyi	巩义市	Henan	Zhengzhou	1,041	1991-06-12
Huixian	辉县市	Henan	Xinxiang	2,007	1988-10-11
Jiyuan	济源市	Henan	none	1,965	1988-06-25
Lingbao	灵宝市	Henan	Sanmenxia	3,011	1993-05-12
Linzhou	林州市	Henan	Anyang	2,046	1994-01-24
Mengzhou	孟州市	Henan	Jiaozuo	542	1996-04-29
Qinyang	沁阳市	Henan	Jiaozuo	623	1989-09-27
Ruzhou	汝州市	Henan	Pingdingshan	1,573	1988-06-25
Weihui	卫辉市	Henan	Xinxiang	882	1988-10-08
Wugang	舞钢市	Henan	Pingdingshan	640	1990-09-04
Xiangcheng	项城市	Henan	Zhoukou	1,083	1993-12-16
Xingyang	荥阳市	Henan	Zhengzhou	955	1994-04-05
Xinmi	新密市	Henan	Zhengzhou	1,001	1994-04-05
Xinzheng	新郑市	Henan	Zhengzhou	873	1994-05-16
Yanshi	偃师市	Henan	Luoyang	888	1993-12-15
Yima	义马市	Henan	Sanmenxia	112	1981-04-04
Yongcheng	永城市	Henan	Shangqiu	2,068	1996-10-11
Yuzhou	禹州市	Henan	Xuchang	1,472	1988-06-25
Anlu	安陆市	Hubei	Xiaogan	1,355	1987-09-04
Chibi	赤壁市	Hubei	Xianning	1,723	1986-05-27
Dangyang	当阳市	Hubei	Yichang	2,159	1988-10-22
Danjiangkou	丹江口市	Hubei	Shiyan	3,121	1983-08-19
Daye	大冶市	Hubei	Huangshi	1,566	1994-02-18
Enshi	恩施市	Hubei	Enshi	3,972	1981-11-07
Guangshui	广水市	Hubei	Suizhou	2,647	1988-10-11
Hanchuan	汉川市	Hubei	Xiaogan	1,663	1997-03-12
Honghu	洪湖市	Hubei	Jingzhou	2,519	1987-07-31
Jianli	监利市	Hubei	Jingzhou	3,118	2020-06-12
Jingshan	京山市	Hubei	Jingmen	3,284	2018-02-22
Laohekou	老河口市	Hubei	Xiangyang	1,032	1979-11-16
Lichuan	利川市	Hubei	Enshi	4,603	1986-05-27
Macheng	麻城市	Hubei	Huanggang	3,599	1986-05-27
Qianjiang	潜江市	Hubei	none	2,004	1988-05-25
Shishou	石首市	Hubei	Jingzhou	1,427	1986-05-27
Songzi	松滋市	Hubei	Jingzhou	2,235	1995-12-29
Tianmen	天门市	Hubei	none	2,622	1987-08-03
Wuxue	武穴市	Hubei	Huanggang	1,246	1987-10-23
Xiantao	仙桃市	Hubei	none	2,538	1986-05-27
Yicheng	宜城市	Hubei	Xiangyang	2,115	1994-06-10
Yidu	宜都市	Hubei	Yichang	1,357	1987-11-30
Yingcheng	应城市	Hubei	Xiaogan	1,103	1986-05-27
Zaoyang	枣阳市	Hubei	Xiangyang	3,277	1988-01-08
Zhijiang	枝江市	Hubei	Yichang	1,310	1996-07-30
Zhongxiang	钟祥市	Hubei	Jingmen	4,488	1992-05-20
Changning	常宁市	Hunan	Hengyang	2,048	1996-11-26
Hongjiang	洪江市	Hunan	Huaihua	2,283	1979-09-01
Jinshi	津市市	Hunan	Changde	556	1979-12-19
Jishou	吉首市	Hunan	Xiangxi	1,078	1982-08-03
Leiyang	耒阳市	Hunan	Hengyang	2,648	1986-11-11
Lengshuijiang	冷水江市	Hunan	Loudi	438	1983-07-13
Lianyuan	涟源市	Hunan	Loudi	1,912	1987-06-10
Liling	醴陵市	Hunan	Zhuzhou	2,156	1985-05-24
Linxiang	临湘市	Hunan	Yueyang	1,719	1992-09-01
Liuyang	浏阳市	Hunan	Changsha	4,997	1993-01-16
Miluo	汨罗市	Hunan	Yueyang	1,670	1987-09-23
Ningxiang	宁乡市	Hunan	Changsha	2,912	2017-04-09
Qiyang	祁阳市	Hunan	Yongzhou	2,538	2021-01-20
Shaodong	邵东市	Hunan	Shaoyang	1,778	2019-07-12
Shaoshan	韶山市	Hunan	Xiangtan	247	1990-12-26
Wugang	武冈市	Hunan	Shaoyang	1,539	1994-02-18
Xiangxiang	湘乡市	Hunan	Xiangtan	1,966	1986-09-12
Yuanjiang	沅江市	Hunan	Yiyang	2,129	1988-10-11
Zixing	资兴市	Hunan	Chenzhou	2,730	1984-12-20
Arxan	阿尔山市	Inner Mongolia	Hinggan	7,409	1996-06-10
Erenhot	二连浩特市	Inner Mongolia	Xilingol	4,013	1966-01-18
Ergun	额尔古纳市	Inner Mongolia	Hulunbuir	28,958	1994-07-13
Fengzhen	丰镇市	Inner Mongolia	Ulanqab	2,704	1990-11-15
Genhe	根河市	Inner Mongolia	Hulunbuir	19,659	1994-04-28
Holingol	霍林郭勒市	Inner Mongolia	Tongliao	585	1985-11-09
Manzhouli	满洲里市	Inner Mongolia	Hulunbuir	453	1954-05-21
Ulanhot	乌兰浩特市	Inner Mongolia	Hinggan	2,728	1980-07-26
Xilinhot	锡林浩特市	Inner Mongolia	Xilingol	14,780	1983-10-10
Yakeshi	牙克石市	Inner Mongolia	Hulunbuir	27,590	1983-10-10
Zhalantun	扎兰屯市	Inner Mongolia	Hulunbuir	16,800	1983-10-10
Changshu	常熟市	Jiangsu	Suzhou	1,276	1983-01-18
Danyang	丹阳市	Jiangsu	Zhenjiang	1,047	1987-12-15
Dongtai	东台市	Jiangsu	Yancheng	3,221	1987-12-17
Gaoyou	高邮市	Jiangsu	Yangzhou	1,922	1991-02-06
Hai'an	海安市	Jiangsu	Nantong	1,108	2018-02-22
Jiangyin	江阴市	Jiangsu	Wuxi	987	1987-04-23
Jingjiang	靖江市	Jiangsu	Taizhou	656	1993-07-14
Jurong	句容市	Jiangsu	Zhenjiang	1,387	1995-04-06
Liyang	溧阳市	Jiangsu	Changzhou	1,535	1990-08-15
Kunshan	昆山市	Jiangsu	Suzhou	932	1989-07-27
Pizhou	邳州市	Jiangsu	Xuzhou	2,088	1992-07-07
Qidong	启东市	Jiangsu	Nantong	1,208	1989-11-13
Rugao	如皋市	Jiangsu	Nantong	1,492	1991-02-06
Taicang	太仓市	Jiangsu	Suzhou	823	1993-01-08
Taixing	泰兴市	Jiangsu	Taizhou	1,170	1992-09-21
Xinghua	兴化市	Jiangsu	Taizhou	2,395	1987-12-22
Xinyi	新沂市	Jiangsu	Xuzhou	1,571	1990-02-05
Yangzhong	扬中市	Jiangsu	Zhenjiang	331	1994-05-18
Yixing	宜兴市	Jiangsu	Wuxi	1,997	1988-01-09
Yizheng	仪征市	Jiangsu	Yangzhou	902	1986-04-21
Zhangjiagang	张家港市	Jiangsu	Suzhou	990	1986-09-16
Dexing	德兴市	Jiangxi	Shangrao	2,082	1990-12-26
Fengcheng	丰城市	Jiangxi	Yichun	2,845	1988-10-04
Gao'an	高安市	Jiangxi	Yichun	2,439	1993-12-08
Gongqingcheng	共青城市	Jiangxi	Jiujiang	307	2010-09-10
Guixi	贵溪市	Jiangxi	Yingtan	2,480	1996-05-28
Jinggangshan	井冈山市	Jiangxi	Ji'an	1,297	1984-12-13
Leping	乐平市	Jiangxi	Jingdezhen	1,973	1992-07-27
Longnan	龙南市	Jiangxi	Ganzhou	1,641	2020-06-12
Lushan	庐山市	Jiangxi	Jiujiang	596	2016-03-20
Ruichang	瑞昌市	Jiangxi	Jiujiang	1,423	1989-12-20
Ruijin	瑞金市	Jiangxi	Ganzhou	2,448	1994-05-18
Zhangshu	樟树市	Jiangxi	Yichun	1,219	1988-10-13
Da'an	大安市	Jilin	Baicheng	4,879	1988-08-30
Dehui	德惠市	Jilin	Changchun	3,096	1994-07-06
Dunhua	敦化市	Jilin	Yanbian	11,963	1985-02-28
Fuyu	扶余市	Jilin	Songyuan	4,189	2013-01-24
Gongzhuling	公主岭市	Jilin	Changchun	4,027	1985-12-19
Helong	和龙市	Jilin	Yanbian	5,069	1993-07-05
Huadian	桦甸市	Jilin	Jilin	6,624	1988-05-25
Hunchun	珲春市	Jilin	Yanbian	4,938	1988-05-25
Ji'an	集安市	Jilin	Tonghua	3,408	1988-03-16
Jiaohe	蛟河市	Jilin	Jilin	6,235	1989-08-15
Linjiang	临江市	Jilin	Baishan	3,009	1993-11-28
Longjing	龙井市	Jilin	Yanbian	2,193	1988-05-25
Meihekou	梅河口市	Jilin	Tonghua	2,175	1985-12-19
Panshi	磐石市	Jilin	Jilin	3,867	1995-08-30
Shuangliao	双辽市	Jilin	Siping	3,121	1996-04-29
Shulan	舒兰市	Jilin	Jilin	4,554	1992-10-08
Taonan	洮南市	Jilin	Baicheng	5,108	1987-05-21
Tumen	图们市	Jilin	Yanbian	1,142	1965-03-27
Yanji	延吉市	Jilin	Yanbian	1,731	1953-05-04
Yushu	榆树市	Jilin	Changchun	4,691	1990-12-26
Beipiao	北票市	Liaoning	Chaoyang	4,469	1985-01-17
Beizhen	北镇市	Liaoning	Jinzhou	1,693	1995-03-21
Dashiqiao	大石桥市	Liaoning	Yingkou	1,379	1992-11-03
Dengta	灯塔市	Liaoning	Liaoyang	1,313	1996-08-27
Diaobingshan	调兵山市	Liaoning	Tieling	262	1986-09-12
Donggang	东港市	Liaoning	Dandong	2,496	1993-06-18
Fengcheng	凤城市	Liaoning	Dandong	5,518	1994-03-08
Gaizhou	盖州市	Liaoning	Yingkou	2,953	1992-11-03
Haicheng	海城市	Liaoning	Anshan	2,566	1985-01-17
Kaiyuan	开原市	Liaoning	Tieling	2,813	1988-12-27
Linghai	凌海市	Liaoning	Jinzhou	2,417	1993-11-16
Lingyuan	凌源市	Liaoning	Chaoyang	3,264	1991-12-21
Wafangdian	瓦房店市	Liaoning	Dalian	3,791	1985-01-17
Xingcheng	兴城市	Liaoning	Huludao	2,103	1986-12-13
Xinmin	新民市	Liaoning	Shenyang	3,315	1993-06-14
Zhuanghe	庄河市	Liaoning	Dalian	3,900	1992-09-21
Lingwu	灵武市	Ningxia	Yinchuan	3,846	1996-04-29
Qingtongxia	青铜峡市	Ningxia	Wuzhong	2,438	1984-12-17
Delingha	德令哈市	Qinghai	Haixi	27,766	1988-04-19
Golmud	格尔木市	Qinghai	Haixi	119,167	1980-06-14
Mangnai	茫崖市	Qinghai	Haixi	49,800	2018-02-22
Tongren	同仁市	Qinghai	Huangnan	3,465	2020-06-12
Yushu	玉树市	Qinghai	Yushu	15,413	2013-07-04
Binzhou	彬州市	Shaanxi	Xianyang	1,181	2018-02-22
Hancheng	韩城市	Shaanxi	Weinan	1,596	1983-09-09
Huayin	华阴市	Shaanxi	Weinan	675	1990-12-27
Shenmu	神木市	Shaanxi	Yulin	7,481	2017-04-09
Xingping	兴平市	Shaanxi	Xianyang	509	1993-06-18
Xunyang	旬阳市	Shaanxi	Ankang	3,540	2021-01-20
Zichang	子长市	Shaanxi	Yan'an	2,393	2019-07-12
Anqiu	安丘市	Shandong	Weifang	1,712	1994-01-18
Changyi	昌邑市	Shandong	Weifang	1,628	1994-06-10
Feicheng	肥城市	Shandong	Tai'an	1,277	1992-08-01
Gaomi	高密市	Shandong	Weifang	1,527	1994-05-18
Haiyang	海阳市	Shandong	Yantai	1,909	1996-04-29
Jiaozhou	胶州市	Shandong	Qingdao	1,324	1987-02-12
Laixi	莱西市	Shandong	Qingdao	1,568	1990-12-18
Laiyang	莱阳市	Shandong	Yantai	1,732	1987-02-20
Laizhou	莱州市	Shandong	Yantai	1,928	1988-02-24
Leling	乐陵市	Shandong	Dezhou	1,173	1988-09-01
Linqing	临清市	Shandong	Liaocheng	950	1983-08-30
Longkou	龙口市	Shandong	Yantai	901	1986-09-23
Pingdu	平度市	Shandong	Qingdao	3,176	1989-07-27
Qingzhou	青州市	Shandong	Weifang	1,569	1986-03-01
Qixia	栖霞市	Shandong	Yantai	2,016	1995-11-30
Qufu	曲阜市	Shandong	Jining	815	1986-06-02
Rongcheng	荣成市	Shandong	Weihai	1,526	1988-11-01
Rushan	乳山市	Shandong	Weihai	1,665	1993-07-17
Shouguang	寿光市	Shandong	Weifang	1,990	1993-06-01
Tengzhou	滕州市	Shandong	Zaozhuang	1,495	1988-03-07
Xintai	新泰市	Shandong	Tai'an	1,934	1983-08-30
Yucheng	禹城市	Shandong	Dezhou	992	1993-09-09
Zhaoyuan	招远市	Shandong	Yantai	1,432	1991-12-21
Zhucheng	诸城市	Shandong	Weifang	2,151	1987-04-20
Zoucheng	邹城市	Shandong	Jining	1,616	1992-10-04
Zouping	邹平市	Shandong	Binzhou	1,250	2018-07-02
Fenyang	汾阳市	Shanxi	Lüliang	1,170	1996-08-20
Gaoping	高平市	Shanxi	Jincheng	980	1993-05-12
Gujiao	古交市	Shanxi	Taiyuan	1,512	1988-02-24
Hejin	河津市	Shanxi	Yuncheng	593	1994-01-12
Houma	侯马市	Shanxi	Linfen	220	1971-06-05
Huairen	怀仁市	Shanxi	Shuozhou	1,234	2018-02-22
Huozhou	霍州市	Shanxi	Linfen	765	1989-12-23
Jiexiu	介休市	Shanxi	Jinzhong	741	1992-02-10
Xiaoyi	孝义市	Shanxi	Lüliang	938	1992-02-10
Yongji	永济市	Shanxi	Yuncheng	1,208	1994-01-12
Yuanping	原平市	Shanxi	Xinzhou	2,550	1993-06-17
Barkam	马尔康市	Sichuan	Ngawa	6,633	2015-11-02
Chongzhou	崇州市	Sichuan	Chengdu	1,090	1994-06-20
Dujiangyan	都江堰市	Sichuan	Chengdu	1,208	1988-03-03
Emeishan	峨眉山市	Sichuan	Leshan	1,181	1988-09-01
Guanghan	广汉市	Sichuan	Deyang	549	1988-02-24
Huaying	华蓥市	Sichuan	Guang'an	466	1985-02-04
Huili	会理市	Sichuan	Liangshan	4,527	2021-01-20
Jiangyou	江油市	Sichuan	Mianyang	2,721	1988-02-24
Jianyang	简阳市	Sichuan	Chengdu	2,214	1994-04-05
Kangding	康定市	Sichuan	Garzê	11,486	2015-02-17
Langzhong	阆中市	Sichuan	Nanchong	1,878	1991-01-12
Longchang	隆昌市	Sichuan	Neijiang	794	2017-04-09
Mianzhu	绵竹市	Sichuan	Deyang	1,246	1996-10-15
Pengzhou	彭州市	Sichuan	Chengdu	1,420	1993-12-01
Qionglai	邛崃市	Sichuan	Chengdu	1,384	1994-06-19
Shehong	射洪市	Sichuan	Suining	1,496	2019-07-12
Shifang	什邡市	Sichuan	Deyang	820	1995-11-08
Wanyuan	万源市	Sichuan	Dazhou	4,065	1993-07-14
Xichang	西昌市	Sichuan	Liangshan	2,655	1979-07-19
Jiayi	嘉义市	Taiwan	none	60	—
Jilong	基隆市	Taiwan	none	132	—
Xinzhu	新竹市	Taiwan	none	104	—
Aksu	阿克苏市	Xinjiang	Aksu	13,647	1983-08-19
Alashankou	阿拉山口市	Xinjiang	Bortala	1,204	2012-12-17
Altay	阿勒泰市	Xinjiang	Altay	10,819	1984-11-17
Aral	阿拉尔市	Xinjiang	none	5,266	2002-09-17
Artux	阿图什市	Xinjiang	Kizilsu	15,698	1986-06-07
Baiyang	白杨市	Xinjiang	none	4,928	2023-01-20
Beitun	北屯市	Xinjiang	none	911	2011-12-27
Bole	博乐市	Xinjiang	Bortala	7,802	1985-06-24
Caohu	草湖市	Xinjiang	none		2026-04-17
Changji	昌吉市	Xinjiang	Changji	7,981	1983-07-21
Fukang	阜康市	Xinjiang	Changji	8,545	1992-11-03
Hotan	和田市	Xinjiang	Hotan	466	1983-09-09
Huyanghe	胡杨河市	Xinjiang	none	677.94	2019-11-06
Kashgar	喀什市	Xinjiang	Kashgar	791	1952-05-22
Khorgas	霍尔果斯市	Xinjiang	Ili	1,909	2014-06-26
Kokdala	可克达拉市	Xinjiang	none	979.71	2015-03-16
Korla	库尔勒市	Xinjiang	Bayingolin	6,038	1979-09-02
Kuytun	奎屯市	Xinjiang	Ili	1,171	1975-08-29
Kunyu	昆玉市	Xinjiang	none	687.13	2016-01-07
Kuqa	库车市	Xinjiang	Aksu	14,529	2019-11-20
Shawan	沙湾市	Xinjiang	Tacheng	12,460	2021-01-20
Shihezi	石河子市	Xinjiang	none	457	1976-01-02
Shuanghe	双河市	Xinjiang	none	742	2014-01-25
Tacheng	塔城市	Xinjiang	Tacheng	4,007	1984-11-17
Tiemenguan	铁门关市	Xinjiang	none	590	2012-12-17
Tumxuk	图木舒克市	Xinjiang	none	2,003	2002-09-17
Wujiaqu	五家渠市	Xinjiang	none	742	2002-09-17
Wusu	乌苏市	Xinjiang	Tacheng	14,394	1996-07-10
Xinxing	新星市	Xinjiang	none	539.76	2021-02-04
Yining	伊宁市	Xinjiang	Ili	730	1952-05-22
Anning	安宁市	Yunnan	Kunming	1,313	1995-10-13
Chengjiang	澄江市	Yunnan	Yuxi	773	2019-11-20
Chuxiong	楚雄市	Yunnan	Chuxiong	4,482	1983-09-09
Dali	大理市	Yunnan	Dali	1,468	1983-09-09
Gejiu	个旧市	Yunnan	Honghe	1,597	1958-09-16
Jinghong	景洪市	Yunnan	Xishuangbanna	7,133	1993-12-22
Kaiyuan	开远市	Yunnan	Honghe	2,009	1981-01-18
Lufeng	禄丰市	Yunnan	Chuxiong	3,536	2021-01-20
Lushui	泸水市	Yunnan	Nujiang	2,938	2016-06-16
Mang/Mangshi	芒市	Yunnan	Dehong	2,987	1996-10-28
Mainling	米林市	Tibet	Nyingchi	9,507	2023-04-03
Mengzi	蒙自市	Yunnan	Honghe	2,228	2010-09-10
Mile	弥勒市	Yunnan	Honghe	4,004	2013-01-24
Ruili	瑞丽市	Yunnan	Dehong	1,020	1992-06-26
Shangri-La	香格里拉市	Yunnan	Dêqên	11,613	2014-12-16
Shuifu	水富市	Yunnan	Zhaotong	319	2018-07-02
Tengchong	腾冲市	Yunnan	Baoshan	5,845	2015-08-01
Tsona	错那市	Tibet	Shannan	6,703	2023-04-03
Wenshan	文山市	Yunnan	Wenshan	3,064	2010-12-02
Xuanwei	宣威市	Yunnan	Qujing	6,257	1994-02-18
Cixi	慈溪市	Zhejiang	Ningbo	1,154	1988-10-13
Dongyang	东阳市	Zhejiang	Jinhua	1,739	1988-05-25
Haining	海宁市	Zhejiang	Jiaxing	681	1986-11-22
Jiande	建德市	Zhejiang	Hangzhou	2,364	1992-04-01
Jiangshan	江山市	Zhejiang	Quzhou	2,018	1987-11-27
Lanxi	兰溪市	Zhejiang	Jinhua	1,310	1985-05-15
Linhai	临海市	Zhejiang	Taizhou	2,171	1986-03-01
Longgang	龙港市	Zhejiang	Wenzhou	121.92	2019-08-16
Longquan	龙泉市	Zhejiang	Lishui	3,059	1990-12-26
Pinghu	平湖市	Zhejiang	Jiaxing	536	1991-06-15
Rui'an	瑞安市	Zhejiang	Wenzhou	1,278	1987-04-15
Shengzhou	嵊州市	Zhejiang	Shaoxing	1,790	1995-08-30
Tongxiang	桐乡市	Zhejiang	Jiaxing	723	1993-03-26
Wenling	温岭市	Zhejiang	Taizhou	836	1994-02-18
Yiwu	义乌市	Zhejiang	Jinhua	1,103	1988-05-25
Yongkang	永康市	Zhejiang	Jinhua	1,049	1992-08-24
Yueqing	乐清市	Zhejiang	Wenzhou	1,174	1993-09-18
Yuhuan	玉环市	Zhejiang	Taizhou	378	2017-04-09
Yuyao	余姚市	Zhejiang	Ningbo	1,346	1985-07-16
Zhuji	诸暨市	Zhejiang	Shaoxing	2,311	1989-09-27

== Sub-prefectural cities ==
A sub-prefectural city is a county-level city with powers approaching those of prefecture-level cities. Examples include, Xiantao (Hubei), Qianjiang (Hubei), Tianmen (Hubei) and Jiyuan (Henan).

== See also ==
- Administrative divisions of China
- Counties of the People's Republic of China
- Prefecture-level city
- List of cities in China
- County-administered city (Taiwan area )
