= Xinjiang Production and Construction Corps =

Paramilitary and economic organization in Xinjiang, China

- 新疆生产建设兵团; شىنجاڭ ئىشلەپچىقىرىش قۇرۇلۇش بىڭتۇەنى
- National Emblem of China
- Active: 1954 – present
- Country: People's Republic of China
- Allegiance: Chinese Communist Party
- Type: State-owned enterprise Paramilitary organisation
- Size: 2.6 million
- Headquarters and area served: Ürümqi & Xinjiang
- Nicknames: XJBT; Bingtuan
- Divisions: 14
- Website: www.xjbt.gov.cn

Commanders
- First Political Commissar: Chen Xiaojiang
- Political Commissar and Party Secretary: He Zhongyou
- Commander: Xue Bin

Xinjiang Production and Construction Corps

Chinese name
- Simplified Chinese: 新疆生产建设兵团
- Traditional Chinese: 新疆生產建設兵團
Transcriptions
Standard Mandarin
- Hanyu Pinyin: Xīnjiāng Shēngchǎn Jiànshè Bīngtuán

Alternative Chinese name
- Simplified Chinese: 新疆兵团
- Traditional Chinese: 新疆兵團
Transcriptions
Standard Mandarin
- Hanyu Pinyin: Xīnjiāng Bīngtuán

Second alternative Chinese name
- Simplified Chinese: 兵团
- Traditional Chinese: 兵團
- Literal meaning: The Corps
Transcriptions
Standard Mandarin
- Hanyu Pinyin: Bīngtuán

China Xinjian Group
- Simplified Chinese: 中国新建集团
- Traditional Chinese: 中國新建集團
Transcriptions
Standard Mandarin
- Hanyu Pinyin: Zhōngguó Xīnjiàn Jítuán

Uyghur name
- Uyghur: شىنجاڭ ئىشلەپچىقىرىش قۇرۇلۇش بىڭتۇەنى
Transcriptions
- Latin Yëziqi: Shinjang Ishlepchiqirish Qurulush Bingtueni

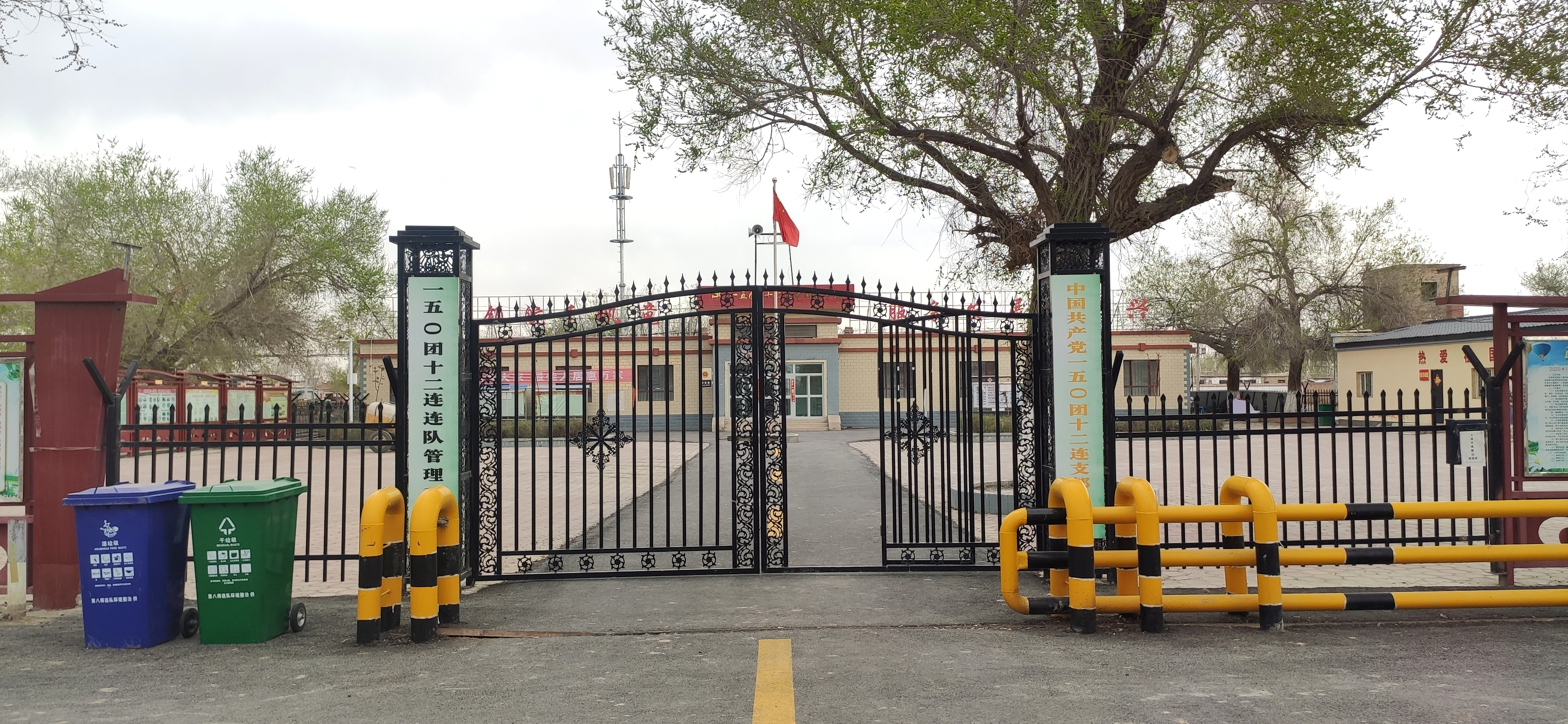
12th company, 150th regiment, 8th division, Xinjiang production and Construction Corps

The Xinjiang Production and Construction Corps (XPCC), also known as Bingtuan, trading with the external name China Xinjian Group, is a state-owned enterprise and paramilitary organization in the Xinjiang Uygur Autonomous Region of the People's Republic of China (PRC).

The XPCC was established in 1954 under the orders of Chinese leader Mao Zedong, and developed sparsely populated areas in its early decades, taking the model of the traditional tuntian system of setting military units in frontier areas. The XPCC was severely damaged during the Cultural Revolution, and was outright abolished in 1975, before being re-established in 1981, partly due to the Soviet–Afghan War. It re-established its economic dominance over Xinjiang afterwards, also being responsible for maintenance against the "three evils" (separatism, religious extremism, and terrorism). In its history, the XPCC has built farms, towns, and cities, provided land and employment to disbanded military units, and re-settled Han migrants from other parts of China in what has been called a campaign of assimilation and Sinicization of the local Uyghur population.

The XPCC is under both the Central People's Government and the Xinjiang Uygur Autonomous Regional People's Government, headed by the Chinese Communist Party committee secretary of Xinjiang. XPCC's own CCP committee secretary typically concurrently serves as its political commissar and acts as its highest day-to-day authority, and is considered to be the second most-powerful person in Xinjiang after the Party Secretary. The XPCC operates cities, where it provides prisons, healthcare, policing, judiciary, and education, and has stakes in numerous publicly traded companies. It is extensively involved in economic, political and military affairs of Xinjiang, being called a "state in a state".

== History ==
The XPCC draws from the traditional Chinese tuntian system, a policy of settling military units in frontier areas so that they become self-sufficient in food, and similar policies in the Tang and Qing dynasties. Construction corps were set up for sparsely populated frontier regions, including Heilongjiang, Inner Mongolia, and Xinjiang.

After the Chinese Communist Party took control of Xinjiang in 1949, People's Liberation Army (PLA) forces deployed into Xinjiang were commanded to start production in the area. In 1953, PLA there were separated into National Defense and Production Divisions. XPCC was formed from soldiers from First Field Army, Kuomintang, and from the local Ili National Army.

In October 1954 the Production Division was ordered by the Mao Zedong to form People's Liberation Army Xinjiang Production and Construction Corps in 1954. XPCC was founded by Wang Zhen. It initially comprised 175,000 military personnel, led by Tao Zhiyue as its first commander.

XPCC was initially focused on settling, cultivating, and developing sparsely populated areas, such as the fringes of the Taklamakan Desert and the Gurbantünggüt Desert, under the principle of "not competing for benefits with the local people". It provided a reserve military force, although they were not called upon. XPCC was expanded by youth from other parts of China, to equalize its sex ratio and include members with better education. In 1962, after the Sino-Soviet split, rioting occurred in Yining and 60,000 ethnic minorities living near the border fled to the Soviet Union. The Chinese government feared that the USSR was trying to destabilize China and start a war. XPCC was ordered to cultivate the farms of the exiles.

The XPCC was severely damaged by the Cultural Revolution. In 1975, it was abolished completely. Its powers were transferred to the government of Xinjiang and regional authorities. After the Soviet Union invaded Afghanistan in 1979, and the Islamic movements gained force, fears of Soviet encirclement and Islamic fundamentalism led to the re-establishment of the XPCC in 1981 as well as the cultivation of frontier lands and economic development. It became subject to separate planning by the state directly in 1990. During the 1990s, XPCC began to contribute significantly to Xinjiang's economy, producing 40% of the region's cotton in 1997. After 2008, as a result of improvements in farm mechanization, students were no longer compelled to pick the cotton crop.

At the end of the 20th century, XPCC's military role was given instead to the Xinjiang Military District, a part of the current Western Theater Command that includes all of western China. XPCC military personnel are mostly reservists or militia.

=== Sanctions ===
==== United States ====
XPCC was sanctioned by the United States in 2020, citing alleged human rights abuses. United States Commission on International Religious Freedom Commissioner Nury Turkel remarked, "Now, no business can claim ignorance of China's oppression of the Uyghur people. We hope the sanctions signal to other Chinese officials that there are costs associated with taking part in the Communist Party's repression of religion. The world is watching and we know which officials and entities are responsible for the abuses against the Uyghur people." Turkel added:

The XPCC is essentially a parallel government in Xinjiang and has been directly involved in implementing the surveillance, mass detention, and forced labor of Uyghurs.

In July 2020, the United States announced Global Magnitsky Act sanctions on XPCC in connection with human rights abuses against Uyghurs and other ethnic minorities. XPCC was alleged to run many re-education camps, as well as implementing the CCP's efforts to settle ethnic Han in the region.

In December 2020, the U.S. Customs and Border Protection announced that XPCC-produced cotton and cotton products would be prohibited from import into the U.S. due to forced labor concerns. In June 2021, the United States Department of Commerce placed XPCC on the Bureau of Industry and Security's Entity List.

==== Canada ====
Following the U.S. footsteps, Global Affairs Canada imposed sanctions against the XPCC in January 2021 due to human rights abuses.

==== European Union ====
In March 2021, the Council of the European Union listed the XPCC public security bureau as an entity subject to restrictive measures. The reason given for this listing was that this entity is "responsible for serious human rights violations, in particular large-scale arbitrary detentions and degrading treatment inflicted upon Uyghurs and people from other Muslim ethnic minorities".

== Organization and function ==
The XPCC is a ministerial-level institution under the Central People's Government and the Xinjiang Uygur Autonomous Regional People's Government. It operates under a management system that combines the functions of the Chinese Communist Party, government, military, and enterprises and has the authority to manage its own internal administrative and judicial affairs within its jurisdiction. It has administrative authority over medium-sized cities, settlements and farms in Xinjiang. It provides services such as healthcare, policing, judiciary, and education. Nominally subject to the Xinjiang Uygur Autonomous Region, its internal affairs, including city and reclaimed land administration, are separate from that of the Autonomous Region and under direct control of the central government. The XPCC has been described to operate as a "state within a state" and has been considered by scholars as acting as a de facto prefecture-level governmental entity. It is commonly considered an entity parallel to the provincial-level local governments in official Chinese sources.

The XPCC's internal affairs, including the administration of its cities and reclaimed land, is separate from that of the Autonomous Region and under direct control of the central government. It has sub-provincial powers on par with sub-provincial cities as an entity subject to separate economic planning. The XPCC is headed by the Party Secretary of Xinjiang, who is "executive political commissar" ex officio. The XPCC's own party secretary, usually a ministerial-level official, typically concurrently serves as its political commissar and acts as its highest day-to-day authority, and is considered to be the second most-powerful person in Xinjiang after the CCP secretary. Additionally XPCC has a commander, usually a deputy-ministerial level official.

Headquartered in Ürümqi, XPCC is subdivided into divisions, then regiments. Each XPCC division corresponds to a prefecture-level administrative division, and are in themselves of sub-prefectural rank. In addition to regiments, the XPCC also administers regiment-level farms and ranches (团场). Frontier regiment farms (边疆农场) served a secondary function of preventing defection and were created along the border after the Yi–Ta incident in 1962. XPCC and each individual division are headed by three leaders: a first political commissar, a political commissar, and a commander. The first political commissars of each XPCC division are their committee secretaries.

=== Administrative structure ===
The XPCC's 14 divisions which are then subdivided into 185 regiment-level entities (including regiments, farms, and ranches).

The divisions are:

Name	Founded	Location (approximate)	Headquarters
1st Division	1953	Aksu Prefecture	Aral
2nd Division	1953	Bayingolin Autonomous Prefecture	Tiemenguan
3rd Division	1966	Kashgar Prefecture	Tumxuk
4th Division	1953	Ili Kazakh Autonomous Prefecture (southern, directly administered portion)	Kokdala
5th Division	1953	Bortala Autonomous Prefecture	Shuanghe
6th Division	1953	Changji Autonomous Prefecture	Wujiaqu
7th Division	1953	Ili Autonomous Prefecture and Karamay	Huyanghe
8th Division	1953	area east of Karamay	Shihezi
9th Division	1962	Tacheng Prefecture	Emin County
10th Division	1959	Altay Prefecture	Beitun
11th Division the former Construction Division	1953	Ürümqi	Xinshi, Ürümqi
12th Division	1982	Ürümqi	Ürümqi
13th Division	1982	Hami	Hami
14th Division	1982	Hotan Prefecture	Kunyu

In May 1953, the PLA's 25th, 26th and 27th Divisions from the 9th Corps were reorganized as 7th, 8th and 9th Agriculture Construction Division of the XPCC, respectively.

=== Settlements ===
The XPCC has settled Han in Xinjiang and has built eleven medium-sized cities during its history, and now controls ten of them. The governments of these cities are combined entirely with the division that controls them. For example, the division headquarters is the same entity as the city government, the division political commissar the same person as the city committee secretary, the division commander the same person as the city's mayor, and so forth. Ten XPCC-administered cities are nominally listed as "sub-prefectural-level cities" of Xinjiang, but the local government is usually not involved in the administration of these cities.

Name			Dates of official designation as a "city"	Governing period	Division
Kuytun		奎屯市	29 August 1975	1953–1975	7th
↳	Tianbei New Area	天北新区	–	2002–2019	7th
Shihezi		石河子市	2 January 1976	1953–1975, 1980–present	8th
Aral		阿拉尔市	19 January 2004	1953–1975, 1980–present	1st
Wujiaqu		五家渠市	19 January 2004	1953–1975, 1980–present	6th
Tumxuk		图木舒克市	19 January 2004	1966–1975, 1980–present	3rd
Beitun		北屯市	28 November 2011	2002–present	10th
Tiemenguan		铁门关市	30 December 2012	2002–present	2nd
Shuanghe		双河市	26 February 2014	2002–present	5th
Kokdala		可克达拉市	18 March 2015	2003–present	4th
Kunyu		昆玉市	20 January 2016	2003–present	14th
Huyanghe		胡杨河市	6 December 2019	2010–present	7th
Xinxing		新星市	4 February 2021	2010–present	13th
Baiyang		白杨市	20 January 2023	2010–present	9th
Caohu		草湖市	17 April 2026	2014–present	41st Regiment Farm of 3rd Division
Beiting		北亭市	TBD	2010–present	12th

=== Demographics ===
The XPCC is predominantly composed of Chinese citizens of Han ethnicity. While the Han are by far the largest group of XPCC workers, their relative numbers have declined: from 1980 to 1993 the overall population remained constant, while Han membership declined slightly from 90% to 88%.

Ethnic groups in XPCC, 2002 estimate
Nationality	Population	Percentage
Han	2,204,500	88.1
Uyghur	165,000	6.6
Hui	64,700	2.6
Kazakh	42,700	1.7
Mongol	6,200	0.3
Others	18,100	0.7

=== Economic activity ===
XPCC created many publicly traded subsidiary companies. XPCC uses the name "China Xinjian Group" for its economic activities. XPCC plays an outsized role in Xinjiang's economy; in 2022, the organization produced CN¥350 billion (US$52 billion), or around 19.7% of Xinjiang's economy, while the per capita GDP was CN¥98,748 (US$14,680). The area and population of the XPCC are generally given as part of Xinjiang's total figures, but XPCC's GDP is generally reported separately.

XPCC's primary economic activity remains agriculture, including cotton, fruit, vegetables, food crops, vegetable oils, and sugar beets. Important products are cotton, tomatoes, ketchup, Korla pears, Turpan grapes, and wine. In 2018 the XPCC produced 30% of China's cotton output. XPCC has a mix of factory farming and smaller farms. XPCC dominates Xinjiang's agriculture and controls nearly a quarter of Xinjiang's arable land. During its history, XPCC established significant mining and mining-related industries, most of which subsequently were handed over to the Xinjiang government. XPCC is also involved in tertiary industries, including trade, distribution, real estate, tourism, construction and insurance.

==== Subsidiaries ====
The XPCC has thousands of subsidiary companies. The Center for Advanced Defense Studies has identified 2,923 subsidiaries. The XPCC has eleven publicly traded subsidiaries:

- Xinjiang Baihuacun Co., Ltd. (新疆百花村股份有限公司) (百花村, 600721.SS) – primarily information technology
- Xinjiang Tianye Co., Ltd. (新疆天业股份有限公司) (新疆天业, 600075.SS) – primarily plastics
- Suntime International Economic-Trading Co., Ltd. (新天国际经贸股份有限公司) (新天国际, 600084.SS) – primarily international trade
- Xinjiang Talimu Agriculture Development Co., Ltd. (新疆塔里木农业综合开发股份有限公司) (新农开发, 600359.SS) – primarily cotton
- Xinjiang Yilite Industry Co., Ltd. (新疆伊力特实业股份有限公司) (伊力特, 600197.SS) – primarily alcohol
- Xinjiang Chalkis Co., Ltd (新疆中基实业股份有限公司) (新中基, 000972.SZ) – primarily tomatoes and related industries
- Xinjiang Tianhong Papermaking Co., Ltd. (新疆天宏纸业股份有限公司) (新疆天宏, 600419.SS) – paper manufacturing
- Xinjiang Tianfu Energy Co., Ltd. (新疆天富能源股份有限公司) (天富能源, 600509.SS) – electricity
- Xinjiang Guannong Fruit & Antler Co., Ltd. (新疆冠农果茸股份有限公司) (冠农股份, 600251.SS) – fruits; animal husbandry
- Xinjiang Qingsong Cement Co., Ltd. (新疆青松建材化工股份有限公司) (青松建化, 600425.SS) – cement
- Xinjiang Sayram Modern Agriculture Co., Ltd. (新疆赛里木现代农业股份有限公司) (新赛股份, 600540.SS) – primarily cotton

=== Education and media ===
XPCC operates its own educational system covering primary, secondary and tertiary education (including two universities, Shihezi University and Tarim University); its own daily newspaper, Bingtuan Daily; and its own TV stations at both provincial and division levels.

== See also ==
- Central Symposium on Work in Xinjiang
