= Beitun, Xinjiang =

Beitun 北屯市 (Chinese) ئېرتىش شەھىرى (Uyghur) ئېرتىش قالاسى (Kazakh)
- County-level city
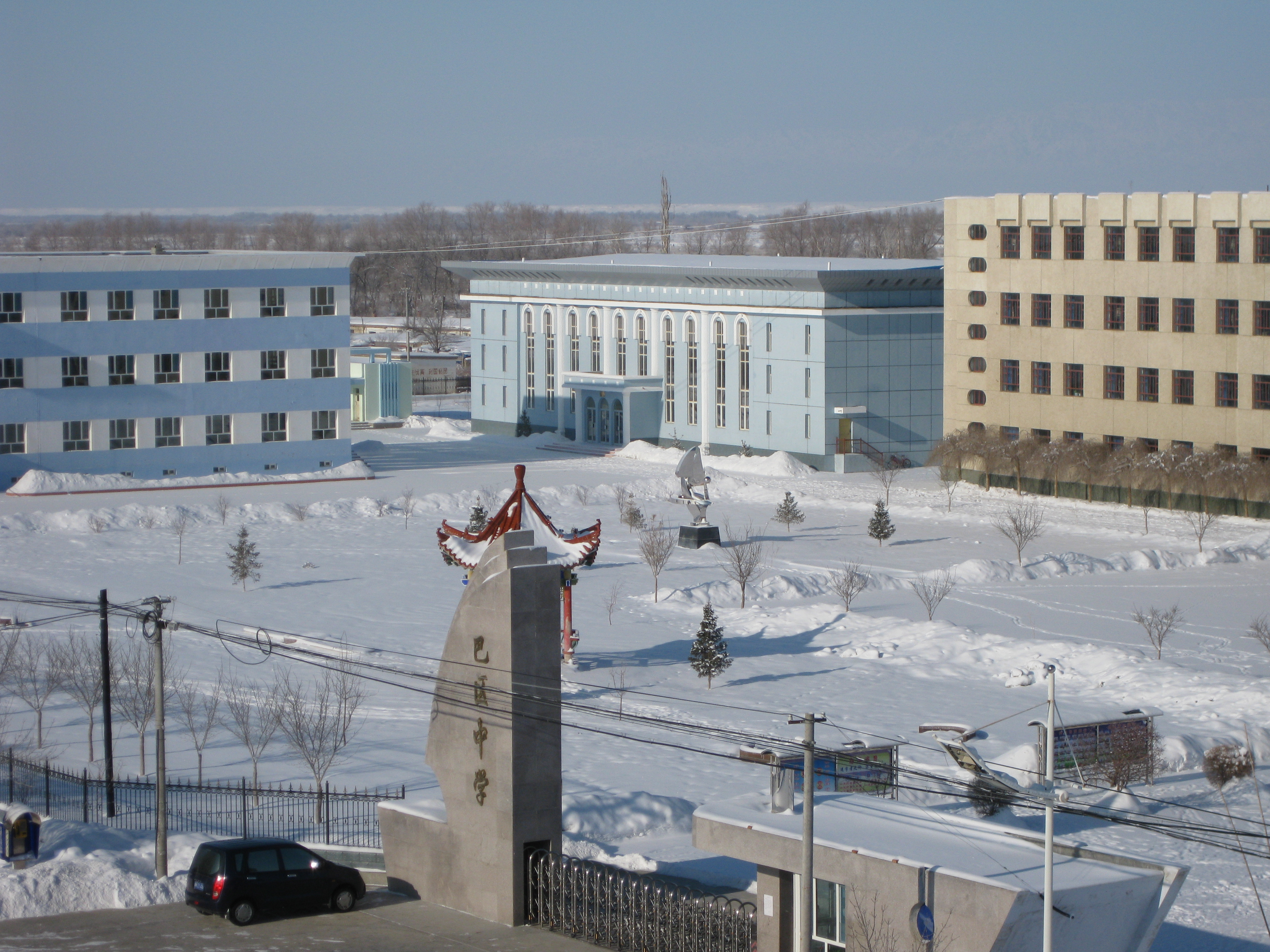
- Interactive map of Beitun
- Location in Xinjiang Beitun (Xinjiang) Beitun (China)
- Coordinates: 47°21′30″N 87°49′05″E
- Country: China
- Autonomous region: Xinjiang
- Established: 28 December 2011
- Municipal seat: Beitun Town, Altay City (Note: The government seat of Beitun City is located at Beitun Town, Altay City.)

Government
  - CCP Secretary: Wang Shengping (Political Commissar of the 10th Division)
  - Mayor: Wu Chunyun (Commander of the 10th Division)

Area
  - Total: 910.5 km^{2} (351.5 sq mi)

Population (2020)
  - Total: 20,414
  - Density: 22.42/km^{2} (58.07/sq mi)
- Time zone: UTC+8 (China Standard (Note: Locals in Xinjiang frequently observe UTC+6 (Xinjiang Time), 2 hours behind Beijing.))
- Website: www.bts.gov.cn

Beitun, Xinjiang

Chinese name
- Chinese: 北屯
Transcriptions
Standard Mandarin
- Hanyu Pinyin: Běitún

Uyghur name
- Uyghur: ئېرتىش شەھرى
Transcriptions
- Latin Yëziqi: Beatün
- Yengi Yeziⱪ: Bəatün
- SASM/GNC: Baatün
- Siril Yëziqi: Бәатүн

Beitun (Chinese: 北屯) is a city in the north of Xinjiang, China. Administratively, it is a county-level city under the direct administration of the regional government, though it is geographically located in Altay Prefecture.

Beitun is the headquarter of the 10th Division of Xinjiang Production and Construction Corps and currently administered by the 10th Division. Aral implemented the "division and city integration" (师市合一, shī shì héyī) management system, it shares the same leader group with the 10th Division.

== Overview ==
Beitun was established on 28 December 2011, making it the youngest city in China at the time, later replaced by Sansha, which was established in 2012. It was established from portions of Altay City.

Beitun covers an area of 910.5 square kilometres (351.5 sq mi), has a population of 76,300, and is located on the Irtysh River. Its name comes from the accolade "China's northernmost cultivation land" (Chinese: 中国最北的屯垦重地; pinyin: Zhōngguó zuìběi de túnkěn zhòngdì).

== Administrative divisions ==
Beitun contains 3 subdistricts and 3 towns:

| Name | Simplified Chinese | Hanyu Pinyin | Uyghur (UEY) | Uyghur Latin (ULY) | Administrative division code |
|---|---|---|---|---|---|
Subdistricts
| Tianjiao Subdistrict | 天骄街道 | Tiānjiāo Jiēdào | | | 659005001 |
| Longjiang Subdistrict | 龙疆街道 | Lóngjiāng Jiēdào | | | 659005002 |
| Junken Subdistrict | 军垦街道 | Jūnkěn Jiēdào | | | 659005003 |
Towns
| Shuangqu Town (183rd Regiment Farm)* | 双渠镇 (一八三团) | Shuāngqú Zhèn | | | 659005100 |
| Fengqing Town (187th Regiment Farm)* | 丰庆镇 (一八七团) | Fēngqìng Zhèn | | | 659005101 |
| Haichuan Town (188th Regiment Farm)* | 海川镇 (一八八团) | Hǎichuān Zhèn | | | 659005102 |
* One institution with two names. See also Tuntian#People's Republic of China.

== Transportation ==
As a terminus of the Kuytun–Beitun Railway, Beitun is an important transportation hub between Mongolia, northern Xinjiang, and Kazakhstan. Beitun Station, located a few kilometers southwest of the city center (47°19′20″N 87°45′30″E), has direct passenger railway service from Urumqi.

An extension of this railway toward Altay City is under construction; it was expected to open in 2016.
