= Tumxuk =

Tumxuk: تۇمشۇق شەھىرى (Uyghur); 图木舒克市 (Chinese)
- County-level city
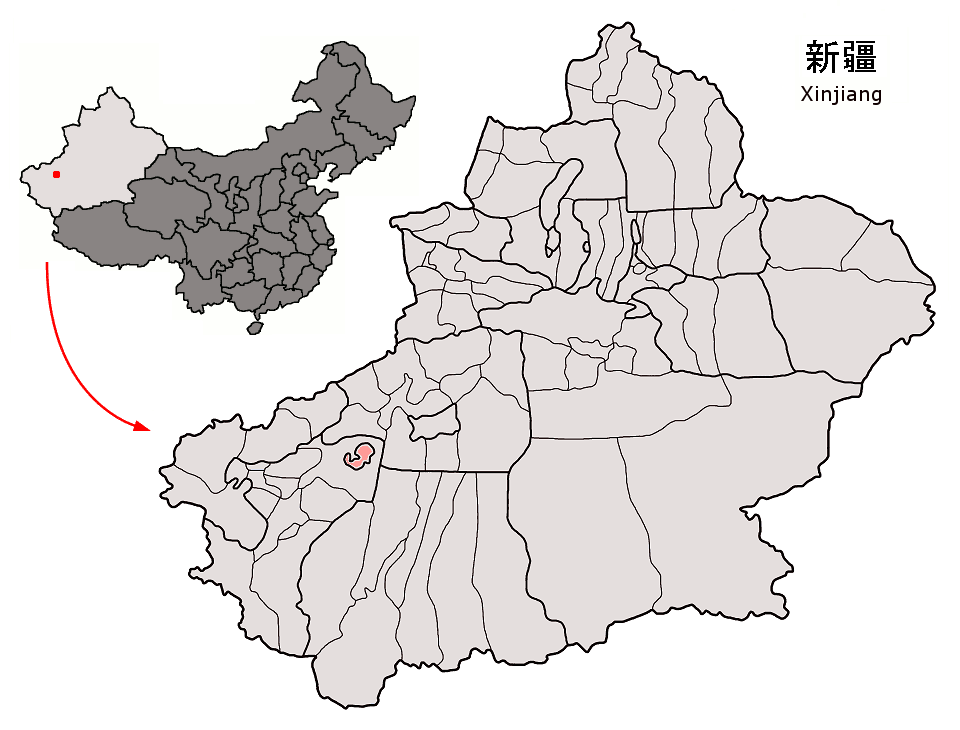
- Location of Tumxuk City (red) jurisdiction in Xinjiang

- Location of the city centre in Xinjiang Tumxuk (Xinjiang) Tumxuk (China)
- Coordinates: 39°52′N 79°4′E
- Country: China
- Autonomous region: Xinjiang
- Municipal seat: Jinxiu Subdistrict

Government
  - CCP Secretary: vacant (Political Commissar of the 3rd Division)
  - Mayor: Xi Yan (Commander of the 3rd Division)

Area
  - Total: 1,927 km^{2} (744 sq mi)

Population (2020)
  - Total: 263,245
  - Density: 136.6/km^{2} (353.8/sq mi)
- Time zone: UTC+8 (China Standard (Note: Locals in Xinjiang frequently observe UTC+6 (Xinjiang Time), 2 hours behind Beijing.))
- Website: www.xjbtnss.gov.cn

Tumxuk

Chinese name
- Simplified Chinese: 图木舒克
- Traditional Chinese: 圖木舒克
Transcriptions
Standard Mandarin
- Hanyu Pinyin: Túmùshūkè

Uyghur name
- Uyghur: تۇمشۇق
Transcriptions
- Latin Yëziqi: Tumshuq
- Yengi Yeziⱪ: Tumxuⱪ
- SASM/GNC: Tumxuk
- Siril Yëziqi: Тумшуқ

Tumxuk (Note: Chinese: 图木舒克; pinyin: Túmùshūkè; Uyghur: تۇمشۇق, ULY: Tumshuq, UYY: Tumxuⱪ) is a county-level city in the western part of Xinjiang, China. The eastern part of Tumxuk is surrounded by Maralbexi County, Kashgar Prefecture. The smaller western part is near Kashgar.

Tumxuk is the headquarter of the 3rd Division of Xinjiang Production and Construction Corps and currently administered by the 3rd Division. The city implemented the "division and city integration" (师市合一, shī shì héyī) management system, it shares the same leader group with the 3rd Division.

== History ==
In 1997, Tumxuk City was established.

== Geography ==
It covers an area of 1,927 square kilometres (744 sq mi) and is located 1,222 kilometres (759 mi) southwest of Ürümqi.

== Demographics ==
As of 2015, 101,042 (62.0%) of the 163,101 residents of the city were Uyghur, 60,914 (37.3%) were Han Chinese and 1,145 were from other ethnic groups.

== Transportation ==
The city is served by Tumushuke Tangwangcheng Airport and a branch from the Southern Xinjiang railway.

== Administrative divisions ==
Tumxuk contains 3 subdistricts and 14 towns:

Name	Simplified Chinese	Hanyu Pinyin	Uyghur (UEY)	Uyghur Latin (ULY)	Administrative division code
Subdistricts
Jinxiu Subdistrict	锦绣街道	Jǐnxiù Jiēdào	جىنشيۇ كوچا باشقارمىسى	Jinshyu kocha bashqarmisi	659003001
Qianhai Subdistrict	前海街道	Qiánhǎi Jiēdào	چيەنخاي كوچا باشقارمىسى	Chyenxay kocha bashqarmisi	659003002
Yong'anba Subdistrict	永安坝街道	Yǒng'ānbà Jiēdào	يۇڭئەنبا كوچا باشقارمىسى	yung'enba kocha bashqarmisi	659003003
Towns
Longkou Town (42nd Regiment Farm)*	龙口镇 (四十二团)	Lóngkǒu Zhèn			659003101
Qianhai Town (45th Regiment Farm)*	前海镇 (四十五团)	Qiánhǎi Zhèn			659003102
Yongxing Town (46th Regiment Farm)*	永兴镇 (四十六团)	Yǒngxīng Zhèn	يۇڭشىڭ بازىرى	Yungshing baziri	659003103
Xing'an Town (54th Regiment Farm)*	兴安镇 (五十四团)	Xīng'ān Zhèn	شىڭئەن بازىرى	shing'en baziri	659003104
Jiahe Town (Payzawat Headquarters Farm of the 3rd Division)*	嘉和镇 (第三师伽师总场)	Jiāhé Zhèn			659003105
Hedong Town (48th Regiment Farm)*	河东镇 (四十八团)	Hédōng Zhèn			659003106
Xiahe Town (50th Regiment Farm)*	夏河镇 (五十团)	Xiàhé Zhèn			659003107
Yong'an Town (44th Regiment Farm)*	永安镇 (四十四团)	Yǒng'ān Zhèn			659003108
Hai'an Town (49th Regiment Farm)*	海安镇 (四十九团)	Hǎi'ān Zhèn			659003109
Tangyi Town (51st Regiment Farm)*	唐驿镇 (五十一团)	Tángyì Zhèn			659003110
Jinhuyang Town (53rd Regiment Farm)*	金胡杨镇 (五十三团)	Jīnhúyáng Zhèn			659003111
Dongfeng Town (Dongfeng Farm of the 3rd Division)*	东风镇 (第三师东风农场)	Dōngfēng Zhèn			659003112
Xinghua Town (Kargilik No. 2 Farm of the 3rd Division)*	杏花镇 (第三师叶城二牧场)	Xìnghuā Zhèn			659003113
* One institution with two names. See also Tuntian#People's Republic of China.

== Works of art ==
Tumxuk (usually spelled Tumshuq) is a well known archaeological site for Serindian art.

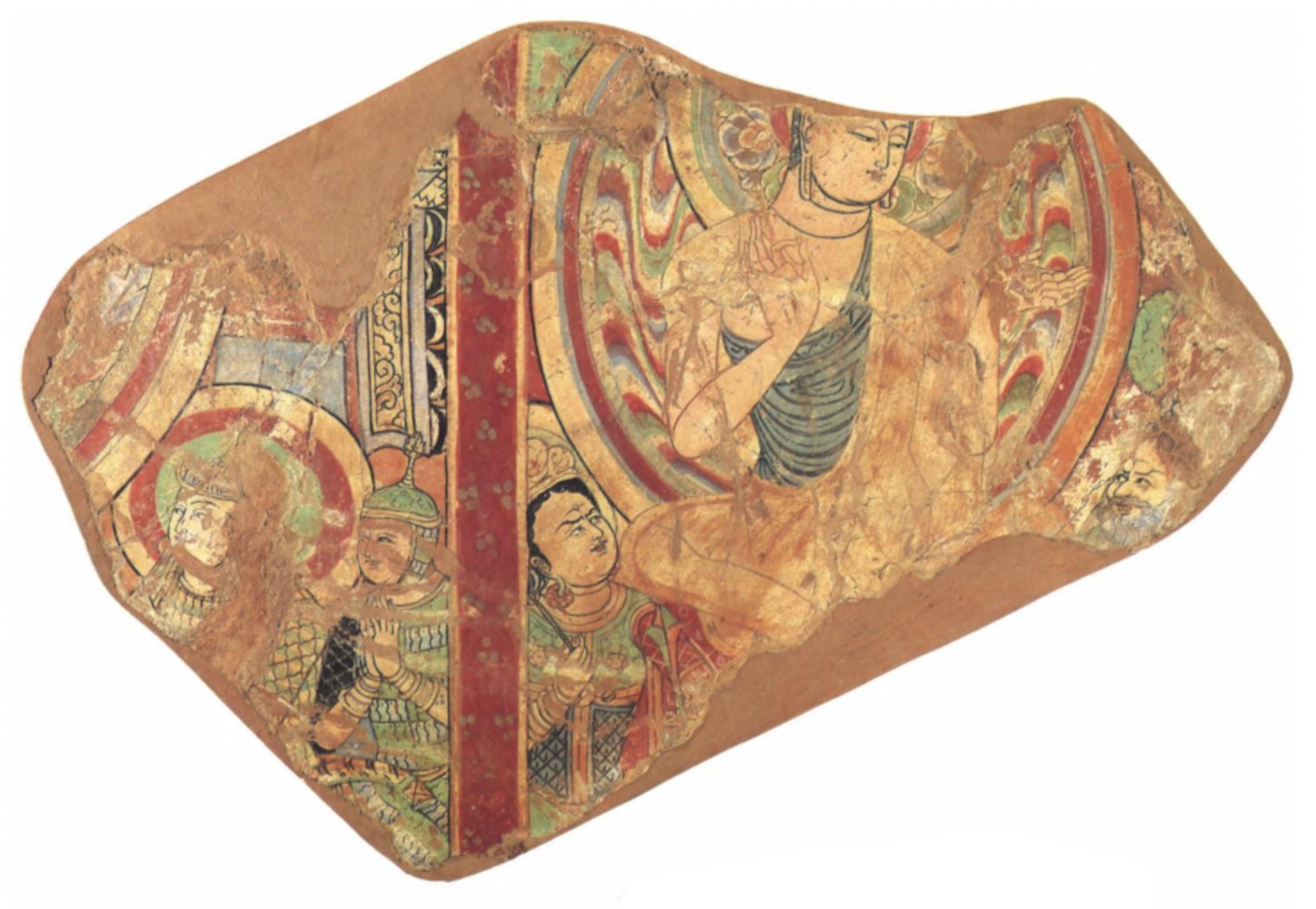
Tumshuk. Scenes of the Buddha preaching. 7th century CE

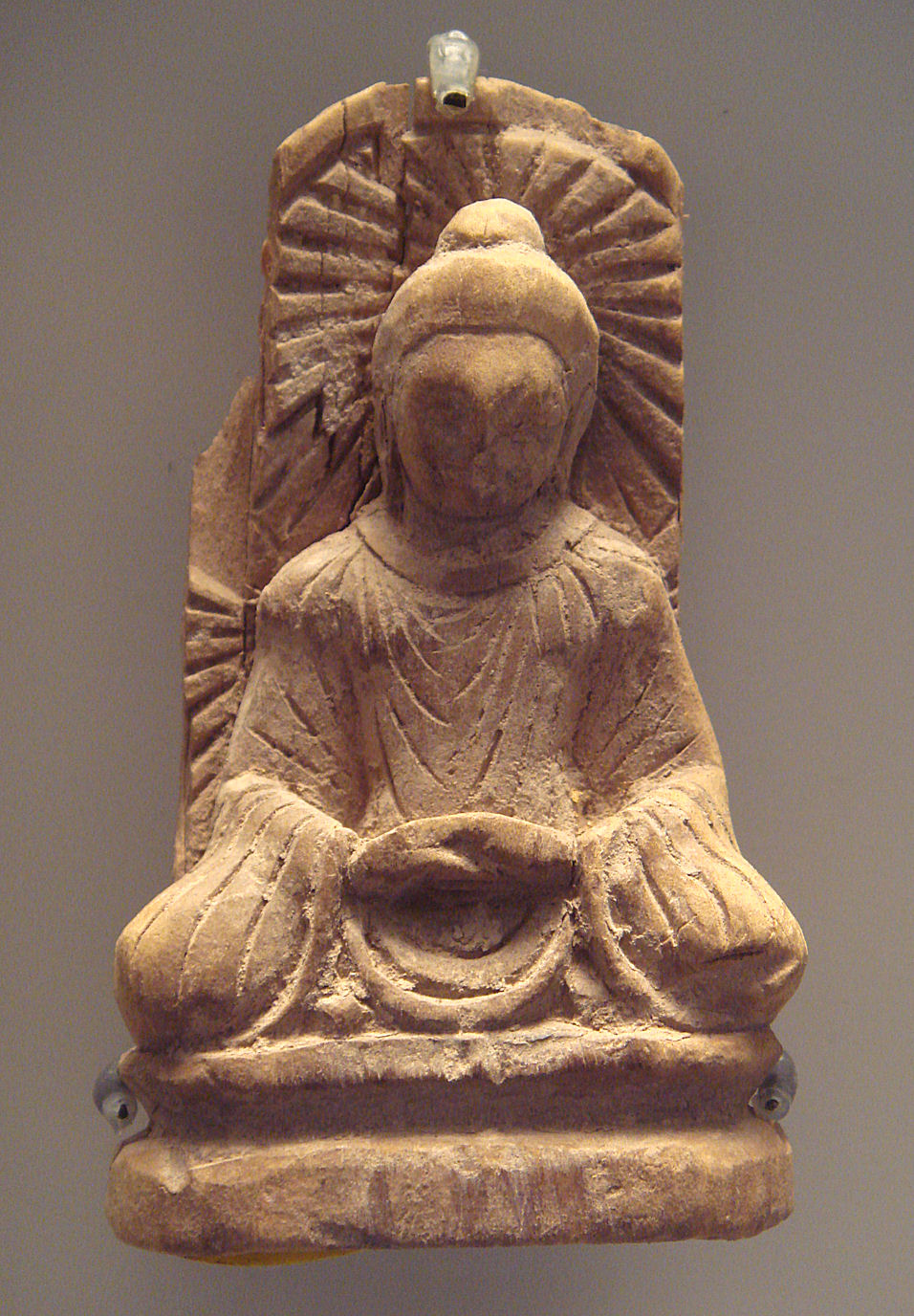
A Serindian art Buddha statue from Tumshuq, Xinjiang. 5th century.

== See also ==
- Xinjiang Production and Construction Corps
