= Xinjiang Time =

Time standard used in Xinjiang, China

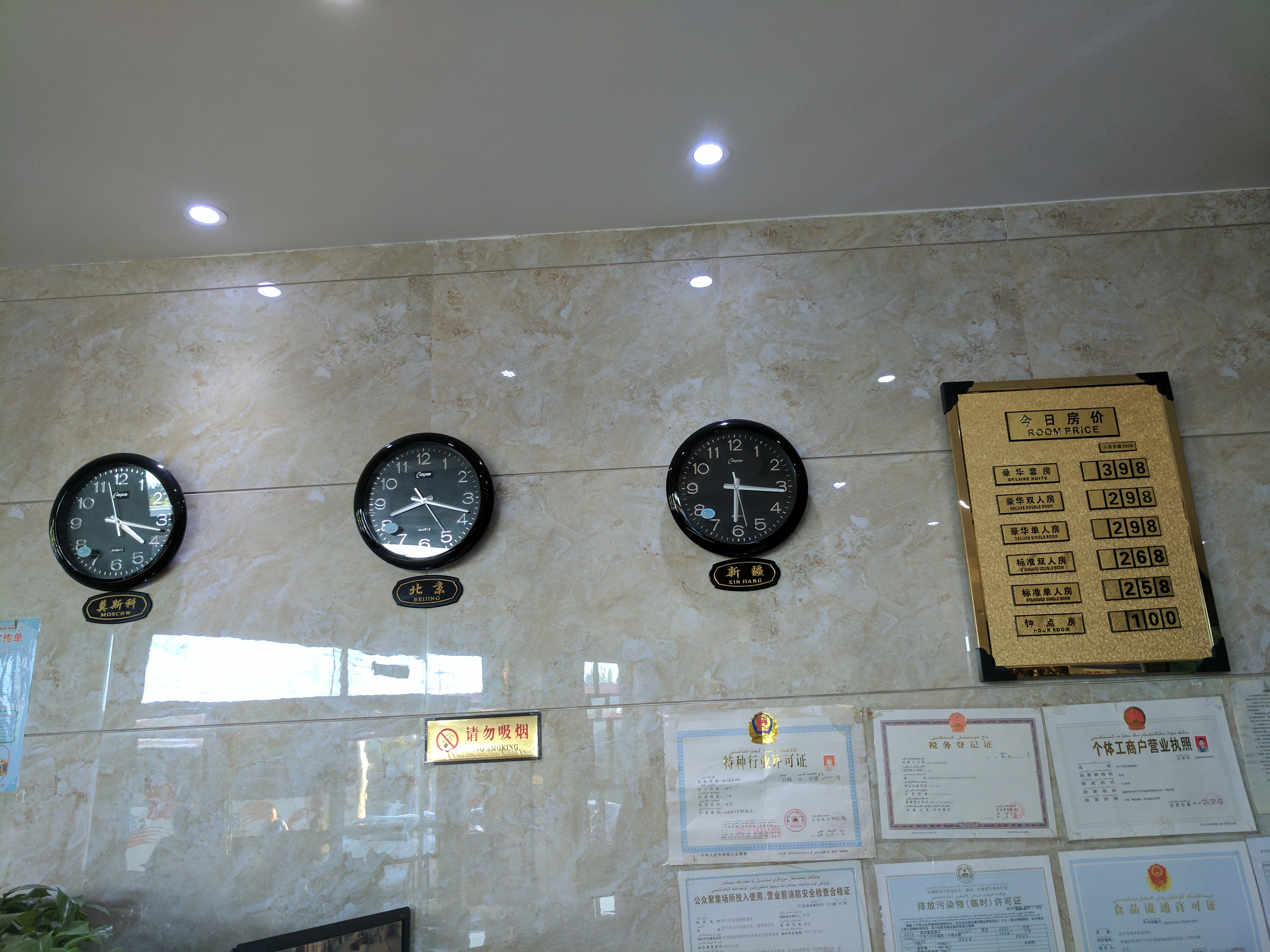
Hotel clocks in Ili, Xinjiang, showing the local time in Moscow, Beijing, and Xinjiang

Xinjiang Time (Chinese: 新疆时间; pinyin: Xīnjiāng shíjiān), also known as Ürümqi Time (Chinese: 乌鲁木齐时间; pinyin: Wūlǔmùqí Shíjiān), is a time standard used in Xinjiang, China. It is used alongside Beijing Time, which is widely observed by the rest of the country. The time offset is UTC+06:00, which is two hours behind Beijing Time and is the same offset used by Kyrgyzstan. This offset accounts for Xinjiang's geographical location in the westernmost part of China.

== History ==
Xinjiang Time has been abolished and re-established multiple times, particularly during the 1970s and 1980s. In February 1986, the Chinese government approved the use of Xinjiang Time (UTC+06:00) in Xinjiang Uyghur Autonomous Region (excluding the area owned by Xinjiang Production and Construction Corps) for civil purposes, while military, railroad, aviation, and telecommunication sectors were supposed to continue using Beijing Time (UTC+08:00). However, the decision was rejected by the local ethnic Han population and some Han-dominated regional governments.

== Usage ==
The location of Xinjiang in China

The choice of time zone used in Xinjiang is roughly split along the ethnic divide, with most of the Han population observing Beijing Time, and most of the Uyghur population and some other ethnic groups following Xinjiang Time. Accordingly, the Xinjiang Television network schedules its Chinese channel according to Beijing Time and its Uyghur and Kazakh channels according to Xinjiang Time. In some areas, local authorities use both time standards side by side.

The coexistence of two time zones within the same region causes some confusion among the local population, especially when members of multiple ethnic groups want to communicate with each other: whenever a time is mentioned, it is necessary to explicitly state whether the time is Xinjiang Time or Beijing Time, or to convert the time according to the ethnicity of the target audience. Additionally, some ethnic Han in Xinjiang might not be aware of the existence of Xinjiang Time because of the language barrier.

Xinjiang residents who use Beijing Time typically schedule their activities two hours after the usual time that those activities would be performed in Eastern China in order to match the sunrise and sunset times. For example, if everyone in Beijing wakes up when the sun rises at 8:00 AM Beijing Time, then Xinjiang residents would plan to wake up at 10:00 AM Beijing Time, because this is when the sunrise would occur in Xinjiang. This is known in Xinjiang as the Xinjiang work/rest time.

In 2014, Apple Inc. released an update to its iOS mobile operating system that silently changed the default time for users in Xinjiang to Xinjiang Time. This change caused alarms that had been set using Beijing Time to ring two hours later than expected, resulting in a disruption of daily activities on the day after the change was released.

In 2018, according to Human Rights Watch, a Uyghur man was arrested and sent to a detention center because he set his watch to Xinjiang Time.

== IANA time zone database ==
The territory using Xinjiang Time is covered in the IANA time zone database by the following zones.

Columns marked with * are from the zone.tab file of the database.

c.c.*	coordinates*	TZ*	comments*	Standard time	Summer time	Notes
CN	+4348+08735	Asia/Urumqi	Xinjiang Time	+06:00	—N/a	
CN		Asia/Kashgar		+06:00	—N/a	Linked to Asia/Urumqi

== See also ==
- Time in China
- Historical time zones of China
