= Tuntian =

Chinese frontier farms founded by soldiers

Chinese name
- Chinese: 屯田
- Literal meaning: "garrisoning (on) farms"
Transcriptions
Standard Mandarin
- Hanyu Pinyin: túntián

Alternative Chinese name
- Chinese: 屯墾
- Literal meaning: "garrisoning and reclaiming wasteland"
Transcriptions
Standard Mandarin
- Hanyu Pinyin: túnkěn

Second alternative Chinese name
- Chinese: 农墾
- Literal meaning: "farming and reclaiming wasteland"
Transcriptions
Standard Mandarin
- Hanyu Pinyin: nóngkĕn

Vietnamese name
- Vietnamese: đồn điền

Korean name
- Hangul: 둔전
Transcriptions
- Revised Romanization: dunjeon
- McCune–Reischauer: tunjŏn

Japanese name
- Hiragana: とんでん
Transcriptions
- Romanization: tonden

Tuntian (屯田) or tunken (屯墾) was a form of frontier "military-agricultural colony" or settler colony in the history of China. Troops were sent to take over strategic under- or uncultivated land and convert it into a self-sustained, agrarian colony. In other words, the soldiers doubled as farmers. The system was adopted by other regimes throughout the Chinese cultural sphere.

== Han dynasty ==
The tuntian (literally "garrisoning (on) farms") system evolved during the victorious campaign of 61–60 BC by Zhao Chongguo against the Qiang people.

While the tuntian system was made famous by Cao Cao's administration (c. 196–220 AD), Cao Cao's writings show that the system had been instituted as early as the Western Han dynasty during the reign of Emperor Wu (r. 141–87 BC), where soldiers on distant expeditions were set to work converting and farming the conquered land, both to provide food for the army and to convert the conquered land into agricultural land. After the death of Emperor Wu, however, the system was only used sporadically and therefore less effectively.

The final years of the Eastern Han dynasty (c. 189–220 AD) witnessed great economic disruption and widespread devastation, particularly through the Yellow Turban Rebellion of 184 AD; agricultural production in particular was severely disrupted, and population movements from war-ravaged areas led to massive flows of refugees. It was under these circumstances that Cao Cao's use of the tuntian system made its impact on the economic revival of China after the damage suffered previously.

=== Method ===
The mechanism of the 'civilian tuntian' system as implemented by Cao Cao had its basis in government organisation, encouragement and, to some extent, coercion. Peasants without land, refugees and soldiers were assigned to plots of land which they were to farm, while the implements required (such as ploughs and oxen) were provided by the government at a low price. In exchange for this, the peasant was to give over half of his harvest to the government.

The tuntian system had its origins in the military, and for much of the Han dynasty the land in question was farmed by soldiers on orders of the military authorities; in this case all of the crop harvested was to be kept by the military for supply uses, following the example set by Emperor Wu. Cao Cao's innovation was the introduction of the 'civilian tuntian' on a large scale both for common people and for soldiers during peacetime, whereby he successfully solved two great economic problems facing his administration: the large number of unemployed refugees, and the great tracts of land abandoned by big proprietors in the preceding chaos.

=== Impact ===
The tuntian system was to have far-reaching effects, both for Cao Cao himself and for the overall economy of China. Once the scheme had proven successful initially, Cao Cao wasted no time in extending the scheme to all areas under his control; as a result the positive effects of this organised farming was soon felt all over northern China, which he reunified.

In the short-term, meanwhile, the tuntian system was also instrumental to the success of Cao Cao's campaigns, many of which were long-range offensives across the plains of northern China; with a massive and efficient agriculture to support his army, he was able to sustain these offensives and gain victory. Overall, the tuntian system, along with the repair of irrigation works, were among the foremost contributions of Cao Cao to the economy of the Han dynasty, and contributed to the enduring strength of the state of Cao Wei in the Three Kingdoms period.

== Ming dynasty ==
The tuntian in Ming dynasty had two variants, known as the tunpu (屯堡) and weisuo (衛所制).

== Qing dynasty ==
Tuntian was widely practiced to fight the Dungan Revolt (1862–1877).

== People's Republic of China ==
The sites of tuntian were known as tuanchang (团场, literally "Regiment farms"), bingtuan (兵团) or kenqü (垦区) in the PRC. From 1953 and as of its reforms in 1981, tuanchang, like its predecessors in Qing dynasty, could be characterized as military-agricultural colonies. After the Korean War in 1953, tuanchang were established and resided by demobilized soldiers and their families, who formed the Xinjiang Production and Construction Corps (XPCC).

The economic production of the XPCC remains mostly agricultural products in the 21st century. It controls a quarter of Xinjiang's arable land and dominates the province's agricultural output. Historically the XPCC had also established mining operations and related industries, but most of these have been transferred to the Xinjiang government.

In Xinjiang, a series of tuanchang were created along the border after the Yi–Ta incident in 1962, which 60,000 Chinese nationals living at the border, mostly ethnic Kazakhs, defected to Soviet Union and ended up in a violent putdown by China. These border tuanchang are known as frontier farms (边疆农场).

Other government-owned agricultural developments in the PRC not under the jurisdiction of XPCC were generally known as nóngkěn (农垦), under the jurisdiction of Ministry of Nongken (1956–1970, 1979–1982).

=== Natural and manmade hazards ===
Locations of bingtuan are strategic but often face life-threatening natural and manmade hazards, including floods, and fire.

The deadliest and costliest flood affecting the bingtuan were the July 1996 North Xinjiang floods, which led to several poorly designed Great Leap Forward-era dams, managed by both bingtuan and civilians, collapsing or being manually breached.

The deadliest fire in PRC history was at a bingtuan site, the Xinjiang 61st Regiment Farm fire during the 1977 Chinese New Year. The fire killed 37% (597/1600) of all school-aged children at the farm and destroyed its demographic structure.

== Elsewhere ==
The term tuntian was adopted by other regimes in the Sinosphere, forming their own readings, some of which are Sino-Xenic.

=== Taiwan ===
The Han-led Kingdom of Tungning practiced a variant of the Ming-era tuntian system. The system was established by Koxinga immediately after landing in 1661 to supply his troops. Many places in southwest Taiwan retain their tuntian names.

=== Vietnam ===
The Sino-Vietnamese reading is đồn điền in Vietnamese. During the Nam tiến (March to the South), Khmer and Cham territory was seized and militarily colonised by the Vietnamese. The Nguyen Lords established đồn điền after 1790.

The South Vietnamese and Communist Vietnamese colonisation of the Central Highlands have been compared to the historic Nam tiến of previous Vietnamese rulers. The South Vietnamese leader Ngo Dinh Diem sponsored colonisation of Northern Vietnamese Catholic refugees on Montagnard land. The now Communist Vietnamese government introduced to the Central Highlands of "New Economic Zones".

=== Japan ===
Tuntian is pronounced tonden as a Sino-Japanese word. It was most notably practiced during the Meiji Restoration in frontier Hokkaido under the name tondenhei ("tonden-soldiers").

=== Korea ===
The Sino-Korean reading of tuntian is dunjeon (or tunjŏn in the North Korean Romanization). Dunjeon was a core part of the Korean military supply and was notable in the following instances:

- During the Qing invasion of Joseon, at Namhansanseong. This system supported a population of 25,000, 10,000 of which were combatants.
- During the Imjin War, under Yi Sun-sin. He managed dunjeon both as part of his repeated demotion (due to court politics) and on his naval base of Hansando.

== Place names ==
Places with a history of tuntian cultivation may be named after the practice.

- Tonden, Kita-ku, Sapporo, Japan
- Higashi-Tondendori Station, Chūō-ku, Sapporo, Japan
- Dunjeon station, Yongin, South Korea
- Tunjon station, South Hamgyong Province, North Korea

The following areas contain place names derived from a systematic tuntian designation:

- Various place names in Taiwan, under Koxinga's rule, commonly ending with 營 or 庄.
- Various place names in China, especially Xinjiang, Inner Mongolia, and Heilongjiang.

== See also ==
- Agriculture in China
- Allotment system
- Economic history of China
- Theme (Byzantine district)
