= Xiangyang (disambiguation) =

Xiangyang (襄阳) is a prefecture-level city in Hubei, China.

Xiangyang (simplified Chinese: 向阳; traditional Chinese: 向陽; pinyin: Xiàngyáng) may refer to:

- Xiangyang Mountain, a 3,603-metre-high (11,821 ft) mountain in the Central Mountain Range of Taiwan

== Districts ==
- Xiangyang District, Hegang, Heilongjiang
- Xiangyang District, Jiamusi, Heilongjiang

== Subdistricts ==
- Xiangyang Subdistrict, Fuyang, in Yingdong District, Fuyang, Anhui
- Xiangyang Subdistrict, Xuancheng, in Xuanzhou District, Xuancheng, Anhui
- Xiangyang Subdistrict, Beijing, in Fangshan District, Beijing
- Xiangyang Subdistrict, Qinzhou, in Qinnan District, Qinzhou, Guangxi
- Xiangyang Subdistrict, Jixi, in Jiguan District, Jixi, Heilongjiang
- Xiangyang Subdistrict, Mudanjiang, in Aimin District, Mudanjiang, Heilongjiang
- Xiangyang Subdistrict, Chifeng, in Songshan District, Chifeng, Inner Mongolia
- Xiangyang Subdistrict, Zhalantun, Inner Mongolia
- Xiangyang Subdistrict, Jiujiang, in Xunyang District, Jiujiang, Jiangxi
- Xiangyang Subdistrict, Jilin City, in Chuanying District, Jilin City, Jilin
- Xiangyang Subdistrict, Taonan, Jilin
- Xiangyang Subdistrict, Chaoyang, in Longcheng District, Chaoyang, Liaoning
- Xiangyang Subdistrict, Tieling, in Qinghe District, Tieling, Liaoning
- Xiangyang Subdistrict, Weinan, in Linwei District, Weinan, Shaanxi
- Xiangyang Subdistrict, Yantai, in Zhifu District, Yantai, Shandong
- Xiangyang Subdistrict, Shihezi, Xinjiang

== Towns ==
- Xiangyang, Tian'e County, Guangxi
- Xiangyang, Jidong County, Heilongjiang
- Xiangyang, Tongjiang, Heilongjiang
- Xiangyang, Wuchang, Heilongjiang
- Xiangyang, Xiangfang District, Harbin, Heilongjiang
- Xiangyang, Liuhe County, Jilin
- Xiangyang, Ziyang County, Shaanxi
- Xiangyang, Shanxi, in Jiancaoping District, Taiyuan, Shanxi
- Xiangyang, Guanghan, Sichuan

== Townships ==
- Xiangyang Township, Anhui, in Lingbi County, Anhui
- Xiangyang Township, Fujian, in Nan'an, Fujian
- Xiangyang Township, Jiayin County, Heilongjiang
- Xiangyang Township, Zhaodong, in Zhaodong, Heilongjiang
- Xiangyang Township, Liaoning, in Huanren Manchu Autonomous County, Liaoning
- Xiangyang Township, Sichuan, in Puge County, Sichuan
- Xiangyang Township, Yunnan, in Luxi County, Yunnan

== People ==
- Xiang Yang, Singaporean singer-songwriter and actor

== See also ==
- Yangyang County, in Gangwon Province, South Korea
