= 122nd Regiment (XPCC) =

The 122nd Regiment (新疆生产建设兵团第122团), together with its reclamation area, commonly known as the 122nd Regiment Farm (兵团122团场), is a historic agriculture and construction regiment of the 8th Division of Xinjiang Production and Construction Corps. The regiment was formerly known as the 73rd Regiment of the 25th Infantry Division of the 9th Army of the 22rd Corps of the PLA. It was amalgamated into the 121st Regiment in June 2006. The regiment was located in Shawan County, Xinjiang Uygur Autonomous Region, China, and based in Dongye Town (东野镇). Its reclaimed land is located in the northern foot of the Tianshan Mountains, southwest of the Junggar Basin, and on the west bank of the Manas River. The geographical coordinates are 44°37′- 44°48′ north latitude, 85°27′- 85°41′ east longitude, 19.8 kilometers wide from east to west, 31 kilometers long from north to south, with a total area of 248.47 square kilometers. The cultivated land area is 9.733 thousand hectares. As of 2000 Census, the regiment had a population of 17,724.

== History ==
The regiment was formerly known as the 73rd Regiment of the 25th Infantry Division of the 9th Army of the 22rd Corps of the PLA. In June 1953, it was renamed the 19th Regiment of the 7th Agricultural Construction Division of the Xinjiang Military Region. In October 1954, it was formed into the 7th Division of the Xinjiang Production and Construction Corps. In 1956, it moved from Paotai (炮台) to the sast of Xiayedi (下野地) and changed its name to the 19th Regiment of 7th Xinjiang Agricultural Construction Division.

In July 1969, the Xinjiang Production and Construction Corps (XPCC) unified the designation of its regiments and divisions, the name of the regiment was changed to the 122nd Regiment from the 19th Regiment. With the abolishment of the XPCC in March 1975, the 7th Division was canceled in May of the same year, the 122nd Regiment was transferred to Shihezi Prefecture (石河子地区), and renamed as the 122nd Regiment Farm of Shihezi Prefecture (石河子地区一二二团场). In August 1978, Shihezi Prefecture was abolished, the establishment of the Shihezi Agriculture, Industry and Commerce Joint Enterprise Group Corporation (石河子农工商联合企业), with Shihezi City co-office. In December 1981, the XPCC's structure was restored, and in May 1982, the 8th Agricultural Construction Division was restored in Shihezi City, and the 122nd Regiment Farm of Shihezi was renamed the 122nd Regiment of 8th Agricultural Construction Division. The 122nd Regiment was amalgamated into the 121st Regiment in June 2006.
