= 121st Regiment (Xinjiang Production and Construction Corps) =

The 121st Regiment of Xinjiang Production and Construction Corps (新疆生产建设兵团第121团), also known as the 121st Regiment of the XPCC (兵团121团), together with its reclamation area, commonly known as the 121st Regiment Farm (兵团121团场), is an economic and paramilitary formed unit, that is part of the 8th Division (兵团八师). The regiment was formerly known as the 75th Regiment of the 25th Infantry Division of the 9th Army of the 22nd Corps of the PLA. The 122nd Regiment was amalgamated into the regiment in June 2006. The regiment is headquartered in Paotai Town (炮台镇) in Shawan County, Xinjiang Uygur Autonomous Region, it is composed of 37 agricultural construction companies. As of the 2010 census, its population was 38,320.

The headquarters of the regiment is located in Paotai Town, 213 km away from Urumqi in the east, 78 km from Shihezi in the southeast, 110 km from Karamay in the northwest, and 120 km from Kuitun in the southwest. The county-level road of Guxin Line (县道古新线) and the Keyu Expressway (克榆高速公路, Karamay - Yushugou) cross the territory, and connected with contact line, its traffic is very convenient.

== History ==
The regiment was formerly the 75th Regiment of the 25th Infantry Division of the 9th Army of the 22nd Corps of the PLA. In 1950, it entered Paotai in Shawan County for land reclamation production. In June 1953, it was renamed the 21st Regiment of the 7th Agricultural Construction Division of the Xinjiang Military Region.

With the establishment of the Xinjiang Military Region Production Corps (present Xinjiang Production and Construction Corps, "XPCC" for short) in October 1954, the 21st Regiment was reorganized into the 7th Agricultural Construction Division. The 21st Regiment was divided into two parts of the 21st Regiment and Paotai Farm (炮台农场) in 1957, and both of the two were amalgamated into the 21st Regiment in the early 1960s; the Xiabahu Farm (下八户农场) was formed in Xiabahu area in the same year; the Xiabahu Farm was incorporated into the 21st Regiment in 1961, the 21st Regiment was under the jurisdiction of the 1st Xiayedi Administrative Office (下野地第一管理处) of the 7th Division.

In July 1969, the Xinjiang Production and Construction Corps (XPCC) unified the designation of its regiments and divisions, the name of the regiment was changed to the 121st Regiment from the 21st Regiment. With the abolishment of the XPCC in March 1975, the 7th Division was canceled in May of the same year, the 121st Regiment was transferred to Shihezi Prefecture (石河子地区), and renamed as the 121st Regiment Farm of Shihezi Prefecture (石河子地区一二二团场). In August 1978, Shihezi Prefecture was abolished, the establishment of the Shihezi Agriculture, Industry and Commerce Joint Enterprise Group Corporation (石河子农工商联合企业), with Shihezi City co-office. In December 1981, the XPCC's structure was restored, and in May 1982, the 8th Agricultural Construction Division was restored in Shihezi City, and the 121st Regiment Farm of Shihezi was renamed the 121st Regiment of 8th Agricultural Construction Division. The 122nd Regiment ceased to exist as a separate unit, it was amalgamated into the 121st Regiment in June 2006.

The reclaimed land of the former 121st Regiment had a total area of 456.26 square kilometers, its cultivated land area was 25,333 hectares. As of 2000 Census, the regiment had a population of 22,540.
