= Paotai =

Paotai may refer to:

- Paotai Town (Jieyang) (炮台镇), China
- Paotai, Liaoning (炮台镇), in Wafangdian, Liaoning, China
- Paotai Town (炮台镇), an unincorporated town in Shawan County, Xinjiang Uyghur Autonomous Region, the seat of 121st Regiment headquarters of the Xinjiang Production and Construction Corps.
