= Xiaojiang Chen =

Chinese-American virologist, immunologist, and structural biologist

Xiaojiang S. Chen
- Born: 1963 (age 62–63); Hunan, China
- Known for: Virology, Immunology, Molecular Biology and Structural Biology

Academic background
- Education: BS in Biology; PhD in Biochemistry and Molecular Biology, Virology
- Alma mater: Shihezi University, China; University of California, USA

Academic work
- Institutions: University of Southern California (USC), USA; University of Colorado, USA; Harvard University, USA

Xiaojiang S. Chen (Chinese: 陈小江; born in 1963) is a Chinese-American virologist, immunologist, and structural biologist. He is a professor of Biological Sciences and Chemistry and Director of the Center of Excellence in Nano Biophysics/Structural Biology at the University of Southern California.

Chen is most known for his work on structural molecular virology and cancer biology. He has made distinct discoveries in the fields of viral replication, tumor suppression, cell proliferation, and DNA transaction (replication, mutation and repair).

Chen is a Fellow of the American Association for the Advancement of Science (AAAS).

== Early life and education ==
Chen was born in Hunan, China in 1963. He completed his bachelor's degree from Shihezi University based in China in 1982 and moved to California where he earned his PhD in Biochemistry and Molecular Biology, Virology from the University of California, Davis under the guidance of George Bruening. Following his Ph.D., he undertook a post-doctoral fellowship with Stephen C. Harrison at Harvard University studying X-ray crystallography and structural molecular virology.

== Career ==
In 1999, Chen became an assistant professor at the University of Colorado, School of Medicine, and was promoted to associate professor in 2003. Following that, he joined the University of Southern California (USC) in 2004 as a professor of Biological Sciences and Chemistry in USC Dornsife College and as an adjunct professor at Norris Cancer Center in the Keck School of Medicine at USC. He is currently appointed as Founding Director at the Center of Excellence NanoBiophysics/Structural Biology at USC. Since 2016, he has been serving as a member of the Scientific Advisory board at Tower Cancer Research Foundation.

== Awards and honors ==
- 2017 – Elected Fellow of the American Association for the Advancement of Science (AAAS)
