= 152nd Brigade =

152nd Brigade may refer to:

== Ukraine ==
- 152nd Jaeger Brigade

== United Kingdom ==
- 152nd Infantry Brigade (United Kingdom)

== United States ==
- 152nd Cavalry Brigade
- 152nd Depot Brigade

== See also ==
- 152nd Division (disambiguation)
- 152nd Regiment (disambiguation)
