= 東野 =

東野 or 东野 is an East Asian character for a word or morpheme that means Eastern Plains.

It may refer to:

- Azumano, one of junior high schools in Kanagawa Prefecture
- Dongya, one of the sobriquets of Korea
- Dongye, Xinjiang, in Shawan County, Xinjiang
- Higashino, a common Japanese surname
- Tono (name)#Surname, a common Japanese surname
