= TCRF =

TCRF may refer to:

- The Cutting Room Floor (website), a website for cataloguing and documenting unused and debug content in video games.
- The Tower Cancer Research Foundation
