= 152nd =

152nd is the ordinal form of the number 152. 152nd or One hundred and fifty-second may also refer to:

- A fraction, 1/152, equal to one of 152 equal parts

== Geography ==
- 152nd meridian east, a line of longitude
- 152nd meridian west, a line of longitude

== Military ==
- 152nd Brigade (disambiguation)
- 152nd Division (disambiguation)
- 152nd Regiment (disambiguation)

== See also ==
- June 1, 152nd day of the year in a standard year
