= Higashino =

Higashino (written: 東野) is a Japanese surname. Notable people with the surname include:

- Arisa Higashino (東野 有紗, born 1996), Japanese badminton player
- Keigo Higashino (東野 圭吾, born 1958), Japanese writer
- Koji Higashino (東野 幸治, born 1967), Japanese comedian and television presenter
- Miki Higashino (東野 美紀, born 1968), Japanese video game composer
- Taka Higashino (東野 貴行, born 1985), Japanese motorcycle racer
- Tomoya Higashino (東野 智弥, born 1970), Japanese basketball coach

== See also ==
- Higashino Station (disambiguation), multiple train stations in Japan
