= 152nd Division =

152nd Division or 152nd Infantry Division may refer to:

- 152nd Division (People's Republic of China)
- 152nd Infantry Division (France)
- 152nd Infantry Division "Piceno", Italy
- 152nd Division (Imperial Japanese Army)
- 152nd Rifle Division, Soviet Union

== See also ==
- List of military divisions by number
- 152nd Brigade (disambiguation)
- 152nd Regiment (disambiguation)
- 152nd Squadron (disambiguation)
- 152nd (disambiguation)
