= Shihezi Headquarters Farm =

The Shihezi Headquarters Farm (石河子总场) is an economic and paramilitary formed unit at regiment-level in Xinjiang Production and Construction Corps (XPCC), that is part of the 8th Division of the XPCC (兵团第八师). The farm is headquartered in Beiqun Town (北泉镇) of Shihezi City, Xinjiang Uygur Autonomous Region, China. It is composed of 23 companies and 11 residential communities. As of 2018, its population was about 8,5000. The Shihezi Headquarters Farm is co-located with Beiquan Town Government.

With the approval of the government of the autonomous region and the Ministry of Civil Affairs in 1999, the Beiquan Town Government was formally established, the town was implemented a special management system with Shihezi Headquarters Farm for co-location work and named as Beiquan Town of Shihezi Headquarters Farm (石河子总场北泉镇), it is also the first administrative town directly managed by the Corps (XPCC). The total area of Shihezi Headquarters Farm is 475.76 square kilometers (including 195.2 square kilometers of Beiquan Town), and its cultivated land is 18,733 hectares. Within the jurisdiction, there are national Agricultural High-tech Park (农业高新技术园), provincial-level Beiquan Town Industrial Park (北泉乡镇工业园), and the 8th Division Industrial Park of the Corps (兵团第八师工业园). As of 2017, the farm's GDP was CN¥5,670 million (US$840 million) with the proportion of the three industries 20:31:49, its fixed asset investment was CN¥1,636 million (US$242 million).

== History ==
At the beginning of 1950, the formerly 78th Regiment of the 26th Infantry Division of the 9th Army of the 22nd Corps of the PLA arrived in the place and began an arduous start. In May 1953, the 78th Regiment was renamed the 24th Regiment of the 8th Agricultural Construction Division of the Corps (the XPCC). At the same time, there was a Tractor Training Farm directly under the Corps (兵团直属拖拉机实习农场), and later it was renamed as the Tractor-plowing Farm (机耕农场). In February 1958, it was renamed Shihezi Farm (石河子农场). In April 1959, the 24th Regiment and Shihezi Farm merged to form the Shihezi Headquarters Farm. In November 1969, Shihezi Headquarters Farm was divided into 145th Regiment and 146th Regiment farms; in December 1978, the two farms were incorporated into the present Shihezi Headquarters Farm.

== Geography ==
The Beiquan Town of Shihezi Headquarters Farm is located in the northern edge of Tianshan Mountain, the southern side of the Jungar Basin, the west bank of the Manas River and the northern suburb of Shihezi City. It lies along the economic belt of the Northern Slope of Tianshan Mountain and the central area of the Golden Triangle between Ürümqi, Karamay and Wusu in the province. The farm is only 9 kilometers away from Shihezi Railway Station and Wuyi (Ürümqi - Yining) Expressway, 130 kilometers away from Ürümqi International Airport in the east and is connected by highway, and three high-grade highways of the G312, S201 (Emin - Yushugou), S204 (Mosuowan - Shihezi) cross north to south in the farm.

== See also ==
- List of township-level divisions of Xinjiang

== Website ==
- Official Website
