= Shihezi Economic and Technological Development Zone =

The Shihezi Economic and Technological Development Zone (Chinese: 石河子经济技术开发区) is an economic and technical development zone at the national level located in the eastern suburbs of Shihezi City, Xinjiang Uygur Autonomous Region, China. It is situated east to Hetan Road (河滩路), west to the Dongsi and Dongqi Roads (东七路), south to the Northern Xinjiang railway, north to G312 National Highway, the total planning area is 11.2 square kilometers.

== Formation and history ==
The development zone is the manufacturing center of 8th Division of Xinjiang Production and Construction Corps and Shihezi City, it was established in December 1992 with the approval of the Government of Xinjiang Uygur Autonomous Region, and in 1996 the Science and Technology Commission of the Autonomous Region approved the establishment of an industrial technology park in the area. On April 24, 2000, it was upgraded to a national economic and technological development zone with the approval of the State Council. It was identified as the "Third Batch of Processing Trade Gradient Transfer Base" (第三批加工贸易梯度转移重点承接地) by the Ministry of Commerce, Ministry of Human Resources and Social Security, and General Administration of Customs on November 5, 2010, and the "A-Class National New Materials High-tech Industrialization Base" (A类国家新材料高新技术产业化基地) by the Ministry of Science and Technology on March 14, 2014.

The development zone is entrusted to manage the unified development and construction of the North Industrial Park (石河子工业园) and the Chemical New Material Industrial Park (石河子化工新材料产业园). The total planned area of one zone and two parks was 72.6 square kilometers. The functional departments and offices of the Development Zone Management Committee include the Comprehensive Office (综合办公室), the Finance Bureau (财政局), the Land Planning and Construction Bureau (土地规划建设局), the Economic Development Bureau (经济发展局), the Social Development Bureau (社会发展局), the Investment Service Center (投资服务中心), the Information Center (信息中心) and the Investment Promotion Center (招商中心). Under the jurisdiction of the Dongcheng Subdistrict Office (东城街道办事处) in the development zone, there are other agencies implemented dual leadership, such as business service, taxation, justice and police organizations.

In 2018, the development zone achieved a GDP of CN¥21.52 billion (US$3.25 billion), up 6.5% YoY, of which the value added of the secondary industry was CN¥15,580 million (US$2,354 million), up 8.2% YoY, and the value added of the tertiary industry was CN¥5,940 million (US$898 million), up 2.4% YoY. The fixed assets investment was CN¥5,290 million (US$799 million), down 51.1% YoY. 55 new projects were signed, CN¥27,420 million (US$4,144 million) was invested, its tax was about CN¥6 billion (US$907 million), and 470 new registered enterprises were added, reaching a total of 3,180 in 2018.

== Large enterprises ==
There are four large companies registered in the development zone, including three listed companies.

- Tianshan Aluminum (天山铝业, Tianshan Aluminum Limited by Share Ltd; 新疆生产建设兵团第八师天山铝业股份有限公司)
- Xinjiang Tianfu (新疆天富, Xinjiang Tianfu Energy Co., Ltd; 新疆天富能源股份有限公司; SSE:600509)
- Xinjiang Tianye (新疆天业, Xinjiang Tianye Co., Ltd; 新疆天业股份有限公司; SSE:600075)
- Western Animal Husbandry (西部牧业, Xinjiang Western Animal Husbandry Co., Ltd; 新疆西部牧业股份有公司; SZSE:300106)

Four non-locally registered large companies set up branches here

- Huaxing Glass (华兴玻璃, Guangdong Huaxing Glass Limited Co., Ltd; 广东华兴玻璃股份有限公司)
- Hoshine Silicon Industry (合盛硅业, Hoshine Silicon Industry Co., Ltd; 合盛硅业股份有限公司; SSE:603260)
- HuaFang Textile (华芳纺织, HuaFang Textile Co., Ltd; 华芳纺织股份有限公司; SSE:600273)
- Yurun Food (雨润食品, Yurun Food Group Limited; 雨润食品集团有限公司; SEHK:01068)
