= 8th Division of Xinjiang Production and Construction Corps =

8th Division of XPCC
- Active: 1953–1975; 1981 - present
- Country: China
- Allegiance: Chinese Communist Party
- Branch: Xinjiang Production and Construction Corps
- Type: Division; Paramilitary organisation State-owned enterprise
- Headquarters: Shihezi, Xinjiang
- Website: www.shz.gov.cn

Commanders
- Political Commissar: E Hongda (鄂宏达) (CCP Secretary of Shihezi)
- Commander: Ge Zhihui (葛志辉) (Mayor of Shihezi)

The 8th Division (Chinese: 新疆生产建设兵团第八师; abbreviation for Chinese: 兵团八师) is a division of the Xinjiang Production and Construction Corps (XPCC) distributed over Shihezi and Karamay cities, Manas and Shawan counties, Xinjiang Uygur Autonomous Region, China. It is an economic and paramilitary unit formed in 1953 from the former 26th Infantry Division of the 9th Army of the 22nd Corps of the PLA. The 8th Agricultural Construction Division (农业建设第八师; abbreviation for 农八师) was approved and renamed to the present 8th Division of the XPCC in 2012. The division is composed of 14 regiments, and headquartered in Shihezi City, it merges work in one official with Shihezi City. The Shihezi Reclamation Area of the 8th Division has an area of 5,851 square kilometers with a total population of 696,900 and a permanent population of 661,300 (as of 2018), of that, the Shihezi City has an area of 460 square kilometers with a total population of 448,100 and a permanent population of 437,900 (as of 2018). In the year of 2018, GDP of the 8th Division was CN¥54.85 billion (US$8.29 billion), and the GDP per capita CN¥82,584 (US$12,480).

Since the establishment of Shihezi City in April 1975, the 8th Division and the city have practised management model of unity of the division and Shihezi City. The Shihezi Agriculture, Industry and Commerce Joint Enterprise Group Corporation (石河子农工商联合企业) was formed in the reclamation area of the former 8th division in February 1979, the group corporation is co-located with Shihezi City and is integrated into administrative and business enterprises. In December 1981, the XPCC was restored, and its 8th Agriculture and Production Division (renamed as the 8th Division of XPCC in 2012 ) was resumed at the same time, from then onwards the 8th Division has enjoyed the same institution and two brands, and continued to work with Shihezi City.

== History ==
On December 20, 1949, the former Kuomintang 78th Division, 227th Brigade (二二七旅), Cavalry Regiment of 178th Brigade (一七八旅骑兵团), 194th Regiment of 65th Brigade (六五旅一九四团), Munition Battalion of 42nd Division (四二师辎重营) were incorporated as the 26th Infantry Division of the 9th Army of the 22nd Corps of the PLA. Its leaders were the division chief Luo Ruzheng (罗汝正), political commissar Wang Jilong (王季龙), 1st deputy division chief Gao Rongguang (高戎光), 2nd deputy division chief Zhou Mao (周茂), chief of staff Xiong Lüe (熊略), director of the political department Yu Zhengdong (鱼正东). The division was headquartered in the county seat of Jinghua County (景化县; present Hutubi County). It had the 76th Regiment, the 77th Regiment, the 78th Regiment, and a munition battalion (辎重营).

=== 26th Infantry Division ===
In March 1950, the 26th Infantry Division relocated its headquarters from Jinghua County to Suilai County (绥来县, the present Manas County). In March 1953, the troops of Xinjiang Military Region (新疆军区, XMR) were reorganized, and the 26th Division was integrated into the XMR. It was renamed to the 8th Agricultural Construction Division of the XMR. The three regiments under its jurisdiction were renamed as the 22nd, 23rd and 24 Regiment of the agricultural construction division. On May 27, the 8th Agricultural Construction Division was ordered by the Central Military Commission (CMC) and changed to be a production force as a whole to produce on its place. In August 1953, the 8th Agricultural Construction Division moved its headquarters from Manas County to Shihezi.

=== 8th Agricultural Construction Division ===
On August 6, 1954, the CMC General Staff (军委总参谋部) issued a decree to revoke the XMR Production Management Department (新疆军区生产管理部) and the 22nd Corps (二十二兵团), and establish the XMR Production and Construction Corps (新疆军区生产建设兵团, XPCC). On October 7 of the same year, the XMR issued an order to announce the organization of the XMR Production and Construction Corps and the designation of its competent forces. The 8th Agricultural Construction Division officially belonged to the leadership of the XMR Production and Construction Corps on November 1, 1954. In February 1955, the 10th Agricultural Construction Division was abolished, and the 30th regiment and labor reform detachment of the 10th division were merged into the 8th Agricultural Construction Division. From May 21 to 26, 1956, the first CPC Congress of the 8th Agricultural Construction Division was held. Elected the first committee of 15 people, Yu Zhengdong (鱼正东) was the CPC secretary, and Liu Bingzhen (刘炳正) was the CPC deputy secretary.

On August 29, 1967, the temporary Cultural Revolution Committee of the 8th Agricultural Construction Division was established. On October 4, Gong Jianzhang (龚建章) was appointed as the director. On December 2, 1968, the 8th Agricultural Construction Division established a temporary CPC committee with five members of the standing committee, Duan Yifeng (段一峰) as the secretary, and Xiao Fengrui (肖凤瑞) as the deputy secretary. In August of the same year, the division held the Cultural Revolutionary Activist Conference, and elected the Cultural Revolutionary Committee of the division, with 61 members, 23 members of the Standing Committee, Director Duan Yifeng, and 2nd Director Xiao Fengrui (肖凤瑞).

On July 7, 1969, the XPCC made a decision to change the new military designation of army units in the corps: the former 7th Anjihai Farm (安集海七场) of the 8th Agricultural Construction Division was changed as 141st Regiment, the 22nd Regiment Farm (二十二团农场) as the 142nd Regiment, the 23rd Regiment Farm (二十三团农场) as the 143rd Regiment, Shihezi headquarters Farm (石河子总场) as the 145th Regiment and 146th Regiment, the 30th Regiment Farm (三十团农场) as the 147th Regiment, the 2nd Mosuowan Farm (莫索湾二场) as the 148th Regiment, the 5th Mosuowan Farm (莫索湾五场) as the 149th Regiment, Gongqingtuan Farm (共青团农场) as the 150th Regiment, Ziniquan breedingsheep Farm (紫泥泉种羊场) as the 151st Regiment. At the end of the year, 144th Regiment was formed.

On June 1–4, 1971, the 8th Agricultural Construction Division held the 2nd CPC Congress, and elected 43 members of its 2nd committee. The committee elected 12 members of the Standing Committee, and Duan Yifeng served as Secretary and Zhang Shengke as Deputy secretary. On April 20, 1975, the CPC Central Committee approved "Request for Strengthening the CPC's Unified Leadership and Changing the XPCC", and agreed to revoke the XPCC and its affiliated organizations. According to the arrangement, the 8th Agricultural Construction Division was cancelled.

=== Present ===
On December 3, 1981, the CPC Central Committee, the State Council and the Central Military Commission decided to resume the Xinjiang Production and Construction Corps system and be under the dual leadership of Xinjiang Uygur Autonomous Region and the Ministry of Agriculture and Land Reclamation (农垦部). The 8th Agricultural Construction Division was resumed and the use of the military designation began on May 25, 1982. the 8th Agricultural Construction Division of the XPCC (新疆生产建设兵团农业建设农八师; abbreviation for 兵团农八师) was approved to rename as the present 8th Division of Xinjiang Production and Construction Corps by the State Commission Office for Public Sector Reform on October 25, 2012.

== Regiments ==
13 Regiments and the Headquarters Farm of the 8th Division of Xinjiang Production and Construction Corps
Present regiments		Former regiments		Based on places		Counties		2000 Census	2010 Census
8th Division	兵团8师	8th Division	兵团农8师					590,115	624,377
Shihezi	石河子	Shihezi	石河子	Shihezi	石河子	Shihezi	石河子	298,885	380,130
Shihezi Headquarters Farm	总场	145th Regiment; 146th Regiment	145,146团	Beiquan Town	北泉镇	Shihezi	石河子	52,011	39,631
152nd Regiment	152团	152nd Regiment	152团	South of Shihezi	石河子南	Shihezi	石河子	3,473	3,205
121st Regiment	121团	121st Regiment	121团	Paotai	炮台	Shawan County	沙湾县	22,540	38,320
121st Regiment	121团	122nd Regiment	122团	Dongye	东野	Shawan County	沙湾县	17,724	38,320
133rd Regiment	133团	132nd Regiment	132团	Hongguang	红光	Shawan County	沙湾县	11,167	19,919
133rd Regiment	133团	133rd Regiment	133团	Xiyedi	西野地	Shawan County	沙湾县	13,908	19,919
134th Regiment	134团	134th Regiment	134团	Xiayedi	下野地	Shawan County	沙湾县	15,688	18,801
134th Regiment	134团	135th Regiment	135团	Shamenzi	沙门子	Shawan County	沙湾县	8,531	18,801
141st Regiment	141团	141st Regiment	141团	Beiye	北野	Shawan County	沙湾县	12,328	10,023
142nd Regiment	142团	142nd Regiment	142团	Xin'anji	新安集	Shawan County	沙湾县	30,110	27,588
143rd Regiment	143团	143rd Regiment	143团	Huanyuan	花园	Shawan County	沙湾县	34,025	37,902
143rd Regiment	143团	151st Regiment	151团	Ziniquan	紫泥泉	Shawan County	沙湾县	4,877	37,902
144th Regiment	144团	144th Regiment	144团	Zhongjiazhuang	钟家庄	Shawan County	沙湾县	16,909	11,598
147th Regiment	147团	147th Regiment	147团	Shihutan	十户滩	Manas County	玛纳斯县	17,471	14,311
148th Regiment	148团	148th Regiment	148团	Mosuowan	莫索湾	Manas County	玛纳斯县	30,827	27,302
149th Regiment	149团	149th Regiment	149团	Donggucheng	东古城	Manas County	玛纳斯县	17,967	15,660
150th Regiment	150团	150th Regiment	150团	Xigucheng	西古城	Manas County	玛纳斯县	19,005	14,435
136th Regiment	136团	136th Regiment	136团	Xiaoguai	小拐镇	Karamay District	克拉玛依区	9,804	8,388

== Geography ==
The Shihezi Reclamation Area of the 8th Division is located in the northern foothills of Tianshan, the southern margin of the Junggar Basin, the east longitude is 84°58′- 86°24′, and the north latitude is 43°26′- 45°20. Its agricultural and pastoral regiment farms, and factories and mines in a number of groups, are kept in Shihezi, Karamay cities and Shawan, Manas counties. The northeast is connected with Lanzhouwan Township (兰洲湾乡) and the Xinghu Headquarters Farm (农六师新湖总场) Of the 6th Division in Manas County, the southern part is directly connected to Hejing County in the mountainous region in Shawan County, the west is adjacent to the city of Kuytun in the western part of Shawan County, the north-west is deep into the city of Karamay, and the north is bordered by the Gurbantünggüt Desert.

== Economy ==
According to preliminary accounting, in the year of 2018, the gross domestic product of Shihezi Reclamation Area reached CN¥54,851 million (US$8,289 million), an increase of 4.6% over the previous year. The value added of the primary industry was CN¥8,955 million (US$1,353 million), an increase of 7.8%, the value added of the secondary industry decreased by 5.6% to CN¥19,764 million (US$2,987 million), and the value added of the tertiary industry was CN¥25,059 million (US$3,787 million), an increase of 12.8%. The GDP per capita is CN¥82,584 (US$12,480). At the end of the year, 330,400 people were employed in the reclamation area.

=== Agriculture ===
As of 2018, the total output value of agriculture, forestry, animal husbandry and fishery was CN¥20,744 million (US$3,135 million), an increase of 6.1% over the previous year. The annual crop planting area was 286.7 thou hectares, among them, the grain sown area is 13.57 thou hectares, and the cotton planting area is 25.21 thou hectares. The annual total grain output was 122 thou tons, the total cotton output was 610.6 thou tons, the vegetables were 449.1 thou tons, the fruit output was 253.4 thou tons, and the industrial tomato sauce was 127.2 thou tons. The annual total meat output was 90.1 thou tons, the milk output was 268.7 thou tons, and the eggs were 17.6 thou tons. At the end of the year, there were 860.2 thou heads of livestock, including 105.6 thou heads of cattle, 522.6 thou heads of pigs and 232.2 thou sheep. The number of livestock on hand was 1.129 million heads, including 47.2 thou heads of cattle, 908.1 thou heads of pigs and 171.2 thou sheep. The annual output of aquatic products was 9,500 tons.

=== Manufacturing industry ===
In the manufacturing sector, the 8th Division is based on cotton yarns, chemicals, cement, electrolytic aluminium, raw coal mining, food and beverages, and food materials as the pillar industries. In year of 2018, the 8th Division produced 133.16 thou tons of cotton yarn, 2.16 million tons of calcium carbide, 1.30 million tons of PVC, 0.89 million tons of caustic soda, 0.18 million tons of hydrochloric acid, 54.64 thou tons of plastic products, 2.59 million tons of cement, and electrolytic aluminium 1.17 million tons, raw coal 0.23 million tons, dairy products 60.74 thou tons, tomato sauce 49.76 thou tons, instant noodles 23.19 thou tons, refined edible vegetable oil 53.87 thou tons, wheat flour 41.54 thou tons.

=== Economic and Technological Development Zone ===
The Shihezi Economic and Technological Development Zone is located in the eastern suburbs of Shihezi City. It was established in December 1992 with the approval of the Xinjiang Government and was upgraded to a national economic and technological development zone with the approval of the State Council on April 24, 2000. On March 14, 2014, the Ministry of Science and Technology was recognized as the "A-Class National New Materials High-tech Industrialization Base (A类国家新材料高新技术产业化基地)." In 2018, the development zone achieved a GDP of CN¥21.52 billion (US$3.25 billion), up 6.5% YoY, of which the value added of the secondary industry was CN¥15,580 million (US$2,354 million), up 8.2% YoY, and the value added of the tertiary industry was CN¥5,940 million (US$898 million), up 2.4% YoY. The fixed assets investment was CN¥5,290 million (US$799 million), down 51.1% YoY. 55 new projects were signed, CN¥27,420 million (US$4,144 million) was invested, its tax was about CN¥6 billion (US$907 million), and 470 new registered enterprises were added, reaching a total of 3,180 in 2018.
