= Dongye, Xinjiang =

Unincorporated town in Shawan, Xinjiang, China

Dongye (Chinese: 东野镇; pinyin: Dōngyě Zhèn) is an unincorporated town (非建制镇) located in Shawan County, Xinjiang Uyghur Autonomous Region, China, it was known for the seat of the former 122nd Regiment headquarters of the 8th Division, Xinjiang Production and Construction Corps, one of settlements in the Xinjiang Production and Construction Corps. The town is 83 kilometers southeast of Shihezi City, and 8 kilometers north of Shawan County. As of 2000 census, the town had a population of 17,724.

"Dong" (东) means the east, "Ye" (野) means the Xiayedi (下野地). the town of Dongye was named after its location in the east of Xiayedi. Dongye Town is located in the southern margin of the Junggar Basin and was founded in 1955. The streets in the town are neatly arranged, mainly Yucai Road, Shiji Avenue, Yixin Road, Dongpao Road, Zhongxin Road and Guxin Road. The residential area covers an area of 5.32 square kilometers, with a population of about 9,000, and there are more than 90 commercial outlets such as shopping malls.
