= Paotai Town =

Town in Shawan County, China

Paotai (Chinese: 炮台镇; pinyin: Pàotái Zhèn) is an unincorporated town (非建制镇) located in Shawan County, Xinjiang Uyghur Autonomous Region, China, it is known for the seat of 121st Regiment headquarters of the 8th Division, Xinjiang Production and Construction Corps. The town is 213 km away from Urumqi in the east, 78 km from Shihezi in the southeast, 110 km from Karamay in the northwest, and 120 km from Kuitun in the southwest. The county-level road of Guxin Line (县道古新线) and the Keyu Expressway (克榆高速公路, Karamay - Yushugou) cross the territory, and connected with contact line, its traffic is very convenient.

The territory of the town is also the area of reclaimed land for the 121st Regiment. It has an area of 704.74 square kilometers with a population of 38,320 (as of 2010 census). The name of Paotai (炮台) was the homophonic Chinese word of "bortai" (博克泰) from the Mongolian language, meaning land with deers (有鹿的地方). The town was named for the first time in 1982 census.

== Infrastructure ==
With six vertical and six horizontal streets, street layout of Paotai is gridded. From east to west, they are Donghuan Road (东环路), Xiangyang Road (向阳路), Guangming Road (光明路), Guangming South Road (光明南路), Guangming West Road (光明西路), and West Ring Road (西环路), From south to north, Jian'an Road (建安路), Renmin Road (人民路), Limin Road (利民路), Yucai Road (育才路), and North Ring Road (北环路). There are 21 commercial outlets, such as shopping malls, Pharmacy shops, bookstore, a bank, cable TV for residents. Coverage rate of FM radio stations is 100%. There is also Paotai Plaza (炮台广场), East Park (东公园), farmers' market, nursing home, library, a middle school, a primary school, a kindergarten, and a hospital.
