= 152nd Regiment (XPCC) =

Chinese economic and paramilitary unit in Xinjiang

The 152nd Regiment of Xinjiang Production and Construction Corps (新疆生产建设兵团第152团), also known as the 152nd Regiment of the XPCC (兵团152团), is an economic and paramilitary formed unit, that is part of the 8th Division (兵团第八师). It was formerly known as the Independent Regiment of the XPCC (兵团独立团) formed in 1965. The regiment is headquartered in the south of Shihezi City, Xinjiang Uygur Autonomous Region, China. It is composed of 7 agricultural construction companies.

As of the 2010 census, its population was 3,205. The 152nd Regiment is stationed at No. 294, 1st North Road, 26th Block, Shihezi City. The geographical coordinates of its reclamation area are 44°19′10′′- 44°10′59′′ north latitude, 85°55′45′′- 86°07′35′′ east longitude, 15.6 km wide from east to west, 15.1 km long from north to south, with a total area of 39.32 square kilometers, of which 2,446 hectares of arable land.

The elevation in the reclamation area is low in North and high in South, low in West and high in the East. It is Inclined from the southeast to the northwest, the maximum elevation is 640 meters above sea level, and the lowest elevation is 430 meters. The whole regiment is separated by the Shihezi urban area and Shihezi Township into eight unevenly connected blocks with the G312 National Highway, Wukui Expressway (Urumuqi - Kuytun Expressway) and Northern Xinjiang railway crossing its territory. The climate is cold in winter and hot in summer, with large temperature differences, dry, windy and rainless, low humidity, large evaporation, abundant light and abundant heat. It is a typical continental climate suitable for crop growth. The average annual sunshine hours are 2797.1 hours, and the annual average temperature is 6.5 °C. The average annual frost-free period is 171 days and average annual snow-free days are 99 days. The average annual precipitation is 199.1 mm and annual precipitation days are 65– 80 days. The average annual evaporation is 1535.1 mm and an average annual wind speed of 1.7 m/s.

== History ==
On February 27, 1965, the Direct-subordinate Artillery Regiment of Xinjiang Military Region Production and Construction Corps (新疆军区生产建设兵团直属炮兵团) was incorporated by the veterans from Shenyang Military Region, Beijing Military Region, Nanjing Military Region and the surviving family members of the veterans, and two production teams from the former Direct-managed Farm of the XPPC Agency (兵团司政机关农场), Hongshan Branch of Bayi Livestock Farm of Shihezi Business Management (石河子经营管理处八一畜牧场红山分场), Construction Brigade of Shihezi Management Service (石河子管理处工程大队), the Sideline Team of Bingtuan Agricultural College (兵团农学院副业队). On May 22 of the same year, it was renamed the Independent Regiment of Xinjiang Military Region Production and Construction Corps (新疆军区生产建设兵团独立团) and was directly under the leadership of the Corps.

In January 1969, the Shihezi Command of the Corps (兵团驻石河子指挥部) was established, and the Independent Regiment was under its control. In August of that year, the Manas River Basin Management Office of the Corps (兵团玛纳斯河流域管理处) was incorporated into Water Conservancy Project Battalion (水利工程营) and later upgraded to Water Conservancy Project Regiment (水利工程团) in April 1971, under the command of Shihezi Command of the Corps. In September 1970, the 165th Regiment (一六五团) was relocated to Emin County, the Hongshan portion of the Independent Regiment as its 3rd Battalion.

With the abolishment of Xinjiang Military Region Production and Construction Corps in March 1975, the Independent Regiment of the Corps was transferred to Shihezi Prefecture (石河子地区), and renamed as the Independent Regiment of Shihezi City. In December 1978, after the dissolution of Wuqi Farm (五七农场), its 5th and 7th companies were handed over to the Independent Regiment. In August 1978, Shihezi Prefecture was abolished, the Shihezi Agriculture, Industry and Commerce Joint Enterprise Group Corporation (石河子农工商联合企业) was established, with a Shihezi City co-office. In December 1981, the XPCC's structure was restored and, in May 1982, the 8th Agricultural Construction Division was restored in Shihezi City. The Independent Regiment was under the 8th Agricultural Construction Division. On February 6, 1984, the Independent Regiment changed its name to the present 152nd Regiment. In August 2003, the 152nd Regiment established Xinjiang Baiyang Industrial (Group) Co., Ltd. (新疆白杨实业（集团）有限责任公司), with the administrative leadership of the 152 regiments as the same leadership team.
