= Mitsui Falcons =

- Leagues: JBL
- Founded: 1946
- Folded: 1999
- Location: Kashiwa, Chiba

The Mitsui Falcons were a Japanese basketball team that played in the Japan Basketball League. They were based in Kashiwa, Chiba.

== Notable players ==
- LeRon Ellis
- Marcus Kennedy
- Cornell Parker
- Steve Thompson (basketball, born 1968)
- Demone Webster
- Jeff Webster

== Coaches ==
- Tomoya Higashino (asst)
