= LeRon Ellis =

American basketball player (born 1969)

Personal information
- Born: April 28, 1969 (age 57) Los Angeles, California, U.S.
- Listed height: 6 ft 10 in (2.08 m)
- Listed weight: 225 lb (102 kg)

Career information
- High school: Parkrose (Portland, Oregon); Mater Dei (Santa Ana, California)
- College: Kentucky (1987–1989); Syracuse (1989–1991)
- NBA draft: 1991: 1st round, 22nd overall pick
- Drafted by: Los Angeles Clippers
- Playing career: 1991–2002
- Position: Center
- Number: 22, 43, 28

Career history
- 1991–1992: Los Angeles Clippers
- 1992: Grupo Libro Valladolid
- 1992–1993: Columbus Horizon
- 1993: Hyundai Desio
- 1993–1994: Charlotte Hornets
- 1994–1995: FC Barcelona
- 1995: Miami Heat
- 1996: Connecticut Skyhawks
- 1996–1997: Quad City Thunder
- 1998–1999: Mitsui Falcons
- 2000–2001: Quilmes de Mar del Plata
- 2001–2002: Beijing Olympians

Career highlights
- Second-team All-SEC (1989); First-team Parade All-American (1987); California Mr. Basketball (1987)
- Stats at NBA.com
- Stats at Basketball Reference

LeRon Perry Ellis (born April 28, 1969) is an American former professional basketball player. Ellis was considered to be one of the premier high school basketball players in the nation among the class of 1987 while playing for the top-ranked Southern California prep school squad Mater Dei. Ellis was drafted into the NBA after a mixed college basketball performance at the University of Kentucky and Syracuse University. He suffered several unsuccessful stints in the NBA over three non-consecutive seasons but spent the majority of his professional basketball career playing overseas. LeRon played as a center and is the son of former NBA player LeRoy Ellis.

== Early life ==
LeRon Ellis was born to LeRoy Sr. and Lucille Ellis in Los Angeles, California. Ellis is from an athletic family: his father, LeRoy Ellis, is a 14-year NBA veteran and member of the 1971–72 Los Angeles Lakers championship team, his elder sister Lisa Ellis played women's basketball for California State University, Long Beach and the University of Kentucky and his elder brother LeRoy Jr. played NCAA Division I men's basketball for the University of the Pacific.

LeRoy Ellis traversed the country with the NBA during the first eight years of LeRon's life. The Ellises eventually relocated to Portland, Oregon after LeRoy Sr. retired from basketball. In Portland LeRon Ellis attended Parkrose High School for his freshman and sophomore years. The young student excelled in athletics, playing both basketball and water polo for his school. In 1985 LeRoy moved to Southern California to operate a tire store in Orange County. LeRon decided to join his father even though the rest of the family were planning to move at a later time. The two settled in the city of Anaheim and LeRon Ellis transferred to Mater Dei High School, a nearby private Catholic school with a reputable athletics program. Ellis completed the rest of high school at Mater Dei and enrolled at the University of Kentucky on a basketball scholarship.

== High school career ==
LeRon Ellis began his athletic accomplishments at an early age. He helped lead the Parkrose High School boys' basketball team to the Oregon state semi-finals during his freshman year. Ellis was also selected as part of the 1984 Oregon Boys' High School Water Polo All-Tourney Second Team and his school's water polo team placed third in the Oregon state water polo championship tournament. LeRon Ellis left behind his feats in Portland after two years with Parkrose High for a new start in Southern California. Ellis moved back to California with his father and the two settled in Orange County, where he caught the eye of Gary McKnight, the boys' basketball coach for the nearby Mater Dei High School.

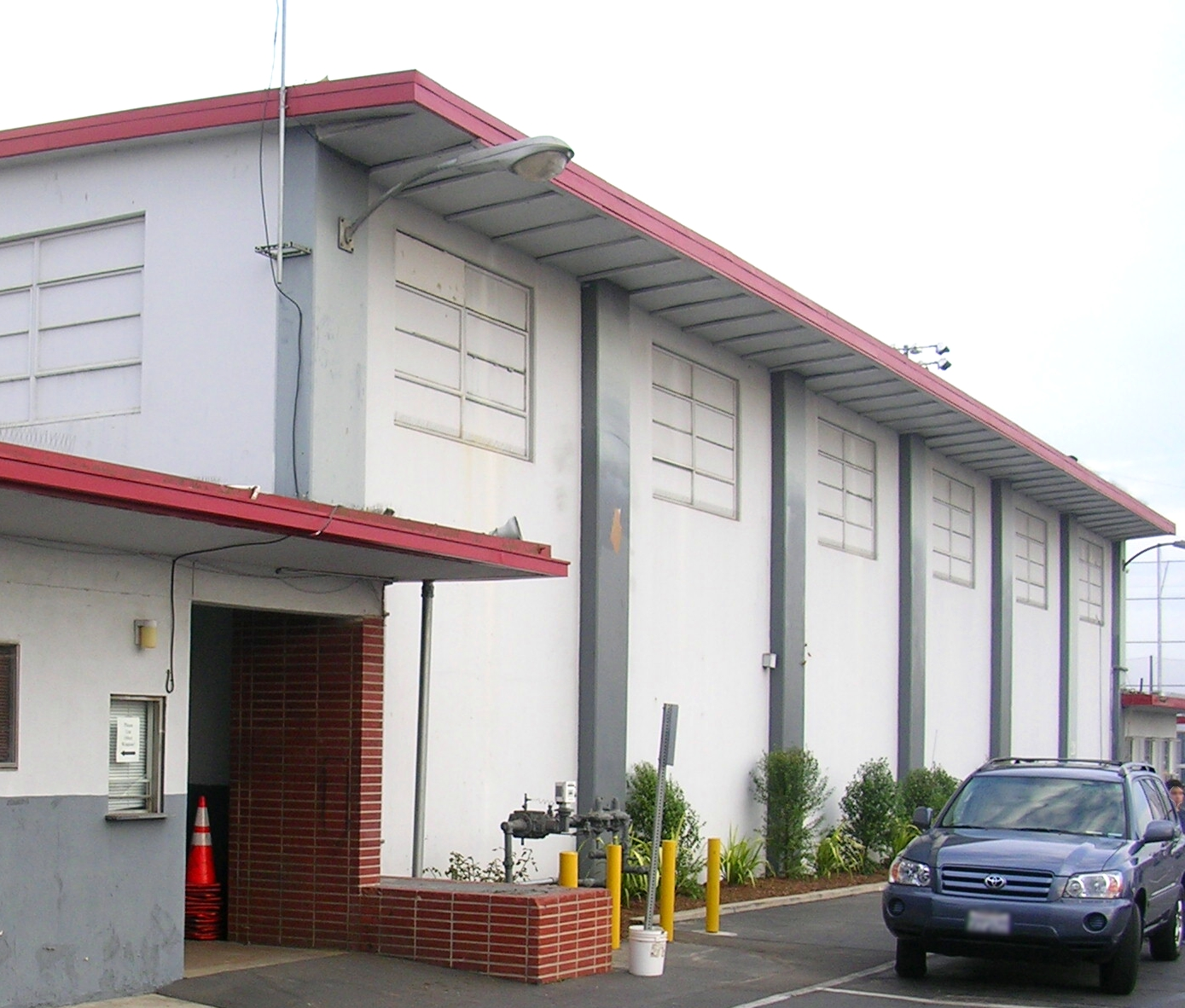
Ellis earned national recognition for his play at the Mater Dei basketball gymnasium during his high school years

Ellis excelled with the Mater Dei Monarchs and soon became one of the team's cornerstone players in the center position. He demonstrated both dominant offensive and defensive performances on the court, excellent shot blocking skills and was noted for being considerably quick and agile for his age. The Mater Dei Monarchs posted another impressive record of 30–1 during the 1985–86 season and established a 59-game winning streak (second-longest in CIF history) over the past two seasons. Their spectacular season was followed by another CIF Southern Section 5-A tournament title in March 1986, making the Monarchs back to back champions. LeRon Ellis scored a then career-high of 30 points in the tournament, was named the tournament's MVP and was selected as the Los Angeles Times' Player of the Week. However Mater Dei fell short in a close overtime game to Crenshaw High School in the CIF Division I state final game later that month.

During the 1986 summer off-season Ellis received a number of recruitment offers from the nation's top NCAA basketball programs. Ellis eventually narrowed his choices down to St. John's, Georgetown University, the University of Southern California and the University of Kentucky. Former Laker player and coach Pat Riley helped persuade Ellis to attend Kentucky on behalf of Wildcat's coach Eddie Sutton. On September 15, 1986, LeRon Ellis announced he would sign with Kentucky. Ellis was rated as one of the top 20 high school basketball players in the nation and was the star player for the number two ranked boys' high school basketball team at the start of his senior year.

LeRon Ellis began the season helping his team make it to the 1986 King Cotton Tournament finals. The Monarchs went on to play what would become one of their most fabled basketball seasons in the school's history. Ellis and company replicated their previous 30–1 record during the 19867–87 season and bagged their third straight CIF Southern Section 5-A title. Mater Dei proceeded to the state CIF State Championship tournament, ousting the top-ranked Fairfax High School in the semi-finals. The Monarchs completed their memorable season in style by defeating Ygnacio Valley High School in the finals and clinching the school's first CIF Division I state title. LeRon Ellis won a series of prestigious awards that season while averaging 22.5 points, 8.3 rebounds, and a 54% field goal shooting percentage. By the end of the season LeRon Ellis was considered to be one of the country's top high school basketball players and the Mater Dei basketball team was ranked number one in the nation by USA Today.

LeRon Ellis also displayed outstanding athletic skills off the basketball court while at Mater Dei. He returned to water polo during his senior year and led the team in scoring. Ellis was also a member of the Mater Dei track & field team and participated in the high jump and triple jump, where his 46–9.5 mark in the latter was placed in the top 25 all-time Orange County boys' track & field triple jump record. LeRon Ellis was even involved in several non-athletic school activities, including participating in several theater productions with the Mater Dei drama club and winning first prize in the school's bake-off.

== College career ==
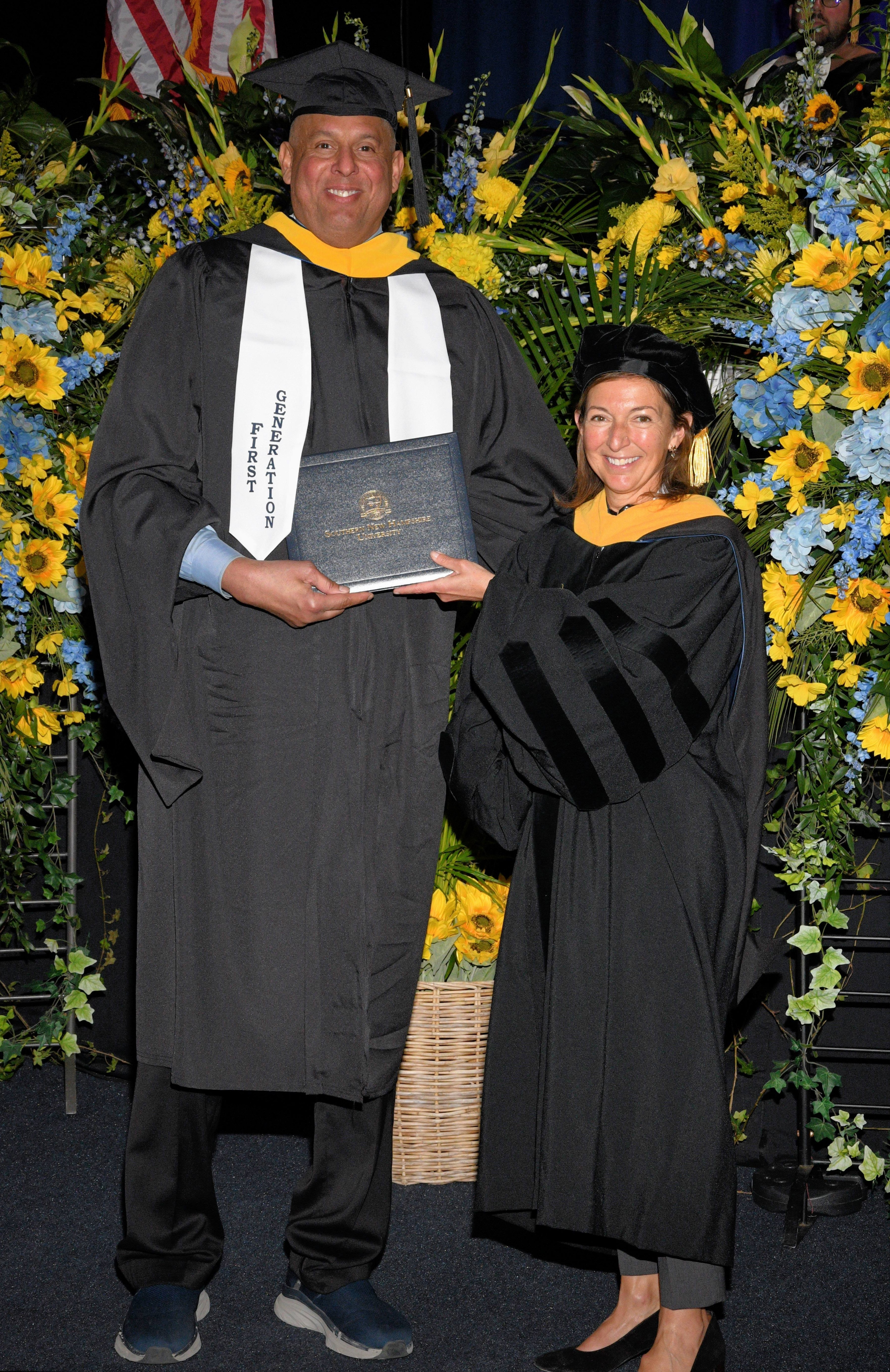
LeRon Ellis at Graduation receiving his Masters in Cybersecurity 2025

=== Southern New Hampshire University ===
LeRon obtained his BS in Cyber Security in 2021

He then obtained his MS in cyber Security in 2025

He was awarded the Distinguished Scholar award for maintaining a 4.0 GPA

== Basketball ==
=== University of Kentucky ===
Ellis spent the summer of 1987 playing in the U.S. Olympic Festival basketball games for the West team before entering the NCAA. At Kentucky he was a highly regarded incoming freshman that Wildcats head coach Eddie Sutton considered to be the next Sam Bowie. LeRon Ellis played a secondary role, mostly coming off the bench, behind center Robert Lock and power forward Winston Bennett during his freshman season. However Ellis did manage to break into the starting lineup several times, making his debut as a starter on January 31, 1988, against Notre Dame where he enjoyed a then-career high of 14 points and five steals. LeRon Ellis averaged 4.3 points per game and 13.8 minutes per game, while starting in 12 of 28 games during the 1987–88 season. All-American and All-Southeastern Conference (SEC) basketball star Rex Chapman led Kentucky that season to their 37th SEC title with a 27–6 record. The Wildcats were ranked as the 6th college basketball team in the nation by the Associated Press and UPI and secured the number two Southeast Conference seed in the 1988 NCAA Men's Division I Basketball Tournament. Kentucky's talents led the team to the tournament's Sweet Sixteen, where they suffered a defeat against Villanova.

LeRon Ellis made local headlines at the start of his sophomore year when he became the first African American inducted into the University of Kentucky's Kappa Alpha Order fraternity. Ellis was also the center of attention on the court as many of Kentucky's high-profile basketball players were unable to play in the 1988–89 season. Offensive and defensive stars Ed Davender, Robert Lock and Winston Bennett graduated from school; the Wildcats' MVP Rex Chapman left school early to enter the 1988 NBA draft; sophomore standout Eric Manuel was suspended for the entire season from playing basketball and potential franchise recruit Shawn Kemp was transferred out of the university before the start of the season. Kentucky's basketball program was essentially put into the hands of the inexperienced sophomore LeRon Ellis and freshman Chris Mills. The two underclassmen struggled to fill the talent vacuum on the court and even prior to the season many had predicted rough times ahead for the Wildcats' 1988–89 season.

Ellis led Kentucky in points that season while starting in the power forward and center positions. The talented sophomore would experience his best offensive season in his entire collegiate career, averaging a career high of 16 points per game and a 51.9% field goal percentage, including noteworthy defensive numbers with 5.5 rebounds per game as well as 1.1 blocks per game. Ellis' best single game outing (and arguably the highlight of his Kentucky tenure) was his performance against Northwestern University where he set a career-high as a Wildcat with 37 points in one game while netting 14 of 17 field goals The feat placed him in the record books then as the second most points scored by a Kentucky sophomore in a single game. The Wildcats' star was honored for his outstanding performance at the University of Kentucky's annual awards banquet where he received the "Most Points" and "Most Sacrifice" awards. However Ellis was not without his own shortcomings, being considered inconsistent on offense and weak on defense. In the end, Ellis was unable to lift Kentucky out of their battered season that was marred by poor performances on the court and an ongoing NCAA investigation into the school's basketball program off the court. The Wildcats finished with a losing record of 13–19; as of 2017, this remains the school's only losing season since 1927.

To add injury to insult, the NCAA announced at the end of the season that its investigation into the University of Kentucky's basketball program had found the school responsible of violating NCAA recruitment policies. Consequently, the Wildcats were reprimanded with a three-year probation and LeRon Ellis shortly thereafter announced that he would no longer be attending Kentucky. Ellis again was courted by some of the nation's top college basketball programs upon making his announcement. He traveled across the country visiting UCLA, the University of Nevada, Las Vegas (UNLV) and Syracuse University during the 1989 summer. Ellis was keenly interested in transferring to UNLV but had a sudden change of heart after discovering that their basketball program was under NCAA investigation and could possibly face sanctions similar to the University of Kentucky. Though unaware at the time, LeRon Ellis could have potentially been a member of the 1990 UNLV Runnin' Rebels NCAA Men's Division I Basketball Championship team had he decided to enroll at UNLV in 1989. LeRon Ellis eventually announced on July 17, 1989, that he would transfer to Syracuse. Ellis was allowed to play in the upcoming 1989–90 season and would not have to sit out a season as a redshirt transfer because the University of Kentucky was placed on probation.

== Professional basketball career ==
LeRon Ellis played his final two college seasons at Syracuse University. He was selected 22nd overall in the 1991 NBA draft by the Los Angeles Clippers and went on to play three NBA seasons for the Clippers, Charlotte Hornets and Miami Heat. His best year as a pro came during the 1993–94 season as a member of the Hornets, when he appeared in 50 games and averaged 4.4 ppg.

== Awards and achievements ==
- CIF Southern Section 5-A Tournament MVP (1986)
- Los Angeles Times Player of the Week (March 10–16, 1986)
- Cal-Hi Sports All-State Basketball Team (1986)
- Street & Smith's Preseason All-American Second Team (1986)
- King Cotton All-Tournament Team (1987)
- Angelus League MVP (1987)
- Dapper Dan Roundball Classic: U.S. West (1987)
- CIF Southern Section 5-A Player of the Year (1987)
- Gatorade Player of the Year: Pacific Region (1987)
- Los Angeles Times' All-County Basketball Team (1987)
- Orange County Register's All-County Team (1987)
- Circle of Champions Pacific Regional Player of the Year (1987)
- Hoop Scoop Senior Class of 1987 First Team
- Los Angeles Times' Player of the Year (1987)
- Basketball Weekly All-American Third Team (1987)
- USA Today's All-USA High School Basketball Team (1987)
- Parade Magazine All-American First Team (1987)
- McDonald's Derby Festival Classic (1987)
- Cal-Hi Player of the Year (1987)
- Orange County Athletic Directors Association Athlete of the Year (1987)
- Amateur Athletic Foundation Top Prep Boy's Athlete (1987)
- U.S. Olympic Festival West Team (1987)
- R. William Jones Cup U.S. Team (1988)
- The United Press International All-SEC Second Team (1989)

== See also ==
- List of second-generation NBA players
