= Jiayin County =

Jiayin 嘉荫县
- County
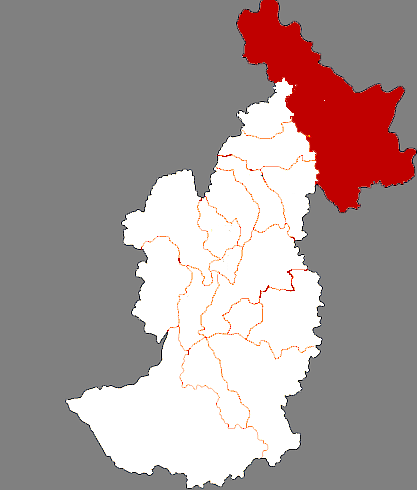

- Location in Heilongjiang
- Coordinates: 48°42′N 130°06′E
- Country: People's Republic of China
- Province: Heilongjiang
- Prefecture-level city: Yichun

Area
  - Total: 7,273 km^{2} (2,808 sq mi)
- Elevation: 88 m (289 ft)

Population (2010)
  - Total: 68,579
  - Density: 9.429/km^{2} (24.42/sq mi)
- Time zone: UTC+8 (China Standard)

Jiayin County (simplified Chinese: 嘉荫县; traditional Chinese: 嘉蔭縣; pinyin: Jiāyīn Xiàn) is a county in Heilongjiang Province, China, bordering Russia's Amur Oblast and Jewish Autonomous Oblast. It is under the administration of the prefecture-level city of Yichun and the county seat is Chaoyang Town (朝阳镇) situated on the southern (right) bank of the Amur River.

== Administrative divisions ==
Jiayin County is divided into 4 towns and 5 townships.

4 towns

- Chaoyang (朝阳镇), Wuyun (乌云镇), Wulaga (乌拉嘎镇), Baoxing (保兴镇)

5 townships

- Changsheng (常胜乡), Xiangyang (向阳乡), Hujia (沪嘉乡), Hongguang (红光乡), Qingshan (青山乡)

== Demographics ==
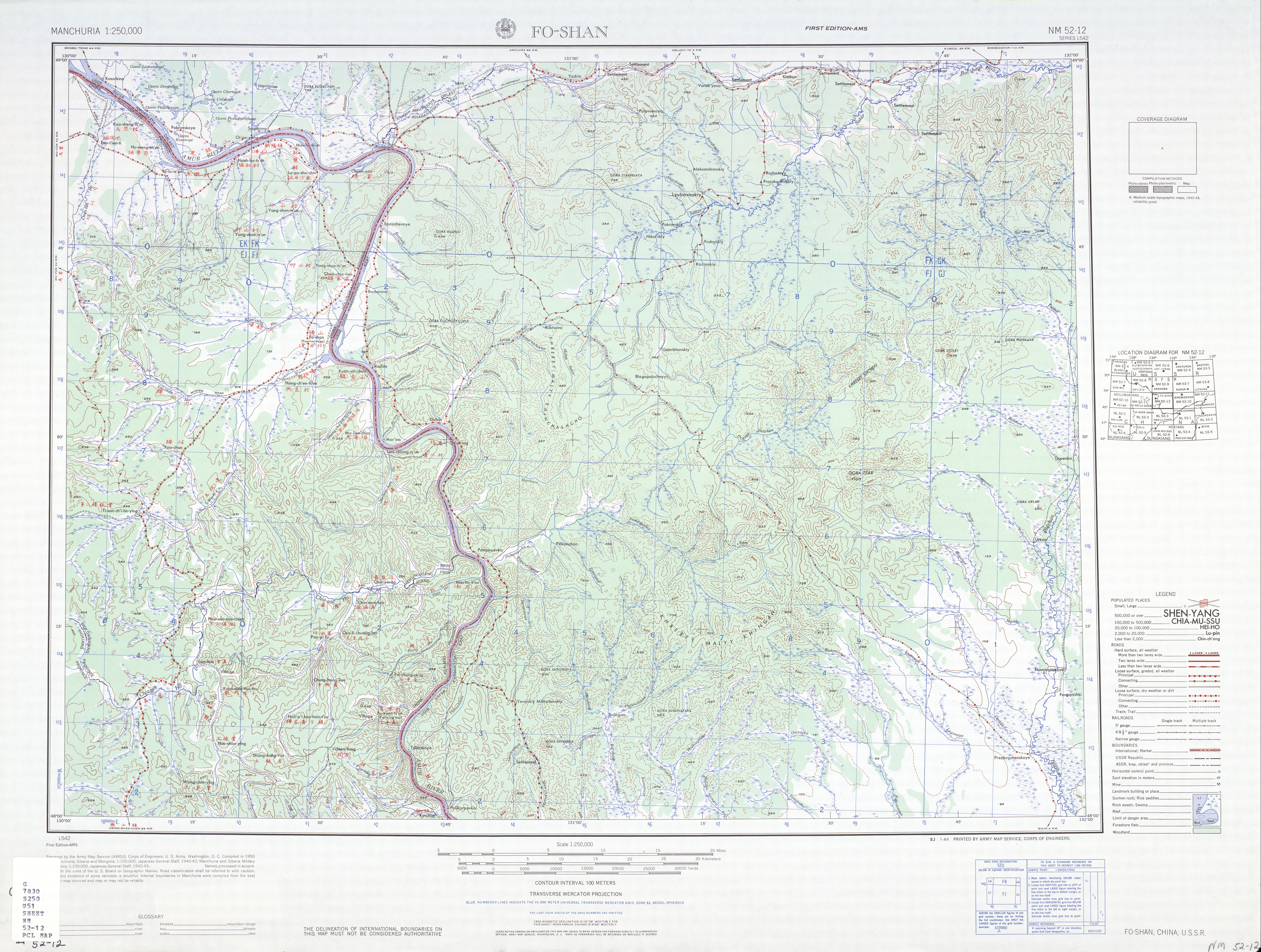
Foshan (labelled as Fo-shan (Pao-nan-ts'un) 佛山 (寶南村)) (1950)

The population of the district was 77,929 in 1999.

== Climate ==
Climate data for Jiayin, elevation 90 m (300 ft), (1991–2020 normals, extremes 1981–present)
Month	Jan	Feb	Mar	Apr	May	Jun	Jul	Aug	Sep	Oct	Nov	Dec	Year
Record high °C (°F)	−3.5 (25.7)	5.9 (42.6)	20.0 (68.0)	31.6 (88.9)	34.4 (93.9)	38.7 (101.7)	37.7 (99.9)	34.8 (94.6)	31.8 (89.2)	27.7 (81.9)	14.6 (58.3)	2.0 (35.6)	38.7 (101.7)
Mean daily maximum °C (°F)	−17.8 (0.0)	−11.2 (11.8)	−1.0 (30.2)	11.2 (52.2)	19.8 (67.6)	24.7 (76.5)	27.3 (81.1)	25.3 (77.5)	19.6 (67.3)	9.8 (49.6)	−4.5 (23.9)	−16.4 (2.5)	7.2 (45.0)
Daily mean °C (°F)	−25.0 (−13.0)	−19.4 (−2.9)	−7.8 (18.0)	4.9 (40.8)	13.1 (55.6)	18.6 (65.5)	21.9 (71.4)	19.8 (67.6)	13.1 (55.6)	3.7 (38.7)	−10.0 (14.0)	−22.5 (−8.5)	0.9 (33.6)
Mean daily minimum °C (°F)	−30.8 (−23.4)	−26.9 (−16.4)	−15.1 (4.8)	−1.5 (29.3)	6.2 (43.2)	12.7 (54.9)	16.9 (62.4)	15.0 (59.0)	7.5 (45.5)	−1.9 (28.6)	−15.2 (4.6)	−27.9 (−18.2)	−5.1 (22.9)
Record low °C (°F)	−43.7 (−46.7)	−44.2 (−47.6)	−35.3 (−31.5)	−18.3 (−0.9)	−5.1 (22.8)	3.0 (37.4)	7.7 (45.9)	4.6 (40.3)	−5.9 (21.4)	−17.5 (0.5)	−37.2 (−35.0)	−44.4 (−47.9)	−44.4 (−47.9)
Average precipitation mm (inches)	7.3 (0.29)	6.6 (0.26)	12.9 (0.51)	26.2 (1.03)	63.4 (2.50)	98.6 (3.88)	143.2 (5.64)	120.6 (4.75)	69.4 (2.73)	32.0 (1.26)	15.3 (0.60)	12.3 (0.48)	607.8 (23.93)
Average precipitation days (≥ 0.1 mm)	8.9	5.8	6.5	8.2	12.8	14.7	14.4	14.7	11.8	9.0	9.0	10.7	126.5
Average snowy days	11.2	7.6	8.0	4.4	0.1	0	0	0	0.1	4.3	11.0	13.0	59.7
Average relative humidity (%)	73	70	65	57	60	73	78	81	75	65	70	74	70
Mean monthly sunshine hours	162.5	199.4	250.1	238.4	247.0	247.2	238.6	229.9	210.0	182.5	151.1	143.5	2,500.2
Percentage possible sunshine	60	69	68	58	52	51	49	52	56	55	56	56	57
Source: China Meteorological Administration all-time extreme temperature
