= Stephen C. Harrison =

American chemist and pharmacologist

Stephen Harrison
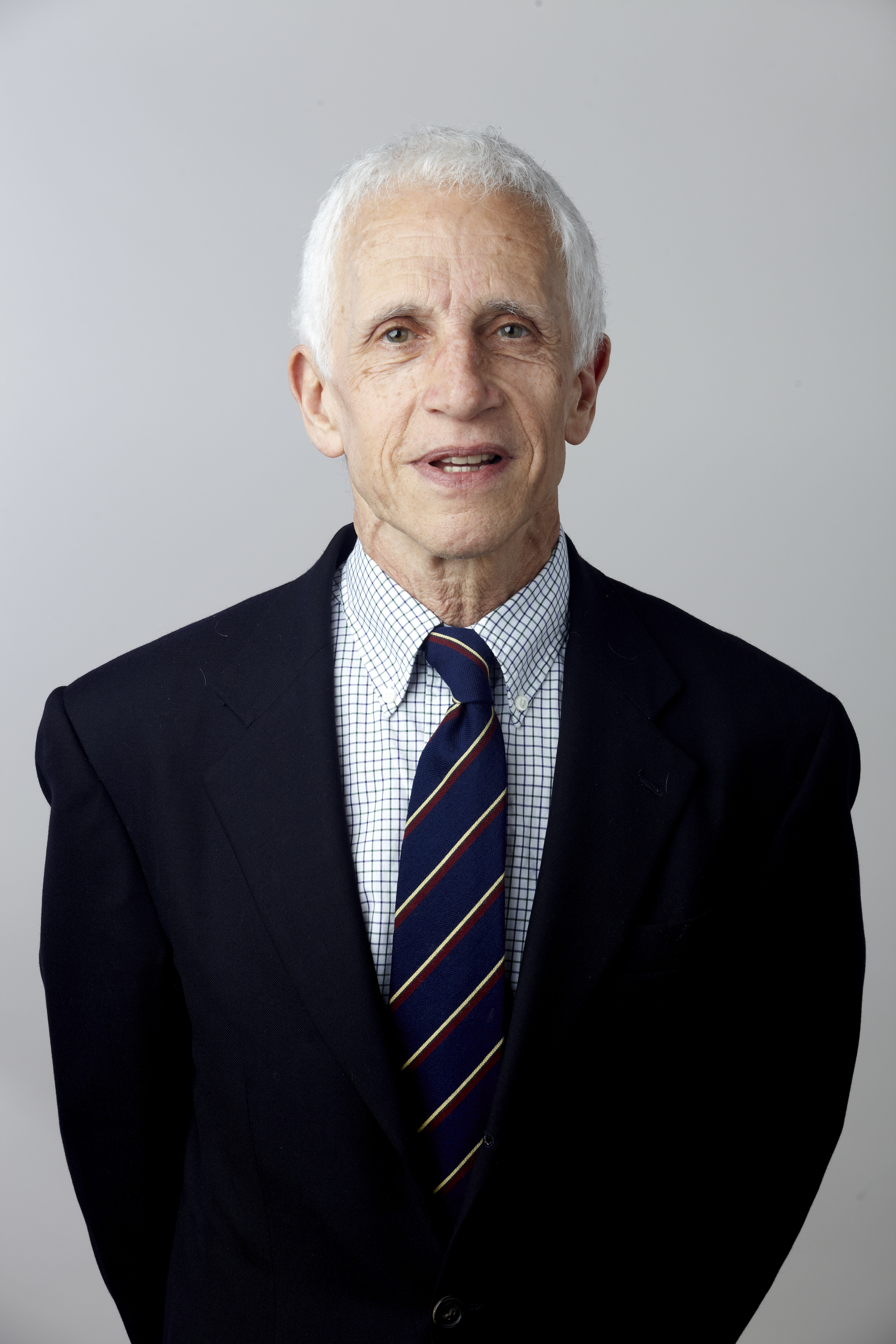
- Stephen Harrison in 2014, portrait via the Royal Society
- Education: Harvard University (BA, PhD)
- Spouse: Tomas Kirchhausen
- Scientific career
- Notable students: Xiaojiang Chen
- Website: crystal.harvard.edu

Stephen C. Harrison is professor of biological chemistry and molecular pharmacology, professor of pediatrics, and director of the Center for Molecular and Cellular Dynamics of Harvard Medical School, head of the Laboratory of Molecular Medicine at Boston Children's Hospital, and investigator of the Howard Hughes Medical Institute.

== Education and career ==
He received his B.A. in chemistry and physics from Harvard in 1963, and was then a Henry fellow at the MRC Laboratory of Molecular Biology at Cambridge. In 1967, he received his Ph.D. in biophysics from Harvard, was a research fellow there as well as a junior fellow in the Society of Fellows, and joined the Harvard faculty in 1971.

== Research ==
His wide-ranging studies of protein structure have contributed insights to viral architecture, DNA–protein recognition, and cellular signaling.

Harrison has made important contributions to structural biology, most notably by determining and analyzing the structures of viruses and viral proteins, by crystallographic analysis of protein–DNA complexes, and by structural studies of protein-kinase switching mechanisms. The initiator of high-resolution virus crystallography, he has moved from his early work on tomato bushy stunt virus (1978) to the study of more complex human pathogens, including the capsid of human papillomavirus, the envelope of dengue virus, and several components of HIV. He has also turned some of his research attention to even more complex assemblies, such as clathrin-coated vesicles. He led the Structural Biology team at the Center for HIV/AIDS Vaccine Immunology (CHAVI) when it received National Institute of Allergy and Infectious Diseases (NIAID) funding of around $300 million to address key immunological roadblocks to HIV vaccine development and to design, develop and test novel HIV vaccine candidates.

== Society memberships ==
He is a member of American Academy of Arts and Sciences, National Academy of Sciences, American Philosophical Society, European Molecular Biology Organization, American Crystallographic Association and American Association for the Advancement of Science.

== Awards ==
- 1982 Ledlie Prize, Harvard University
- 1988 Wallace P. Rowe Award, National Institute of Allergy and Infectious Diseases
- 1990 Louisa Gross Horwitz Prize (with Don Wiley and Michael Rossmann), Columbia University
- 1990 Harvey Lecturer, The Harvey Society, New York
- 1995 George Ledlie Prize, Harvard University
- 1997 ICN International Prize in Virology
- 2001 Paul Ehrlich and Ludwig Darmstaedter Prize (with Michael Rossmann)
- 2005 Bristol-Myers Squibb Award for Distinguished Achievement in Infectious Diseases Research
- 2006 Gregori Aminoff Prize in Crystallography (with David Stuart)
- 2007 UCSD/Merck Life Sciences Achievement Award
- 2011 William Silen Lifetime Achievement in Mentoring Award, Harvard Medical School
- 2012 Pauling Lectureship, Stanford University
- 2014 Elected as a Foreign Member of the Royal Society of London.
- 2015 The Welch Award in Chemistry
- 2015 Honorary Doctorate in Medicine, University of Milan
- 2018 48th Rosenstiel Award for research on proteins and viruses.

== Personal life ==
Harrison has been married to Tomas Kirchhausen, who is currently a Professor at Harvard Medical School, since 2013. They first met in 1978 at a small dinner hosted by Ada Yonath. In the fall of 1979, Tom moved to Cambridge, MA, to work with Harrison, and the two have been in a relationship ever since.
