= Xiangyang Township, Jiayin County =

Xiangyang Township 向阳乡
- Township
- Location in Heilongjiang Xiangyang Township (China)
- Coordinates: 49°10′47″N 129°45′36″E
- Country: People's Republic of China
- Province: Heilongjiang
- Prefecture-level city: Yichun
- County: Jiayin County
- Time zone: UTC+8 (China Standard)

Xiangyang Township (simplified Chinese: 向阳乡; traditional Chinese: 向陽鄉; pinyin: Xiàngyáng Xiāng) is a township under the administration of Jiayin County, Heilongjiang, China. As of 2018, it has 11 villages under its administration.
