= Tomoya Higashino =

Japanese basketball player and coach

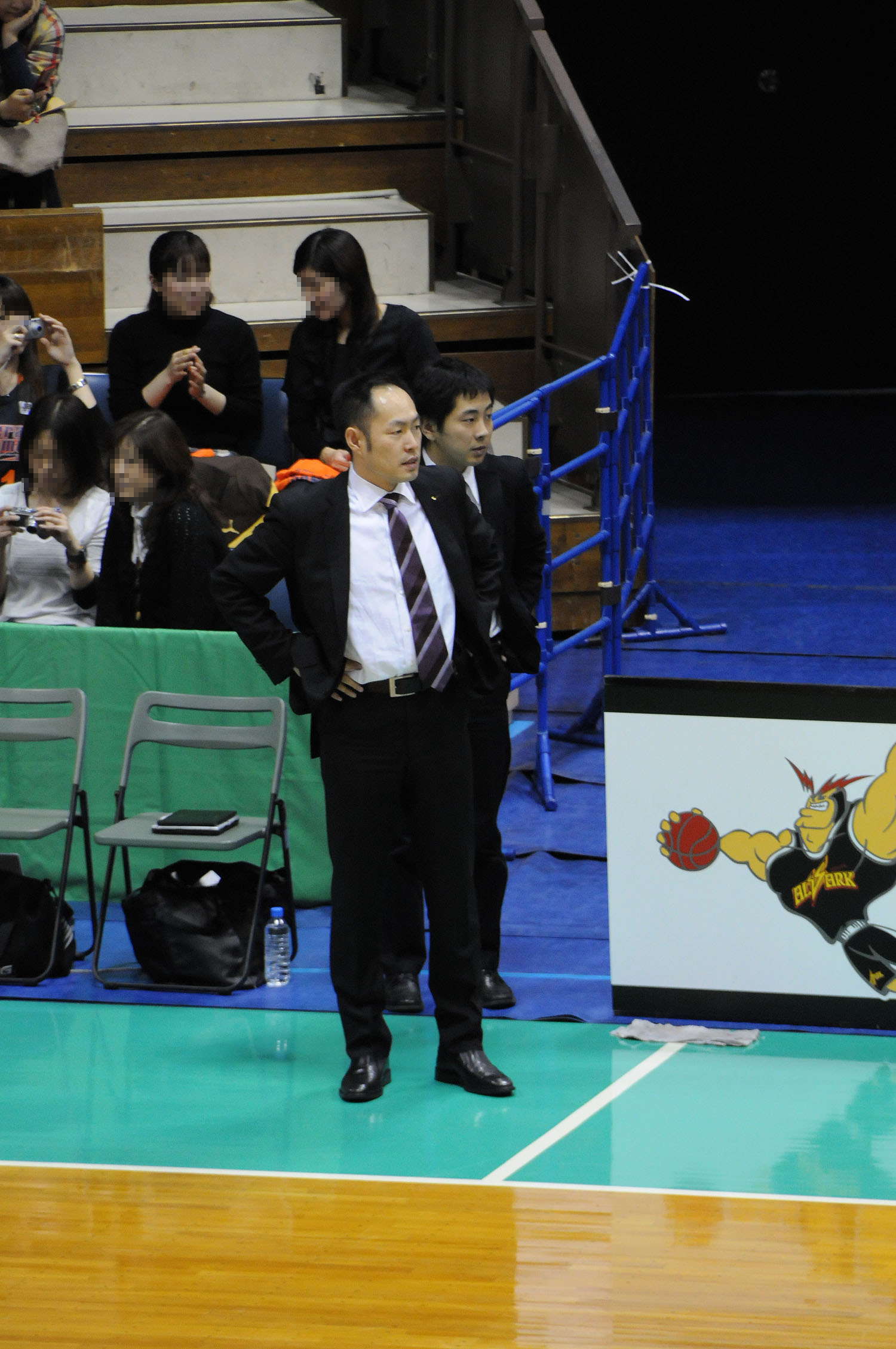

Japan Basketball Association
- Position: Technical committee

Personal information
- Born: September 9, 1970 (age 56) Kaga, Ishikawa

Career information
- High school: Hokuriku (Fukui, Fukui)
- College: Waseda University
- Playing career: 1993–1995

Career history

Playing
- 1993-1995: Ẽfini Tokyo

Coaching
- 1996-1998: Lewis & Clark College (asst)
- 1998-1999: Mitsui Falcons (asst)
- 1999-2001: Tokorozawa Broncos
- 2001-2004: Toyota Alvark (asst)
- 2004-2006: Japan (asst)
- 2007-2010: Rera Kamuy Hokkaido
- 2010-2012: Japan (asst)
- 2013-2016: Hamamatsu Higashimikawa Phoenix

Career highlights

Tomoya Higashino (東野智弥, Higashino Tomoya) is the former Head coach of the Hamamatsu Higashimikawa Phoenix in the Japanese Bj League.

== Head coaching record ==
Legend
Regular season	G	Games coached	W	Games won	L	Games lost	W–L %	Win–loss %
Playoffs	PG	Playoff games	PW	Playoff wins	PL	Playoff losses	PW–L %	Playoff win–loss %

Team	Year	G	W	L	W–L%	Finish	PG	PW	PL	PW–L%	Result
Tokorozawa Broncos	1999	-	-	-	–	3rd	-	-	-	–	-
Tokorozawa Broncos	2000	-	-	-	–	3rd	-	-	-	–	-
Tokorozawa Broncos	2001	-	-	-	–	3rd	-	-	-	–	-
Rera Kamuy Hokkaido	2007-08	35	8	27	.229	8th	-	-	-	–	-
Rera Kamuy Hokkaido	2008-09	35	14	21	.400	7th	-	-	-	–	-
Rera Kamuy Hokkaido	2009-10	42	12	30	.286	7th	-	-	-	–	-
Hamamatsu Higashimikawa Phoenix	2013	14	5	9	.357	6th in Western	2	0	2	.000	Lost in 1st round
Hamamatsu Higashimikawa Phoenix	2013-14	52	27	25	.519	4th in Western	5	2	3	.400	Lost in 2nd round
Hamamatsu Higashimikawa Phoenix	2014-15	52	41	11	.788	3rd in Western	6	6	0	1.000	Bj Champions
Hamamatsu Higashimikawa Phoenix	2015-16	52	36	16	.692	4th in Western	2	0	2	.000	Lost in 1st round
