= Higashino Station =

Higashino Station may refer to:

- Higashino Station (Kyoto) on the Tozai Line of Kyoto Municipal Subway
- Higashino Station (Gifu) on the Akechi Railway
