= Xiangyang, Ziyang County =

Xiangyang 向阳镇
- Town
- Location in China
- Coordinates: 32°30′3″N 108°28′7″E
- Country: People's Republic of China
- Province: Shaanxi
- Prefecture-level city: Ankang
- County: Ziyang County
- Time zone: UTC+8 (China Standard)

Xiangyang (Chinese: 向阳) is a town of Ziyang County, Shaanxi, China. As of 2018, it has one residential community and 12 villages under its administration.
