= 152nd Regiment =

152nd Regiment may refer to:

- 152nd Infantry Regiment "Sassari", a unit of the Italian Army since 1915
- 152nd Infantry Regiment (France), a unit of the 7th Armoured Brigade (France)
- 152 (North Irish) Regiment RLC, a unit of the United Kingdom Territorial Army
- 152nd Punjabis, a British Indian Army regiment serving in Palestine, 1918-1921
- 152nd Illinois Infantry Regiment, a unit of the Union (North) Army during the American Civil War
- 152nd New York Infantry Regiment, a unit of the Union (North) Army during the American Civil War
- 152nd Ohio Infantry Regiment, a unit of the Union (North) Army during the American Civil War
- 152nd Infantry Regiment (United States), a regiment of the Indiana Army National Guard
- 152nd Tank Regiment, a component of the Russian Ground Forces' 27th Guards Rifle Division at Totskoye in the Volga-Urals Military District
- 152nd Regiment (XPCC), a unit of the Xinjiang Production and Construction Corps, China
