= 152nd Division (People's Republic of China) =

152nd Division (1948–1952) 1st Forestry Engineering Division (1952)
- Active: 1948.11 - 1952.8
- Country: People's Republic of China
- Branch: People's Liberation Army
- Type: Division
- Role: Infantry
- Part of: 39th Corps
- Engagements: Chinese Civil War

The 152nd Division (Chinese: 第152师) was created in November 1948 under the Regulation of the Redesignations of All Organizations and Units of the Army, issued by Central Military Commission on November 1, 1948, basing on the 7th Independent Division of the Northeastern Field Army, formed in January 1948.

The division was a part of PLA 39th Corps, under which command it took part in the Chinese Civil War.

In August 1952 the division was re-organized as 1st Forestry Engineering Division((Chinese: 林业工程第1师), moving to Hainan for rubber plantation. In October the division was demobilized and became Hainan States Farms, now one of the biggest rubber production enterprise in the world.

As of its re-organization the division was composed of:

- 454th Regiment;
- 455th Regiment;
- 456th Regiment.
