= Xiangyang, Xiangfang District =

Xiangyang 向阳镇
- Town
- Location in Heilongjiang
- Coordinates: 45°47′8″N 126°55′9″E
- Country: People's Republic of China
- Province: Heilongjiang
- Prefecture-level city: Harbin
- District: Xiangfang District
- Time zone: UTC+8 (China Standard)

Xiangyang (Chinese: 向阳) is a town of Xiangfang District, Harbin, Heilongjiang, China. As of 2018, it has one residential community and 8 villages under its administration.
