= Xiangyang Subdistrict, Chaoyang =

Xiangyang Subdistrict 向阳街道
- Subdistrict
- Location in Liaoning
- Coordinates: 41°36′17″N 120°20′55″E
- Country: People's Republic of China
- Province: Liaoning
- Prefecture-level city: Chaoyang
- District: Longcheng District
- Time zone: UTC+8 (China Standard)

Xiangyang Subdistrict (Chinese: 向阳街道; pinyin: Xiàngyáng Jiēdào) is a subdistrict in Longcheng District, Chaoyang, Liaoning, China. As of 2018, it has 4 residential communities under its administration.

== See also ==
- List of township-level divisions of Liaoning
