= Xiangyang Subdistrict, Xuancheng =

Xiangyang Subdistrict 向阳街道
- Subdistrict
- Location in China
- Coordinates: 30°53′36″N 118°51′52″E
- Country: People's Republic of China
- Province: Anhui
- Prefecture-level city: Xuancheng
- District: Xuanzhou District
- Time zone: UTC+8 (China Standard)

Xiangyang Subdistrict (Chinese: 向阳街道; pinyin: Xiàngyáng Jiēdào) is a subdistrict in Xuanzhou District, Xuancheng, Anhui, China. As of 2018, it has 3 residential communities and 5 villages under its administration.

== See also ==
- List of township-level divisions of Anhui
