= Xiangyang Township, Sichuan =

Xiangyang Township 向阳乡
- Township
- Location in Sichuan
- Coordinates: 27°25′53″N 102°32′4″E
- Country: People's Republic of China
- Province: Sichuan
- Autonomous prefecture: Liangshan Yi Autonomous Prefecture
- County: Puge County
- Time zone: UTC+8 (China Standard)

Xiangyang Township (simplified Chinese: 向阳乡; traditional Chinese: 向陽鄉; pinyin: Xiàngyáng Xiāng) was a former township under the administration of Puge County, Sichuan, China. As of 2018, it had five villages under its administration.
