= Xiangyang Subdistrict, Shihezi =

Xiangyang Subdistrict 向阳街道
- Subdistrict
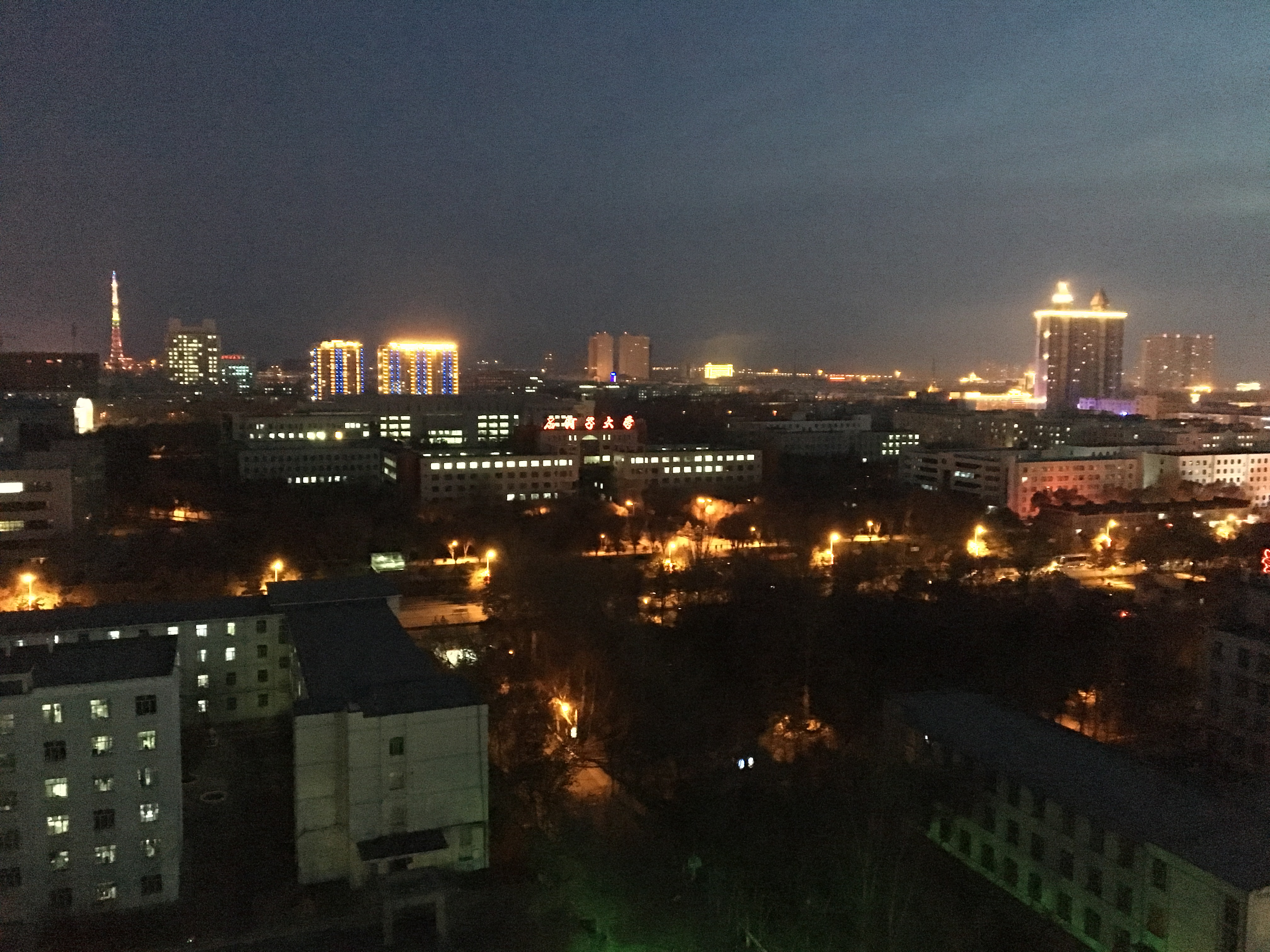

- Location in Xinjiang
- Coordinates: 44.3071°N 86.0532°E
- Country: People's Republic of China
- Autonomous region: Xinjiang
- County-level city: Shihezi
- Time zone: UTC+8 (China Standard)

Xiangyang Subdistrict (Chinese: 向阳街道; pinyin: Xiàngyáng Jiēdào) is a subdistrict in Shihezi, Xinjiang, China. As of 2018, it has 10 residential communities under its administration.

== See also ==
- List of township-level divisions of Xinjiang
