= 152nd Illinois Infantry Regiment =

152nd Regiment Illinois Volunteer Infantry
- Illinois state flag
- Active: February 28, 1865, to September 9, 1865
- Country: United States
- Allegiance: Union
- Branch: Infantry

The 152nd Regiment Illinois Volunteer Infantry was an infantry regiment that served in the Union Army during the American Civil War.

== Service ==
The 152nd Illinois Infantry was organized at Camp Butler, Illinois, and mustered into Federal service on February 28, 1865, for a one-year enlistment. The 152nd garrisoned the line of the Nashville and Chattanooga Railroad and later Memphis, Tennessee.

The regiment mustered out September 9, 1865.

== Total strength and casualties ==
The regiment suffered 76 enlisted men who died of disease for a total of 76 fatalities.

== Commanders ==
- Colonel Ferdinand D. Stephenson - mustered out with the regiment.

== See also ==
- List of Illinois Civil War Units
- Illinois in the American Civil War
