= Xiangyang, Guanghan =

Xiangyang 向阳镇
- Town
- Location in Sichuan
- Coordinates: 30°54′29″N 104°13′17″E
- Country: People's Republic of China
- Province: Sichuan
- Prefecture-level city: Deyang
- County-level city: Guanghan
- Time zone: UTC+8 (China Standard)

Xiangyang (Chinese: 向阳) is a town of Guanghan, Sichuan, China. As of 2018, it has two residential communities and 15 villages under its administration.
