= Shihezi University =

Public university in Shihezi, Xinjiang, China

- 石河子大学
- Type: Public
- Established: 1996; 30 years ago
- Affiliations: Xinjiang Production and Construction Corps
- Academic affiliations: Double First-Class Construction; Project 211
- Faculty: 2,600 (April 2022)
- Undergraduates: 41,000 (April 2022)
- Postgraduates: 6,482 (April 2022)
- Location: Shihezi, Xinjiang, China; 44°18′24″N 86°03′16″E
- Campus: 180.2 ha (445 acres); Urban
- Website: www.shzuni.com

Shihezi University

Chinese name
- Simplified Chinese: 石河子大学
- Traditional Chinese: 石河子大學
Transcriptions
Standard Mandarin
- Hanyu Pinyin: Shíhézǐ Dàxué

Uyghur name
- Uyghur: شىخەنزە ئۇنىۋېرسىتېتى
Transcriptions
- Latin Yëziqi: Shixenze univërsitëti
- Yengi Yeziⱪ: Xihənzə universiteti
- Siril Yëziqi: Шихəнзə универсиtеtи

Shihezi University (SHZU) is a public university in Shihezi, Xinjiang, China. Founded in 1996, it is affiliated with the Xinjiang Production and Construction Corps, and co-funded by the Ministry of Education and the Corps. The university is part of Project 211 and the Double First-Class Construction.

== History ==
Shihezi University was officially formed in September 1996 with the merge of Shihezi Medical College (est. 1949), Shihezi Agricultural College (est. 1959), XPCC Vocational College of Economics (est. 1959), and XPCC Vocational College of Education (est. 1960).

== Academics ==
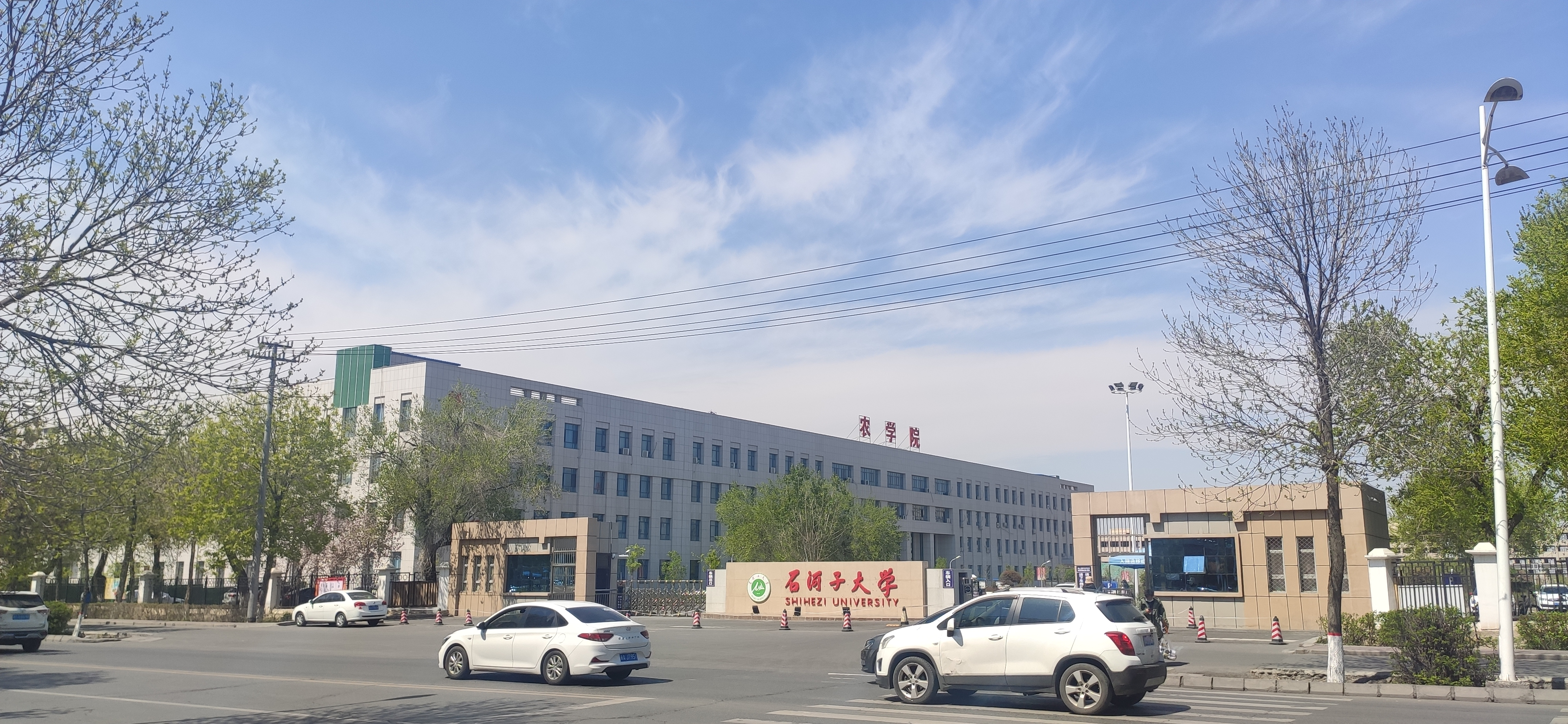
Gate of Shihezi University

Shihezi University offers 10 specialties—Agriculture, Medicine, Engineering, Economics and Trade, Management, Literature and Arts, Sciences, Education, Law, and History. It has 23 colleges, offering 10 doctorate degrees, 60 master's degrees, 97 bachelor's degrees, 1 pre-university senior middle school program, five specialties that enroll on-job-teachers for master's degrees, two post-doctoral scientific work stations, four post-doctoral mobile stations. The university has jointly set up graduate education bases with Peking University and Tianjin University, as well as a program for culture-oriented quality education.

The university has 11 disciplines: Ministry of Agriculture, Xinjiang Uygur Autonomous Region (XUAR) and the Xinjiang Production and Construction Corps (XPCC), three key laboratories co-constructed and supported by the Ministry of Education, the Ministry of Science and Technology, and the XPCC. It has two key laboratories of XPCC, two key bases for art and scientific research, and 24 graduate schools and research centers. The university has become a key scientific research base of XPCC and XUAR.

=== Rankings and reputation ===
The Best Chinese Universities Ranking, also known as the "Shanghai Ranking", placed the university 138th in China and the 2nd best university in Xinjiang after Xinjiang University.

It was ranked 901-1000th globally by the Academic Ranking of World Universities (ARWU).

Ranking lists	Years	National	Asia	Global
Wu shulian Rankings	2022	162		
CUAA Rankings	2022	167		
ARWU	2023	138		901-1000
CWUR	2023	216		1385
SCImago Institutions Rankings	2022	157	322	623
CWTS Leiden Ranking	2023	185	343	839
USNWR	2022-2023	293	755	1880

== Faculty and students ==
The university has 2,600 staff. There are 1,894 full-time teachers including two academicians of the Chinese Academy of Engineering, 355 professors, 706 associate professors, 58 experts and scholars receiving outstanding achievement awards at national and provincial level, and 81 distinguished experts and scholars receiving special subsidies from the government. It employs more than 10 foreign experts and teachers every year.

Students come from 31 provinces and regions. The student population is currently 41,000, including 22,462 undergraduates, 6482 postgraduates and 415 international students from countries such as the United States, India, Russia, Pakistan, Bangladesh, Kazakhstan, Afghanistan, etc.

== Campus ==
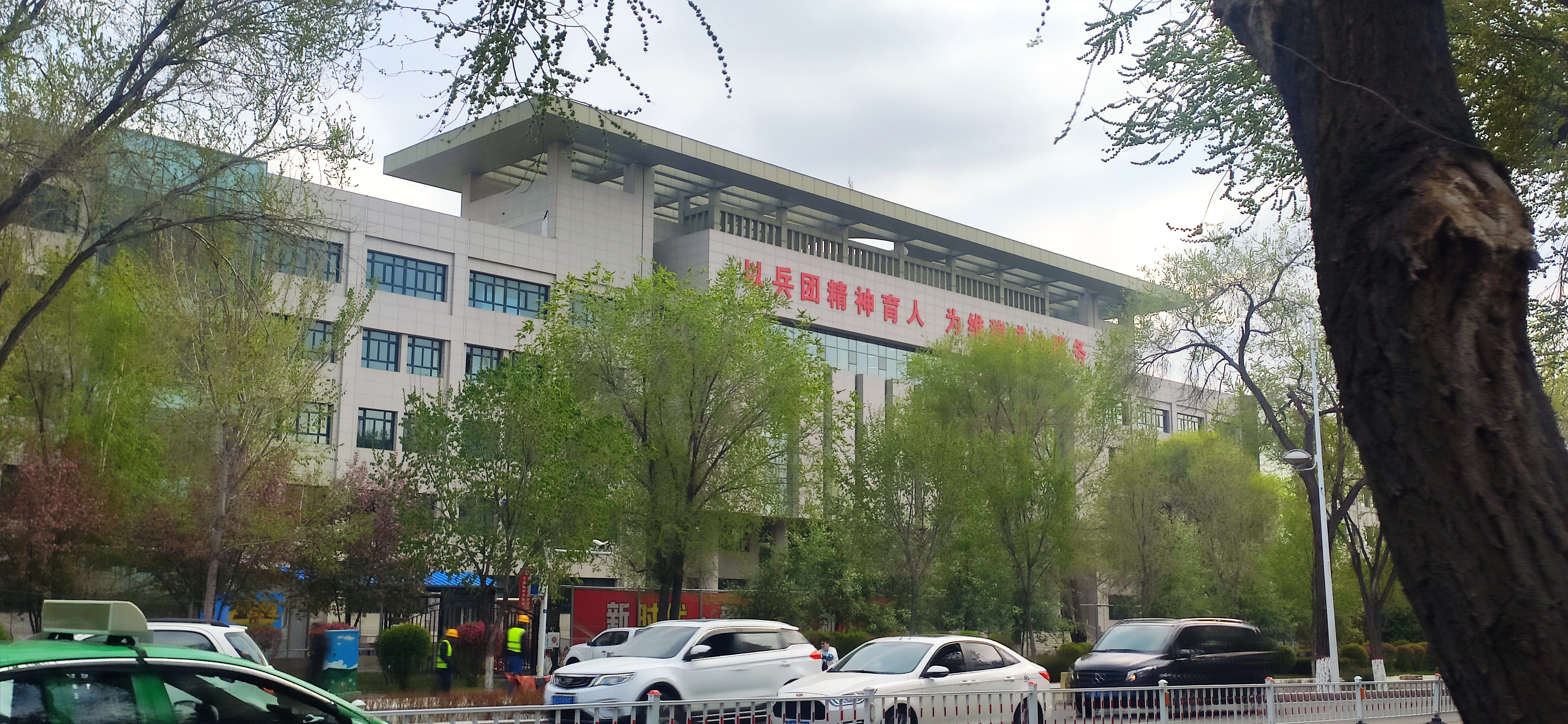
Street view by the campus

The campus covers 1,802,000 square meters. It has 1,214,000 square meters of building, and the area of its laboratories is 184,100 square meters. The library has a collection of 3,000,000 Chinese and foreign books and periodicals, and is only one model project in Xinjiang, as university digital libraries in State High-tech Project 863. It has a book collection spot of the UN's Food and Agriculture Organization (FAO).

== Location ==
The university is located in Shihezi, the Garden City, by the river of Manas on the northern foot of the Tianshan Mountains in Xinjiang.
