= Tower Cancer Research Foundation =

US non-profit organization

- Company type: Research Institute
- Industry: Cancer research
- Founded: 1996, Beverly Hills, California, United States
- Headquarters: Beverly Hills, California, United States
- Key people: Board of Directors; Abby Levy, Chairman
- Revenue: 2,600,255 United States dollar (2016)
- Total assets: 4,621,629 United States dollar (2022)
- Website: www.towercancer.org

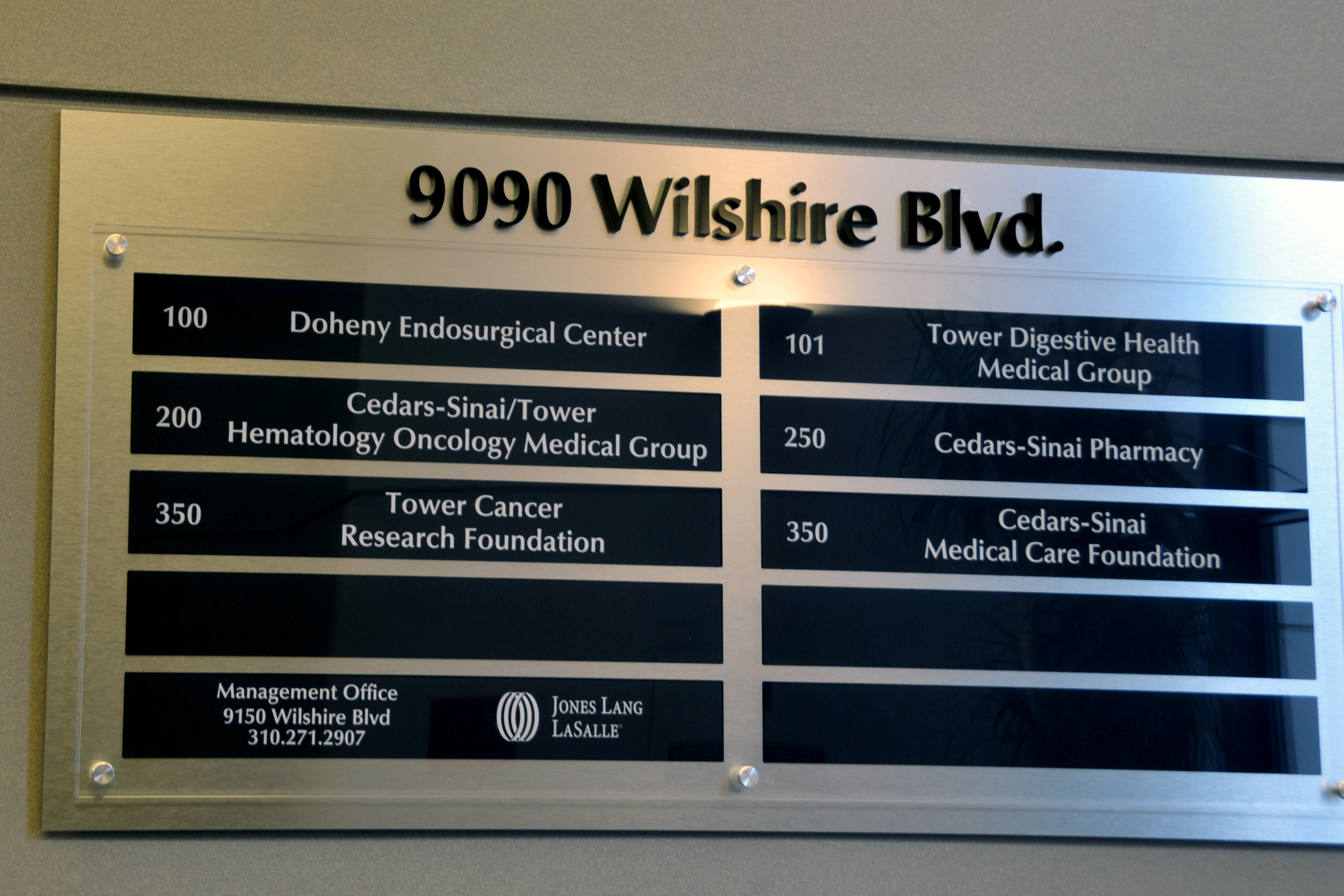
Sign of the Tower Cancer Research Foundation

Tower Cancer Research Foundation (TCRF) is a 501(c)(3) non-profit organization dedicated to clinical research, patient support and community education. It was established in 1996 in Beverly Hills, California.

Focused mainly on performing clinical trials for the development of new and more effective treatments of cancer and blood disorders, TCRF has conducted over 400 clinical trials since its inception in 1996 and has awarded $1.2 million in funds in scientific laboratory research grants to physicians. In addition to its clinical research program, TCRF provides patient support services and programs.

TCRF also provides treatment for genetic disorders such as Gaucher disease and Pompe disease and have a Gaucher program.

== Clinical trial research - the Frank E. Rosenfelt Drug Development Program ==
TCRF's research program, the Frank E. Rosenfelt Drug Development Program, is named for the entertainment attorney Frank Rosenfelt, whose family had a commitment to cancer research and made significant philanthropic contributions to TCRF to establish and continue its work.

=== Clinical research publications ===
TCRF has had its clinical research acknowledged in several major medical journals including, Blood, Clinical Cancer Research, Journal of Immunotherapy, Interact Cardiovasc Thoracic Surgery, Genetics in Medicine, Lancet, Haematologica, Journal of Clinical Oncology, Clinical Genetics, and Seminars in Hematology.

== Fellowship grant awards ==
In 2006, TCRF started its Fellowship Grant Award Program to fund basic science research in the fields of hematology and oncology. Since then, it has awarded $1.2 million in research grants to 22 physician scientists. Two of these grants have been awarded in memory of Ronnie Lippin, a music and public relations executive who died of breast cancer in 2006, through the Ronnie Lippin Cancer Outreach Program at TCRF.

== Patient support programs ==
TCRF provides patient support and offers a wide range of support programs for those dealing with a cancer diagnosis or remission, including a mentoring program and the Ronnie Lippin Cancer Outreach Program, which provides the public with information about cancer and how to deal with significant issues relating to the disease.

== Community education ==
TCRF has a quarterly publication aimed at educating the lay public, physicians, and oncologists with information on cancer and cancer topics. TCRF also provides educational materials for general physicians and oncologists on cancer topics through a bi-monthly Newsletter oriented for medical doctors on topics in hematology and oncology.

== Fundraising ==
TCRF receives income from pharmaceutical sponsors to conduct clinical trials, and organizes annual fundraisers.
