= 7th Division of Xinjiang Production and Construction Corps =

7th Division
- Active: 1953 – 1975; 1981 – present
- Country: China
- Allegiance: Chinese Communist Party
- Branch: Xinjiang Production and Construction Corps (XPCC)
- Type: Division; Paramilitary organisation State-owned enterprise
- Headquarters: Huyanghe, Xinjiang
- Website: www.nqs.gov.cn

Commanders
- Political Commissar: Li Huabin (李华斌) (CCP Secretary of Huyanghe)
- Commander: Song Xuehua (宋学华) (Mayor of Huyanghe)

The 7th Division (新疆生产建设兵团第七师; abbreviation for 兵团七师) is a division of the Xinjiang Production and Construction Corps (XPCC) based in Ili Kazakh Autonomous Prefecture and Karamay City, Xinjiang Uygur Autonomous Region, China. It is an economic and paramilitary unit formed in 1953 from the former 25th Infantry Division of the 9th Army of the 22nd Corps of the PLA. The 7th Agricultural Construction Division of the XPCC (新疆生产建设兵团农业建设第七师; abbreviation for 兵团农七师) was approved and renamed to the present 7th Division of the XPCC in 2012. The division is composed of 10 regiments and a direct managed farm (Kuidong Farm), and headquartered in Kuytun City.

== History ==
The National Army (民族军) occupied Wusu County in September 1945 and incorporated into the 25th Infantry Division of the 9th Army of the 22rd Corps of the PLA newly formed in 1949. The 25th Infantry Division stationed in the reclamation area in 1950 and headquartered in Paotai (炮台, present Paotai Town of Wusu County), and was renamed as the 7th Agricultural Construction Division (兵团农七师) in 1953. In March 1957, the 7th Division moved its headquarters to Kuytun from Paotai.

In July 1958, Kuytun was incorporated to Karamay from Wushi County. On March 25, 1975, the XPCC was withdrawn, the 7th Division with its farms and enterprises were devolved to the local administration. On August 29, 1975, the county-level city of Kuytun was approved to establish from Karamay. Kuytun Bureau of Farms and Land Reclamation (伊犁州奎屯农垦局) was incorporated in July 1978. Based on Kuytun Bureau of Farms and Land Reclamation, the 7th Agricultural Construction Division (兵团农七师) was officially restored to form in April 1982. the 7th Agricultural Construction Division of the XPCC (新疆生产建设兵团农业建设第七师; abbreviation for 兵团农七师) was approved to rename as the present 7th Division of the XPCC by the State Commission Office for Public Sector Reform on October 25, 2012.
