= 9th Corps (People's Republic of China) =

9th Corps (1949-52)
- Active: 1949-09/1952-11
- Country: (China)
- Part of: First Field Army
- Garrison/HQ: Shule (1949-50)

Commanders
- Notable commanders: Zhao Xiguang

The 9th Corps (Chinese: 第9军) was a military formation of the Chinese People's Liberation Army from the 1940s to the 1950s.

The 9th Corps was activated in September 1949 from defecting Republic of China Army 42nd Reorganization Division.

The Corps was composed of 25th, 26th and 27th Divisions. From mid 1949 to 1950, the divisions were located north of Wusu, southwest of Urumqi, and north of Kuqa and east of Korla, respectively.

In April 1952, the headquarters of the 9th Corps was merged with the headquarters of the 22nd Army (Tao Zhiyue's former Kuomintang command). In November 1952, the corps was inactivated.

In May 1953, 25th, 26th and 27th divisions from the corps were reorganized as 7th, 8th and 9th agriculture construction divisions of the Xinjiang Production and Construction Corps, respectively.
