= Shihezi =

County-level city in Xinjiang, China

Shihezi 石河子市 (Chinese) شىخەنزە شەھىرى (Uyghur)
- County-level & Sub-prefectural city
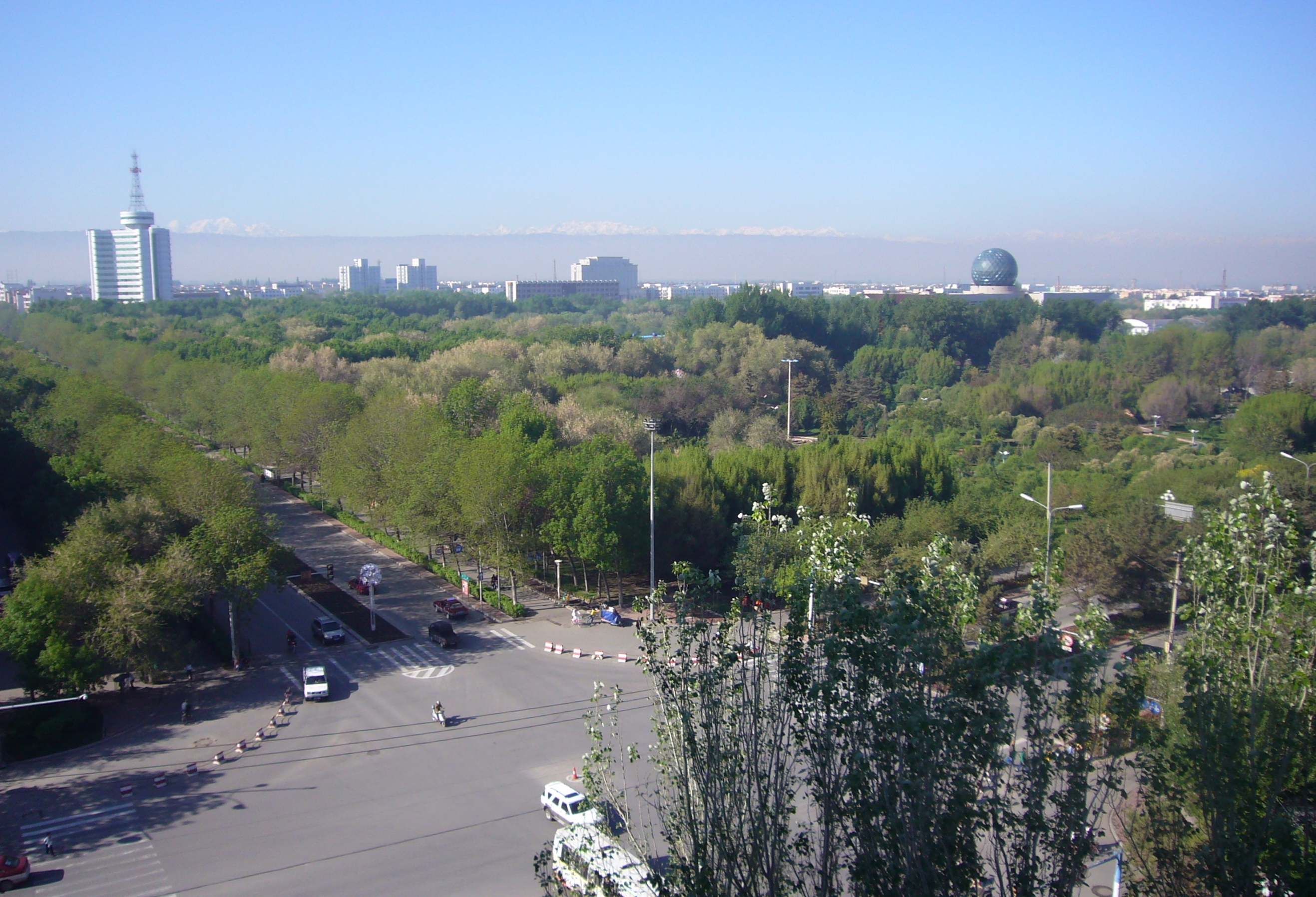
- Shihezi

- Location in Xinjiang

- Location in Xinjiang Shihezi (Xinjiang) Shihezi (China)
- Coordinates: 44°18′19″N 86°04′49″E
- Country: China
- Autonomous region: Xinjiang
- Municipal seat: Hongshan Subdistrict

Government
  - CCP Secretary: E Hongda (Political Commissar of the 8th Division)
  - Mayor: Ge Zhihui (Commander of the 8th Division)

Area
  - Total: 460 km^{2} (180 sq mi)

Population (2020)
  - Total: 498,587
  - Density: 1,100/km^{2} (2,800/sq mi)
- Time zone: UTC+8 (China Standard (Note: Locals in Xinjiang frequently observe UTC+6 (Xinjiang Time), 2 hours behind Beijing.))
- Postal code: 832000
- Area code: 0993
- Website: www.shz.gov.cn

Shihezi

Chinese name
- Chinese: 石河子
- Literal meaning: Stony river banks
Transcriptions
Standard Mandarin
- Hanyu Pinyin: Shíhézǐ

Uyghur name
- Uyghur: شىخەنزە
Transcriptions
- Latin Yëziqi: Shixenze
- Yengi Yeziⱪ: Xihənzə
- SASM/GNC: Xihanza
- Siril Yëziqi: Шихәнзә

Shihezi (Chinese: 石河子) is a sub-prefecture-level city in Northern Xinjiang, China. It has a population of 380,130 according to the 2010 census. The city is also home to Shihezi University, the second-largest comprehensive university under the Project 211 in Xinjiang.

Shihezi is the headquarter of the 8th Division of Xinjiang Production and Construction Corps and currently administered by the 8th Division. The city implemented the "division and city integration" (师市合一, shī shì héyī) management system, it shares the same leader group with the 8th Division.

== History ==
In 1951, General Wang Zhen decided to build a new base for the People's Liberation Army and selected the location of current Shihezi. Zhao Xiguang (赵锡光) took charge in the development of the city, and established the Xinjiang Production and Construction Corps in 1954.

Quasimilitary-structured farms surrounding Shihezi fueled the development of the city by producing materials for the factories that have been the economic drivers of the city. In 1974, Shihezi became a city.

== Administrative divisions ==
Shihezi contains 5 subdistricts, 2 towns, and a township-equivalent region:

Name	Simplified Chinese	Hanyu Pinyin	Uyghur (UEY)	Uyghur Latin (ULY)	Administrative division code
Subdistricts
Xincheng Subdistrict	新城街道	Xīnchéng Jiēdào	يېڭىشەھەر كوچا باشقارمىسى	Yëngisheher kocha bashqarmisi	659001001
Xiangyang Subdistrict	向阳街道	Xiàngyáng Jiēdào	شياڭياڭ كوچا باشقارمىسى	Shyangyang kocha bashqarmisi	659001002
Hongshan Subdistrict	红山街道	Hóngshān Jiēdào	خۇڭشەن كوچا باشقارمىسى	Xungshen kocha bashqarmisi	659001003
Laojie Subdistrict	老街街道	Lǎojiē Jiēdào	كونا بازار كوچا باشقارمىسى	Kona Bazar kocha bashqarmisi	659001004
Dongcheng Subdistrict	东城街道	Dōngchéng Jiēdào	دۇڭچېڭ كوچا باشقارمىسى	Dungchëng kocha bashqarmisi	659001005
Towns
Beiquan Town (Shihezi Headquarters Farm of the 8th Division)*	北泉镇 (第八师石河子总场)	Běiquán Zhèn	بېيچۇەن بازىرى	Bëychuen baziri	659001100
Shihezi Town	石河子镇	Shíhézǐ Zhèn	شىخەنزە بازىرى	Shixenze baziri	659001101
township-equivalent region
152nd Regiment Farm**	一五二团	152 Tuán	152-تۇەن	152-tuen	659001500
* One institution with two names. ** Administered by the 152nd Regiment of Xinjiang Production and Construction Corps. See also Tuntian#People's Republic of China.

== Demographics ==
Population by ethnicity – 2010 census
Ethnicity	Population	%
Han	349,149	91.85%
Hui	15,092	3.97%
Uyghur	7,574	1.99%
Kazakhs	3,042	0.80%
Tujia	1,500	0.39%
Mongol	624	0.16%
Manchu	620	0.16%
Kyrgyz	319	0.08%
Dongxiang	306	0.08%
Xibe	157	0.04%
Russian	138	0.04%
Others	1,609	0.43%
Total	380,130	100%

== Economy ==
Nowadays textile and food industries are the most important in Shihezi. The railway to Wusu and Ürümqi skirts the city, while a United Nations economic development project provided a high-quality highway system for the city. The textile industry is the primary employer, although the international trade environment on textiles has brought in fluctuations in employment. As a hub to surrounding farms, the city's destiny is currently tied with theirs. Sugar beets are cultivated near Shihezi. Cultivation of cotton in the farms was accelerated in the 1990s and now dominates the economy.

Shihezi is also home to a polysilicon factory of Daqo New Energy Corp., one of the largest polysilicon producers in the world.

== Geography and climate ==
Shihezi is located at the northern foothills of the middle part of the Tian Shan range approximately 136 kilometres (85 mi) from the regional capital of Ürümqi.

Although Shihezi is almost surrounded on the east, west and north by the Changji Hui Autonomous Prefecture (which also includes the city's eastern neighbor, the much older historically Hui town of Manas), it is not a part of it.

Located in an area further from the nearest seacoast than any other region on earth, Shihezi has a continental semi-arid climate (Köppen BSk), with a large temperature differences between summer and winter. Monthly average temperatures range from −15.3 °C (4.5 °F) in January to 25.3 °C (77.5 °F), and the annual mean temperature is 7.39 °C (45.3 °F). Precipitation is very low year-round, with an annual total of only 206 millimeters (8.11 in), compared to the annual evaporation rate, which is usually more than 1,000 millimeters (39 in).

Climate data for Shihezi, elevation 443 m (1,453 ft), (1991–2020 normals, extremes 1971–2010)
Month	Jan	Feb	Mar	Apr	May	Jun	Jul	Aug	Sep	Oct	Nov	Dec	Year
Record high °C (°F)	7.6 (45.7)	6.6 (43.9)	22.7 (72.9)	35.4 (95.7)	37.4 (99.3)	39.2 (102.6)	42.2 (108.0)	41.0 (105.8)	39.4 (102.9)	33.3 (91.9)	17.5 (63.5)	8.3 (46.9)	42.2 (108.0)
Mean daily maximum °C (°F)	−11.0 (12.2)	−5.8 (21.6)	6.5 (43.7)	20.7 (69.3)	27.0 (80.6)	31.7 (89.1)	33.0 (91.4)	31.7 (89.1)	25.9 (78.6)	16.5 (61.7)	4.0 (39.2)	−7.3 (18.9)	14.4 (58.0)
Daily mean °C (°F)	−15.6 (3.9)	−10.6 (12.9)	1.5 (34.7)	13.5 (56.3)	19.7 (67.5)	24.5 (76.1)	25.7 (78.3)	23.7 (74.7)	17.7 (63.9)	9.1 (48.4)	−0.5 (31.1)	−11.3 (11.7)	8.1 (46.6)
Mean daily minimum °C (°F)	−20.2 (−4.4)	−15.3 (4.5)	−3.3 (26.1)	6.7 (44.1)	12.5 (54.5)	17.3 (63.1)	18.5 (65.3)	16.3 (61.3)	10.1 (50.2)	2.9 (37.2)	−4.3 (24.3)	−15.0 (5.0)	2.2 (35.9)
Record low °C (°F)	−34.4 (−29.9)	−36.5 (−33.7)	−30.5 (−22.9)	−19.4 (−2.9)	−0.2 (31.6)	6.6 (43.9)	9.6 (49.3)	3.5 (38.3)	−0.5 (31.1)	−8.9 (16.0)	−28.9 (−20.0)	−36.0 (−32.8)	−36.5 (−33.7)
Average precipitation mm (inches)	10.1 (0.40)	11.0 (0.43)	12.9 (0.51)	29.0 (1.14)	31.6 (1.24)	22.1 (0.87)	22.7 (0.89)	21.3 (0.84)	13.3 (0.52)	18.4 (0.72)	19.6 (0.77)	14.2 (0.56)	226.2 (8.89)
Average precipitation days (≥ 0.1 mm)	9.4	7.6	4.8	6.2	7.4	7.3	7.5	6.4	4.4	4.9	6.8	9.7	82.4
Average snowy days	14.3	10.7	4.2	1.1	0	0	0	0	0	0.7	6.2	13.4	50.6
Average relative humidity (%)	82	81	71	49	44	46	51	53	54	63	77	84	63
Mean monthly sunshine hours	93.4	125.4	211.0	270.4	320.0	318.1	328.6	317.6	281.8	237.6	131.2	79.2	2,714.3
Percentage possible sunshine	32	42	56	66	69	69	71	75	77	71	46	29	59
Source 1: China Meteorological Administration
Source 2: Weather China

The Manas River forms the administrative border between Shihezi City and its eastern neighbor, Manas County. An extensive system of reservoirs (such as the Jiahezi Reservoir (夹河子水库; Jiāhézi shuǐkù), with the dam at 44°27′00″N 86°7′15″E) and irrigation canals has been constructed in the area, supporting irrigated agriculture.

== Education ==
Shihezi University is located in Shihezi. It is the second-largest university in Xinjiang, with approximately 40,000 students.

== Transport ==
Shihezi is served by China National Highway 312, the Northern Xinjiang and the Second Ürümqi-Jinghe Railways. Reconstruction of the Shihezi Huayuan Airport began in May 2012 and it reopened on 26 December 2015.
