= Shawan, Xinjiang =

Shawan 沙湾市 (Chinese) ساۋەن شەھىرى (Uyghur) ساۋان قالاسى (Kazakh) Savan
- County-level city
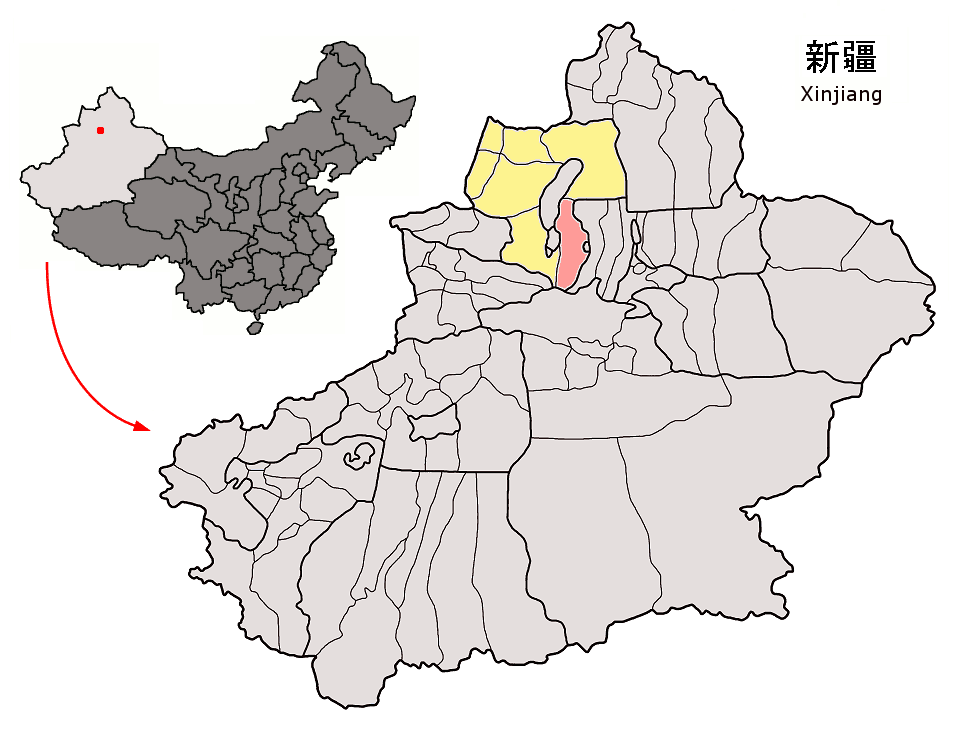
- Location of Shawan County (red) within Tacheng Prefecture (yellow) and Xinjiang

- Location of the seat in Xinjiang Shawan (Xinjiang) Shawan (China)
- Country: China
- Autonomous region: Xinjiang
- Prefecture: Tacheng
- Municipal seat: Sadawkhuza (Sandaohezi)

Area
  - Total: 12,458.16 km^{2} (4,810.12 sq mi)

Population (2020)
  - Total: 301,046
  - Density: 24.1646/km^{2} (62.5859/sq mi)
- Time zone: UTC+8 (China Standard (Note: Locals in Xinjiang frequently observe UTC+6 (Xinjiang Time), 2 hours behind Beijing.))
- Website: www.xjswx.gov.cn

Shawan, Xinjiang

Chinese name
- Simplified Chinese: 沙湾市
- Traditional Chinese: 沙灣市
Transcriptions
Standard Mandarin
- Hanyu Pinyin: Shāwān Shì

Uyghur name
- Uyghur: ساۋەن شەھىرى
Transcriptions
- Latin Yëziqi: Sawen shehiri
- Yengi Yeziⱪ: Savən xəⱨiri
- Siril Yëziqi: Савән шәһири

Kazakh name
- Kazakh: ساۋان قالاسى; Сауан қаласы Sauan qalasy

Shawan, also transliterated from Chinese to Uyghur as Savan, is a county-level city situated in the north of the Xinjiang Uyghur Autonomous Region under the administration of the Tacheng Prefecture. It has an area of 12,468 km^{2} (4,814 sq mi) with a population of 200,000.

== Transport ==
- China National Highway 312

== Demographics ==
The proportion of nationalities in Shawan City
| Nationality | Percentage |
| Han Chinese | 64.5% |
| Kazakhs | 18.4% |
| Hui | 11.1% |
| Uyghurs | 4.7% |
| Mongols | 0.2% |
| Russians | 0.1% |
| Manchus | 0.1% |
| Others | 0.8% |
Source of the population statistics :

== Administrative divisions ==
Shawan is divided into 9 towns, 3 townships.

| Name | Simplified Chinese | Hanyu Pinyin | Uyghur (UEY) | Uyghur Latin (ULY) | Kazakh (Arabic script) | Kazakh (Cyrillic script) | Administrative division code |
|---|---|---|---|---|---|---|---|
Towns
| Sidawkhuza Town (Sidaohezi Town) | 四道河子镇 | Sìdàohézǐ Zhèn | سىداۋخۇزا بازىرى | sidawxuza baziri | سىداۋحىزى قالاشىعى | Сыдаухызы қалашығы | 654203101 |
| Laoshawan Town (Old Shawan Town) | 老沙湾镇 | Lǎoshāwān Zhèn | كونا ساۋەن بازىرى | kona sawen baziri | كونە ساۋان قالاشىعى | Көне Сауан қалашығы | 654203102 |
| Ulan Us Town | 乌兰乌苏镇 | Wūlánwūsū Zhèn | ئۇلان ئۇس بازىرى | Ulan Us baziri | الاۋسىن قالاشىعى | Алаусын қалашығы | 654203103 |
| Yansikhay Town | 安集海镇 | Ānjíhǎi Zhèn | يەنسىخەي بازىرى | yensixey baziri | ءانجيحاي قالاشىعى | Әнжихәй қалашығы | 654203104 |
| Dongwan Town | 东湾镇 | Dōngwān Zhèn | دۇڭۋەن بازىرى | dungwen baziri | دۇڭۋان قالاشىعى | Дұңуан қалашығы | 654203105 |
| Sigebi Town | 西戈壁镇 | Xīgēbì Zhèn | شىگوبى بازىرى | shigobi baziri | شيگوبي قالاشىعى | Шыгоби қалашығы | 654203106 |
| Liumaowan Town | 柳毛湾镇 | Liǔmáowān Zhèn | ليۇماۋۋەن بازىرى | lyumawwen baziri | ليۋماۋۋان قالاشىعى | Люмаууан қалашығы | 654203107 |
| Jingouhe Town | 金沟河镇 | Jīngōuhé Zhèn | قورغاس بازىرى (جىنگوۋخې بازىرى) | lyumawwen baziri (jingowxë baziri) | قورعاس قالاشىعى | Қорғас қалашығы | 654203108 |
| Sadawkhuza Town (Sandaohezi Town) | 三道河子镇 | Sāndàohézǐ Zhèn | سەندوخوزا بازىرى | sendoxoza baziri | ساندىعوزى قالاشىعى | Сандығозы қалашығы | 654203109 |
Townships
| Shanghudi Township | 商户地乡 | Shānghùdì Xiāng | شاڭخۇدى يېزىسى | shangxudi yëzisi | شاڭحۋدي اۋىلى | Шаңхуди ауылы | 654203200 |
| Daquan Township | 大泉乡 | Dàquán Xiāng | داچۇەن يېزىسى | dachuen yëzisi | داچۋان اۋىلى | Дачуан ауылы | 654203201 |
| Bortünggi Township | 博尔通古乡 | Bó'ěrtōnggǔ Xiāng | بورتۈڭگى يېزىسى | bortünggi yëzisi | بورتىنكو اۋىلى | Бөртінкө ауылы | 654203202 |

Others:

- Bortünggi Ranch (博尔通古牧场) (بورتۈڭگى چارۋىچىلىق مەيدانى) (بورتىنكو مال شارۋاشىلىعى الاڭىنداعى)
- City Pedigree Ranch (市良种场) (شەھەرلىك ئۇرۇق مەيدانى) (قالالىق سورتتى تۇقىم الاڭىنداعى)
- XPCC Beiquan Branch (兵团北泉镇分部)
- XPCC 121st Regiment (兵团一二一团) (121-تۇەن مەيدانى)
- XPCC 123rd Regiment (兵团一二三团) (123-تۇەن مەيدانى)
- XPCC 133rd Regiment (兵团一三三团) (133-تۇەن مەيدانى)
- XPCC 134th Regiment (兵团一三四团) (134-تۇەن مەيدانى)
- XPCC 141st Regiment (兵团一四一团) (141-تۇەن مەيدانى)
- XPCC 142nd Regiment (兵团一四二团) (142-تۇەن مەيدانى)
- XPCC 143rd Regiment (兵团一四三团) (143-تۇەن مەيدانى)
- XPCC 144th Regiment (兵团一四四团) (144-تۇەن مەيدانى)

== Climate ==
Climate data for Shawan, elevation 522 m (1,713 ft), (1991–2020 normals, extremes 1981–2010)
| Month | Jan | Feb | Mar | Apr | May | Jun | Jul | Aug | Sep | Oct | Nov | Dec | Year |
|---|---|---|---|---|---|---|---|---|---|---|---|---|---|
| Record high °C (°F) | 4.4 (39.9) | 5.5 (41.9) | 24.0 (75.2) | 35.6 (96.1) | 37.7 (99.9) | 39.5 (103.1) | 40.9 (105.6) | 39.2 (102.6) | 38.5 (101.3) | 31.4 (88.5) | 19.0 (66.2) | 8.3 (46.9) | 40.9 (105.6) |
| Mean daily maximum °C (°F) | −10.6 (12.9) | −5.9 (21.4) | 5.7 (42.3) | 19.7 (67.5) | 26.2 (79.2) | 31.0 (87.8) | 32.1 (89.8) | 30.7 (87.3) | 25.0 (77.0) | 15.7 (60.3) | 3.5 (38.3) | −7.1 (19.2) | 13.8 (56.9) |
| Daily mean °C (°F) | −14.8 (5.4) | −10.1 (13.8) | 1.2 (34.2) | 13.3 (55.9) | 19.7 (67.5) | 24.9 (76.8) | 26.2 (79.2) | 24.5 (76.1) | 18.6 (65.5) | 9.7 (49.5) | −0.5 (31.1) | −10.8 (12.6) | 8.5 (47.3) |
| Mean daily minimum °C (°F) | −18.1 (−0.6) | −13.7 (7.3) | −2.7 (27.1) | 7.9 (46.2) | 14.0 (57.2) | 19.3 (66.7) | 20.9 (69.6) | 19.1 (66.4) | 13.0 (55.4) | 5.1 (41.2) | −3.5 (25.7) | −13.6 (7.5) | 4.0 (39.1) |
| Record low °C (°F) | −32.3 (−26.1) | −32.7 (−26.9) | −27.4 (−17.3) | −8.6 (16.5) | 0.1 (32.2) | 8.0 (46.4) | 10.7 (51.3) | 7.2 (45.0) | 0.4 (32.7) | −6.3 (20.7) | −28.9 (−20.0) | −34.3 (−29.7) | −34.3 (−29.7) |
| Average precipitation mm (inches) | 9.2 (0.36) | 9.4 (0.37) | 12.1 (0.48) | 27.7 (1.09) | 30.9 (1.22) | 20.7 (0.81) | 22.0 (0.87) | 19.5 (0.77) | 11.9 (0.47) | 17.0 (0.67) | 18.2 (0.72) | 13.1 (0.52) | 211.7 (8.35) |
| Average precipitation days (≥ 0.1 mm) | 8.4 | 6.8 | 5.0 | 6.2 | 7.5 | 7.7 | 8.5 | 6.7 | 4.5 | 4.6 | 6.5 | 9.6 | 82 |
| Average snowy days | 16.8 | 13.0 | 5.7 | 1.0 | 0 | 0 | 0 | 0 | 0 | 0.8 | 7.8 | 18.1 | 63.2 |
| Average relative humidity (%) | 80 | 79 | 70 | 48 | 41 | 40 | 45 | 45 | 46 | 59 | 75 | 82 | 59 |
| Mean monthly sunshine hours | 126.5 | 143.6 | 212.8 | 267.5 | 312.1 | 311.4 | 322.3 | 308.6 | 272.4 | 227.2 | 131.6 | 98.6 | 2,734.6 |
| Percentage possible sunshine | 44 | 48 | 57 | 65 | 68 | 67 | 70 | 73 | 74 | 68 | 47 | 36 | 60 |
Source: China Meteorological Administration

Climate data for Paotai, Shawan County, elevation 337 m (1,106 ft), (1991–2020 normals)
| Month | Jan | Feb | Mar | Apr | May | Jun | Jul | Aug | Sep | Oct | Nov | Dec | Year |
|---|---|---|---|---|---|---|---|---|---|---|---|---|---|
| Mean daily maximum °C (°F) | −12.8 (9.0) | −7.1 (19.2) | 6.5 (43.7) | 21.2 (70.2) | 27.9 (82.2) | 32.7 (90.9) | 33.8 (92.8) | 32.3 (90.1) | 26.5 (79.7) | 16.8 (62.2) | 3.8 (38.8) | −8.6 (16.5) | 14.4 (57.9) |
| Daily mean °C (°F) | −17.6 (0.3) | −12.5 (9.5) | 0.7 (33.3) | 13.6 (56.5) | 20.3 (68.5) | 25.2 (77.4) | 26.2 (79.2) | 24.3 (75.7) | 18.3 (64.9) | 9.3 (48.7) | −1.1 (30.0) | −12.5 (9.5) | 7.8 (46.1) |
| Mean daily minimum °C (°F) | −21.6 (−6.9) | −17.2 (1.0) | −4.6 (23.7) | 6.7 (44.1) | 13.2 (55.8) | 18.1 (64.6) | 19.4 (66.9) | 17.3 (63.1) | 11.0 (51.8) | 3.2 (37.8) | −4.9 (23.2) | −15.8 (3.6) | 2.1 (35.7) |
| Average precipitation mm (inches) | 7.5 (0.30) | 7.1 (0.28) | 9.3 (0.37) | 19.9 (0.78) | 20.1 (0.79) | 16.1 (0.63) | 21.6 (0.85) | 13.0 (0.51) | 11.0 (0.43) | 14.6 (0.57) | 12.5 (0.49) | 9.3 (0.37) | 162 (6.37) |
| Average precipitation days (≥ 0.1 mm) | 7.3 | 5.7 | 3.8 | 5.7 | 7.1 | 7.0 | 7.7 | 5.9 | 4.3 | 5.0 | 5.3 | 7.6 | 72.4 |
| Average snowy days | 13.3 | 10.2 | 3.9 | 0.7 | 0 | 0 | 0 | 0 | 0 | 0.5 | 5.4 | 13.0 | 47 |
| Average relative humidity (%) | 81 | 82 | 71 | 47 | 41 | 44 | 51 | 52 | 51 | 61 | 77 | 83 | 62 |
| Mean monthly sunshine hours | 110.8 | 135.6 | 216.6 | 268.5 | 323.4 | 324.8 | 332.7 | 322.0 | 280.9 | 231.5 | 135.2 | 89.3 | 2,771.3 |
| Percentage possible sunshine | 38 | 45 | 58 | 65 | 70 | 70 | 72 | 76 | 76 | 70 | 48 | 33 | 60 |
Source: China Meteorological Administration
