= Vehicle registration plates of Hong Kong =

Hong Kong SAR
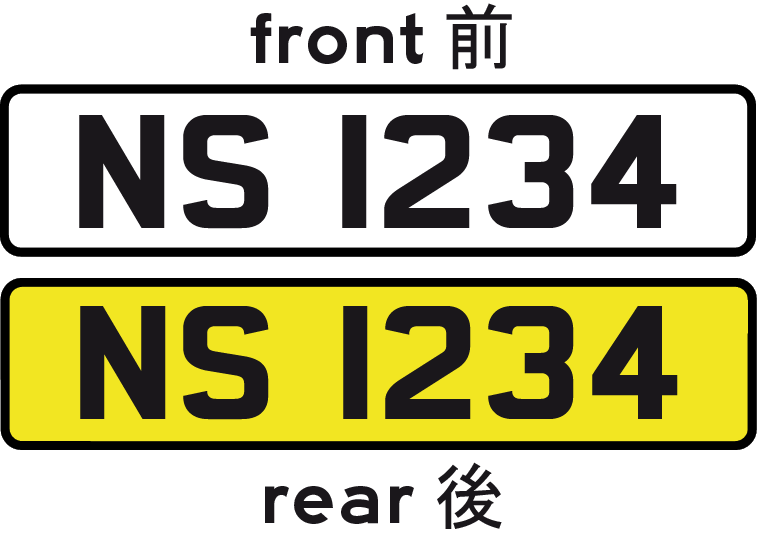
- Regular legal standard number plate from Hong Kong SAR.
- Country: Hong Kong
- Country code: HK
- Colour (front): Black on white
- Colour (rear): Black on yellow

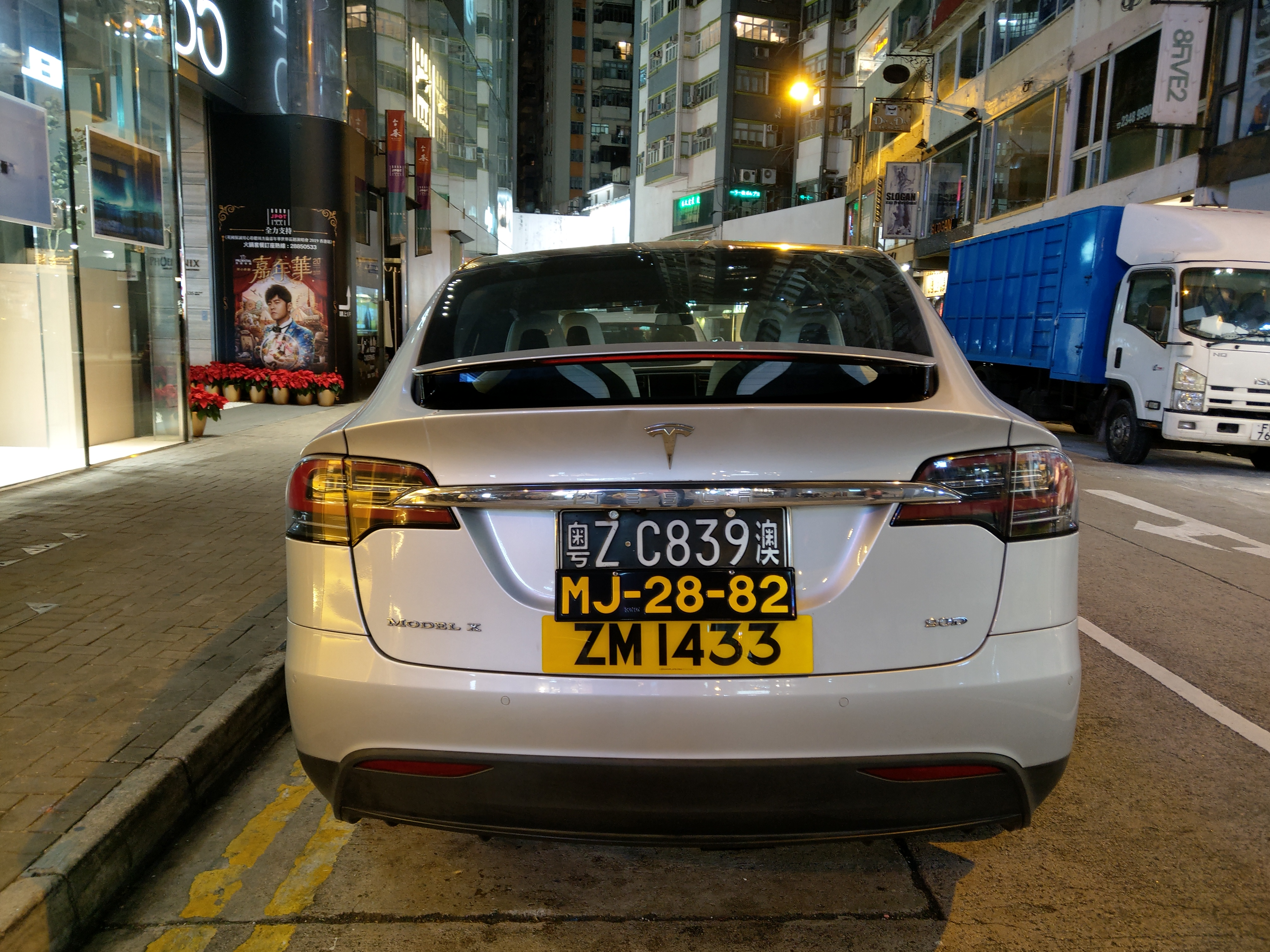
A Tesla Model X in Hong Kong displaying number plates from mainland China, Macau, and Hong Kong – the latter is a cross-border plate for Macanese-registered vehicles entering Hong Kong

Vehicle registration plates in Hong Kong are managed by the Transport Department of Hong Kong. The vehicle registration system in Hong Kong is independent from those of Mainland China and Macau. Hong Kong's official UN road code is HK, as of June 2024.

Having been a British territory until 1997, number plates in Hong Kong comply with British Standard BS AU 145a, remaining similar to those of the United Kingdom. The physical number plates are not provided by the government but are made to order by garages.

== Overview ==
Each vehicle must display two registration plates: one at the front, and one at the rear of the vehicle. The front plate has black characters on a white background, and the rear plate has black characters on a yellow background. The height of the letters and numerals are not less than 8 cm (3.1 in) and not more than 11 cm (4.3 in). The plates should comply with British Standard B.S. 145a, and have permanently marked on the plate the specification number "B.S. AU 145a".

Image	Description
	Private vehicles, Public transport: The standard format for these vehicles is "XX (#)###", where 'XX' are two letters from the Latin alphabet, and '(#)###' is a sequence of between three and four digits. The plate displayed on the front of the vehicle has a white background, while the one at the rear is yellow.
	Cross-border plates: A Hong Kong-registered vehicle must display a cross-border plate when entering Guangdong Province. The usual format of these is "粤Z·####港", where 粤Z is the prefix given to both Hong Kong and Macau, #### is a string of sequential digits and/or Latin letters, and the 港 suffix represents Hong Kong. These are produced to Mainland Chinese standards, but are white-on-black.
	Diplomatic vehicles: Unlike some other countries or territories (where diplomatic cars have special registration numbers), cars operated by foreign consulates, consular staff, and various international organisations simply display a "CC" (consular corps) badge, rendered in red on a white background. These are oval in shape, and are much smaller than the registration plate, but are affixed to the front and back of the vehicle. Diplomatic cars are registered in the same series as regular vehicles (although they are permitted to bear personalised registration plates).
	Military vehicles: The People's Liberation Army uses registration plates with the "ZG" prefix on their vehicles (Zhù Gǎng 駐港 means "stationed in Hong Kong"). Unusually, these plates use the same font as those in mainland China, but comply with British Standard B.S. 145a insofar as they feature black alphanumerics on a white background at the front of the vehicle, and black alphanumerics on a yellow background at the rear.

== Numbering system ==
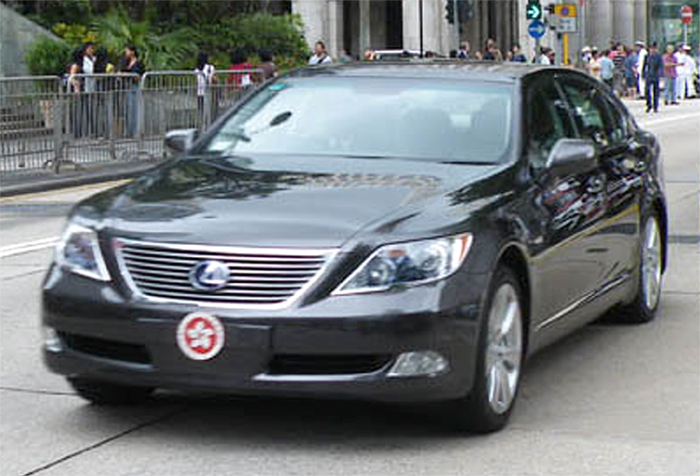
The Lexus LS 600h L bearing the HKSAR emblem in place of a registration plate, the official transport of the Chief Executive of Hong Kong

Vehicles of the Chief Executive do not have registration plates. Instead, they have the Emblem of Hong Kong in front and at the rear. During British administration, the vehicle of the Governor bore the St Edward's Crown emblem.

=== Usual numbers ===
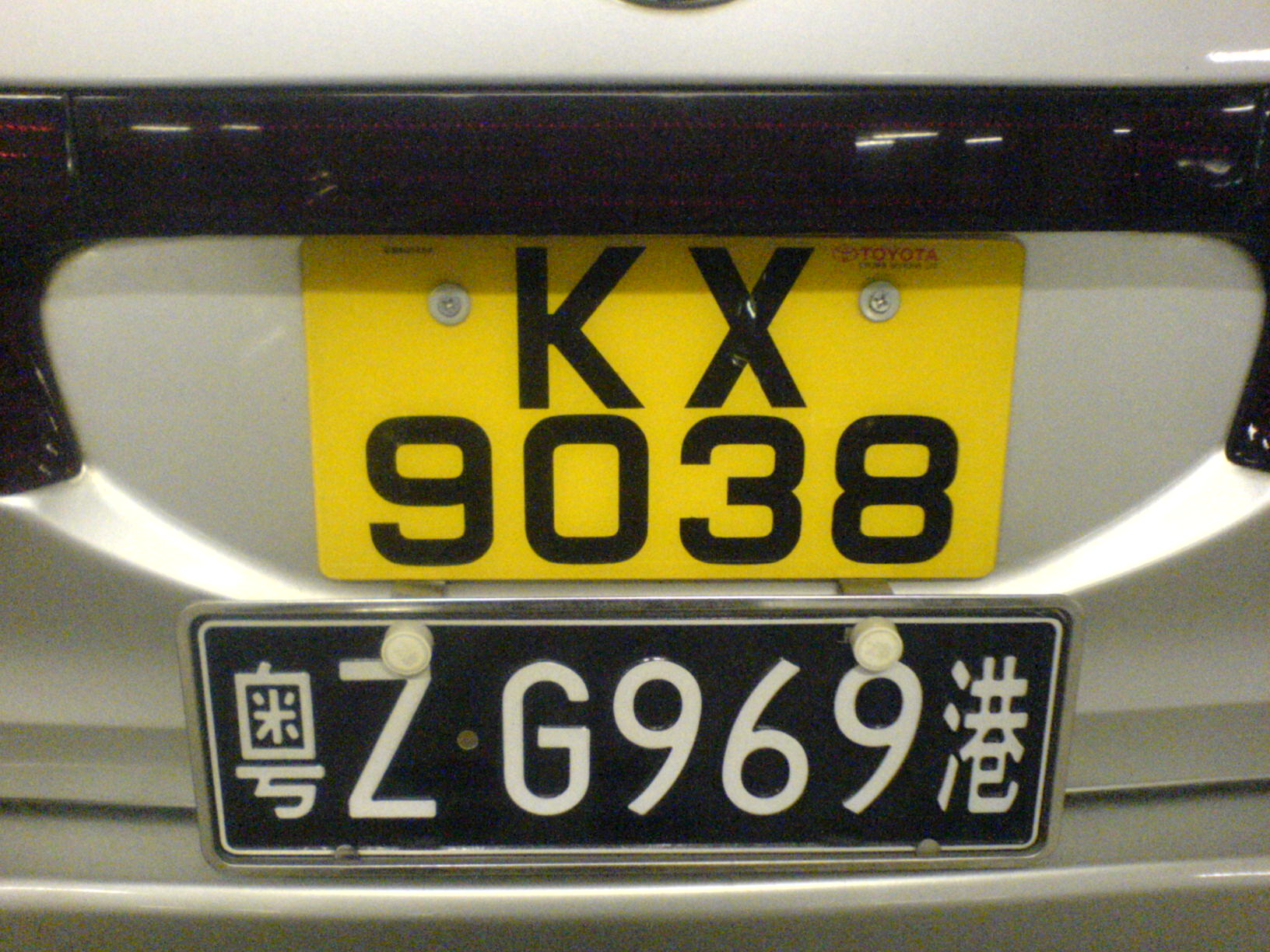
Chinese border-crossing plate displayed on a vehicle below a standard Hong Kong plate

Regular registrations consist of a two-letter prefix followed by a number between 102 and 9998 (refer to the Special Registration Marks section for a list of withheld numbers) without leading zeroes. The letters "I", "O" and "Q" are not used in prefixes to avoid ambiguity.

Prefix	Date	Notes
Non-Prefixes (1903 - 1959)
Non-prefix (1–9999)	1903 - 1959	
2 Letter Prefixes (1949 - 2025)
HK, XX	1949 - 1960	In the 1950s and 1960s, some HK registration plates used HK to represent "Hong Kong" because there were not enough registration plates without prefixes.
A*	1964 - 1973	Except for AM (only Government vehicles). Shortly prior to the handover of Hong Kong on 1 July 1997, the Advanced Detachment of the People's Liberation Army entered Hong Kong. Their vehicles were assigned a series of AD-prefixed registration plates, but continued to display their mainland Chinese registrations while in Hong Kong.
B*	1973 - August 1979	BA and BF prefixes were skipped until 2003.
C*	August 1979 - August 1983	
D*	August 1983 - October 1988	
E*	November 1988 - January 1992	
F*	January 1992 - May 1994	FR, FT, FU and FV are typically issued to vehicles whose primary registration is abroad (usually Mainland China).
G*	May 1994 - January 1997	
H*	January 1997 - March 1999	Except for HK which was issued in the 1950s to 1960s.
J*	March 1999 - April 2001	
K*	April 2001 - May 2003	
L*	May 2003 - August 2005	Except for LC (Legislative Council).
M*	August 2005 - September 2007	
N*	September 2007 - November 2009	
P*	November 2009 - September 2011	
R*	September 2011 - May 2013	
S*	May 2013 - October 2014	
T*	October 2014 - March 2016	
U*	March 2016 - September 2017	
V*	September 2017 - March 2019	VV is non-exclusively used for village vehicles.
W*	March 2019 - October 2020	
X*	October 2020 - May 2022	Except for XX which was issued in the 1950s to 1960s.
Y*	May 2022 - December 2023	
Z*	December 2023 - April 2025	ZG is for the People's Liberation Army in Hong Kong. ZM, ZN and ZP are issued to Macanese-registered vehicles in Hong Kong, and are the equivalent of Chinese cross-border plates
2-Letter Plates Returned to Government, which are not allocated to any vehicles in the reversible order (From May 2025)
W*	May 2025 – March 2026	Started from WA to WZ
V*	March 2026 - present	Starts from VA

Some prefixes are reserved and have special meanings.

From May 2025, the vehicle registration marks returned to Transport Department which were not allocated to any vehicles will be used, starting from the plates WA to WZ in reverse alphabetical order. In other words, VA to VZ will be used after registration marks beginning with WA to WZ have been allocated, and UA to UZ after exhaustion of plates beginning with VA to VZ and so on. Such arrangement is considered to be able to avoid the need of modifying existing computing systems and laws.

=== Motorcycles ===
Formerly, motorcycles used a different set of registration marks. Like the marks for cars, the very first numbers had no prefixes. Later, marks with a single-letter prefix were issued. For example: "B 281", "C 367", &c.

The separate issuance system of registration marks for motorcycles has been discontinued and merged with the main system. Some registered motorcycles still bear the early marks. Hence, a unique registration mark without letter prefix could be found on two different types of vehicles.

=== Unusual numbers ===
==== One-letter prefixes ====
- "A" prefix for ambulances of the Fire Services Department of the government
- "F" prefix for fire engines and other vehicles of the Fire Services Department of the government
- "T" prefix for use by the motor trade, especially on vehicles that are still unlicensed. These plates are unusual in that they are not specific to any vehicle. They are red-on-white and usually displayed in a plastic holder attached temporarily to the vehicle by rubber straps. The 'T' is followed by up to five numerals.

==== Special prefixes ====
- "AM" is reserved for government vehicles.
- "LC" is reserved for Legislative Council vehicles.
- "ZG" (for Zhù Gǎng 駐港 which means "stationed in Hong Kong") is for the People's Liberation Army in Hong Kong. ZG plates are not issued with the standard fonts seen on civilian plates. The font used is the same as that of mainland Chinese plates. However, the plates are still black-on-white in the front and black-on-yellow in the rear.
- "ZM", "ZN" and "ZP" is used for vehicles registered in Macau which are permitted to enter Hong Kong via Hong Kong-Zhuhai-Macao Bridge.
- formerly "UC" was reserved for the then Urban Council. Now available to civilian vehicles.
- formerly "RC" was reserved for the then Regional Council. Now available to civilian vehicles.
- formerly "HA" was reserved for the Hospital Authority. Now available to civilian vehicles.

==== Letter suffix ====
- "T" suffix for semi-trailers and have a prefix up to 5 digits.
  Semi-trailer's plate

==== Letters-only ====
These are specific car numbers with no numbers, simply letters only

- "CJ" for the Chief Justice of the Court of Final Appeal
- "CS" for the Chief Secretary for Administration
- "FS" for the Financial Secretary
- "SJ" for the Secretary for Justice

==== Other unusual numbers ====
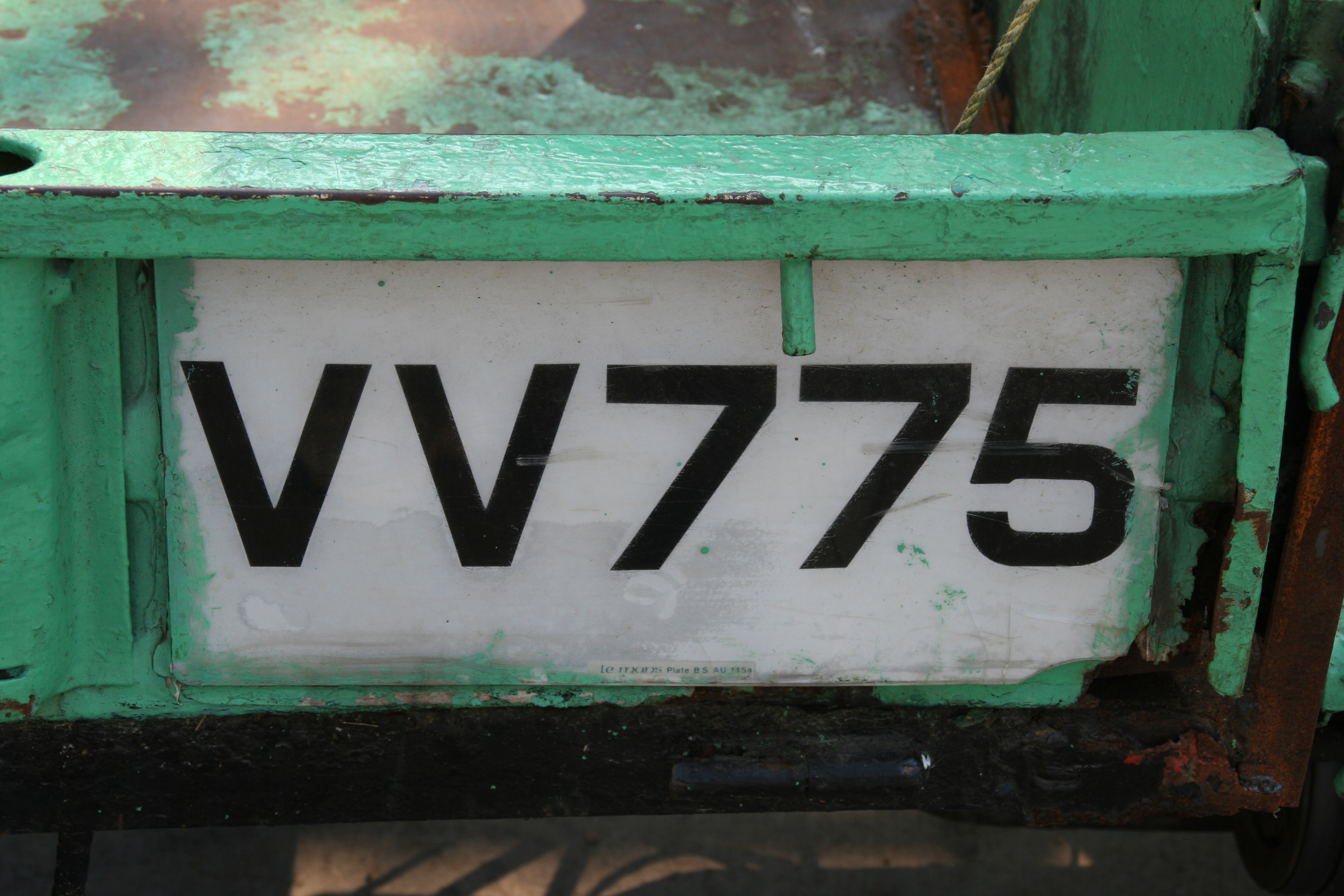
VV-series plate

- "VV" non-exclusively for village vehicles; small vehicles on narrow paths where usual vehicles are prohibited. The numerals may have leading zeroes. They are used on Lantau Island and Lamma Island to take provisions from the wharf to the villages. VV stands for "village vehicle". They are also available to public.
- The registration marks used by vehicles of British Army in Hong Kong used the same format as British military vehicles elsewhere: two numbers, then two letters, and two numbers. For example, "15KL44".

=== Special registration marks ===
A car number is a special registration mark if

- it has no prefix; or
- its numerals are any of the following:
  - (1-digit numbers) 2, 3, 4, 5, 6, 7, 8, 9 (1 is reserved for the Commissioner of Police)
  - (two repeated digits) 11, 22, 33, 44, 55, 66, 77, 88, 99
  - (three repeated digits) 111, 222, 333, 444, 555, 666, 777, 888, 999
  - (four repeated digits) 1111, 2222, 3333, 4444, 5555, 6666, 7777, 8888, 9999
  - (multiples of 10) 10, 20, 30, 40, 50, 60, 70, 80, 90
  - (multiples of 100) 100, 200, 300, 400, 500, 600, 700, 800, 900
  - (multiples of 1000) 1000, 2000, 3000, 4000, 5000, 6000, 7000, 8000, 9000
  - 123, 234, 345, 456, 567, 678, 789
  - 1234, 2345, 3456, 4567, 5678, 6789
  - (other two digit) 12, 13, 14, 15, 16, 17, 18, 19, 21, 23, 24, 25, 26, 27, 28, 29, 31, 32, 34, 35, 36, 37, 38, 39, 41, 42, 43, 45, 46, 47, 48, 49, 51, 52, 53, 54, 56, 57, 58, 59, 61, 62, 63, 64, 65, 67, 68, 69, 71, 72, 73, 74, 75, 76, 78, 79, 81, 82, 83, 84, 85, 86, 87, 89, 91, 92, 93, 94, 95, 96, 97, 98
  - (two double digits) 1100, 1122, 1133, 1144, 1155, 1166, 1177, 1188, 1199, 2200, 2211, 2233, 2244, 2255, 2266, 2277, 2288, 2299, 3300, 3311, 3322, 3344, 3355, 3366, 3377, 3388, 3399, 4400, 4411, 4422, 4433, 4455, 4466, 4477, 4488, 4499, 5500, 5511, 5522, 5533, 5544, 5566, 5577, 5588, 5599, 6600, 6611, 6622, 6633, 6644, 6655, 6677, 6688, 6699, 7700, 7711, 7722, 7733, 7744, 7755, 7766, 7788, 7799, 8800, 8811, 8822, 8833, 8844, 8855, 8866, 8877, 8899, 9900, 9911, 9922, 9933, 9944, 9955, 9966, 9977, 9988
  - (4-digit palindromes) 1001, 1221, 1331, 1441, 1551, 1661, 1771, 1881, 1991, 2002, 2112, 2332, 2442, 2552, 2662, 2772, 2882, 2992, 3003, 3113, 3223, 3443, 3553, 3663, 3773, 3883, 3993, 4004, 4114, 4224, 4334, 4554, 4664, 4774, 4884, 4994, 5005, 5115, 5225, 5335, 5445, 5665, 5775, 5885, 5995, 6006, 6116, 6226, 6336, 6446, 6556, 6776, 6886, 6996, 7007, 7117, 7227, 7337, 7447, 7557, 7667, 7887, 7997, 8008, 8118, 8228, 8338, 8448, 8558, 8668, 8778, 8998, 9009, 9119, 9229, 9339, 9449, 9559, 9669, 9779, 9889
  - (3-digit palindromes) 101, 121, 131, 141, 151, 161, 171, 181, 191, 202, 212, 232, 242, 252, 262, 272, 282, 292, 303, 313, 323, 343, 353, 363, 373, 383, 393, 404, 414, 424, 434, 454, 464, 474, 484, 494, 505, 515, 525, 535, 545, 565, 575, 585, 595, 606, 616, 626, 636, 646, 656, 676, 686, 696, 707, 717, 727, 737, 747, 757, 767, 787, 797, 808, 818, 828, 838, 848, 858, 868, 878, 898, 909, 919, 929, 939, 949, 959, 969, 979, 989
  - (repeated two digits) 1010, 1212, 1313, 1414, 1515, 1616, 1717, 1818, 1919, 2020, 2121, 2323, 2424, 2525, 2626, 2727, 2828, 2929, 3030, 3131, 3232, 3434, 3535, 3636, 3737, 3838, 3939, 4040, 4141, 4242, 4343, 4545, 4646, 4747, 4848, 4949, 5050, 5151, 5252, 5353, 5454, 5656, 5757, 5858, 5959, 6060, 6161, 6262, 6363, 6464, 6565, 6767, 6868, 6969, 7070, 7171, 7272, 7373, 7474, 7575, 7676, 7878, 7979, 8080, 8181, 8282, 8383, 8484, 8585, 8686, 8787, 8989, 9090, 9191, 9292, 9393, 9494, 9595, 9696, 9797, 9898

Although unlisted above, some traditional lucky numbers may be reserved, especially numbers that contain 3 or 8, which are pronounced in Cantonese similarly to words that mean "long life" and "prosperity" respectively. For example, 168 is always a reserved number since its pronunciation in Cantonese means "Rich all-time".

Lucky numbers are allocated only after sale by public auction which takes place from time to time. The proceeds of the auction goes to the Government Lotteries Fund to be used for charitable purposes.

=== Owners of number 1 to 10 ===
The plate "1" is reserved for the Commissioner of Police, while plate numbers '2' to '10' have all been sold at auction. Some of the owners are Hong Kong celebrities. The current owners of number plates 1 to 10 are:

- 1 : Reserved for the Commissioner of Police
- 2 : Wong Ming Hung, bought for HKD $9.5 million in 1993, previously reserved for the Financial Secretary
- 3 : Cheng Kung See, bought for HKD $1.03 million in 1983
- 4 : Cecil Chao, bought for HKD $147,000 in 1978
- 5 : Joseph Lau Luen Hung, bought for HKD $2.5 million in 1993
- 6 : Sir Run Run Shaw, bought for $330,000 in 1978
- 7 : Originally bought by Heng Ji Kau for HKD $4.8 million; due to his passing, it is now held by his daughter-in-law Leung Yee Lai
- 8 : Law Ding Bon, bought for HKD $5 million in 1988
- 9 : Albert Yeung, bought for HKD $13 million in 1994
- 10 : Yung Wing Dou, bought for HKD $206,000 in 1977

== Auction of numbers ==
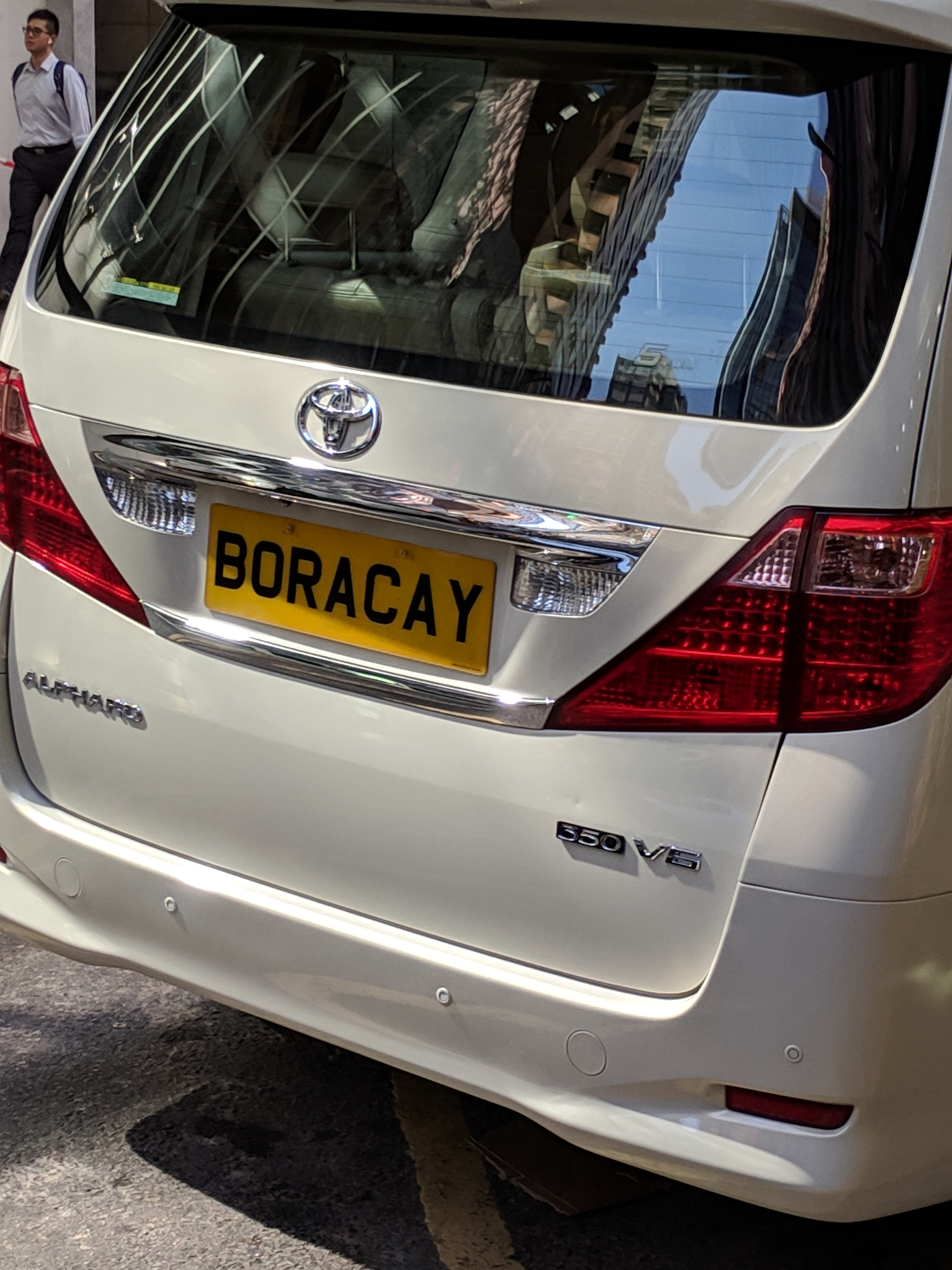
A personalised vehicle registration plate

Since 1973, the Transport Department of the Hong Kong government has conducted auctions to sell numbers. Currently, auctions are usually on Saturdays and sometimes on Sundays, and there are about two auctions per month. Numbers sold must be assigned to a car registered in the name of the buyer of the number within 12 months from the date of auction. The car can be an existing car of the buyer, or a car purchased from someone else after the auction, or a brand new car to be purchased after the auction. The Transport Department can advise whether a number has been allocated.

=== Auction of special registration marks ===
A special registration mark obtained in an auction is not transferable, that is to say, the number can be used only on vehicles registered under the name of the buyer. Transferring a special registration mark from one vehicle to another is permitted provided that they are both owned by the same person. Sale or transfer of vehicles bearing a special registration mark to someone else would lose that special registration mark. If the buyer is assigned the special registration mark to a vehicle, and later dies, the special registration mark cannot be transferred together with the vehicle to their heirs. Therefore, it is very important to consider in whose name one should buy a special registration mark in an auction. The use of a limited liability company as the buyer gets around the non-transferable restriction because of its perpetual succession and the ability to transfer the company shares.

=== Reserving numbers for auction ===
Except with "AM", "LC" or "ZG" prefixes, any unallocated usual numbers may be reserved for auction, provided it has an earlier prefix in the sequence, or the current prefix, or the next immediate prefix. For example, if the current prefix is "LX", then a number with a prefix "AA", "AB", ..."AZ", "BA", ... "LX", or "LY" may be reserved for auction. Numbers having no prefix or a "XX" prefix may also be reserved for auction. "ZM", "ZN" and "ZP" prefix are reserved for vehicles registered in Macau and were not allowed for auction after the prefix runs to "ZL". To reserve a non-special registration mark for auction, one needs to pay a deposit of HK$1000. The minimum price for the number is also HK$1000. If the number is successfully bid for by a person other than the person who reserved the number, their deposit is refunded. If no one else bids at the auction, the number is sold to the person who reserved the number, for HK$1000. If it is a special registration mark, there is no deposit to pay, and the minimum price will be set by the Transport Department but will be higher than HK$1000.

=== Personalised Vehicle Registration Marks Scheme ===
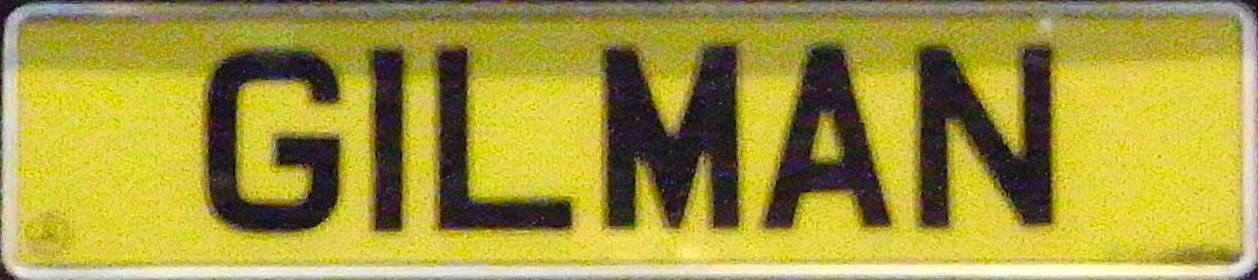
Personalised vehicle registration marks scheme

The Personalised Vehicle Registration Marks Scheme was adopted in 2006 to allow for the creation of numbers with up to 8 characters (including letters and/or numbers). The letters "I", "O" and "Q" are banned from use in the new scheme, with the former two letters officially recognised as numbers "1" and "0" respectively. Since "I" and "O" look identical to "1" and "0" under the standard font type used on Hong Kong plates, phrases such as "SIU SIU" and "I LOVE U" can be printed on the plates, although they are officially recognised as "S1U S1U" and "1 L0VE U", respectively.

The numbers under this scheme are auctioned for a minimum of HK$5000. Although drivers are usually granted their choice of plate, obtaining a unique or easily recognised plate can be very competitive. For example, the registration "1 L0VE U" was sold at a charity auction for HK$1.4 million. The first PVRMS auction was held on 16 September 2006.

== See also ==
- Vehicle registration plates of China
- Vehicle registration plates of the United Kingdom
- Vehicle registration plates of Macau
