= Vehicle registration plates of Macau =

SAR Macau
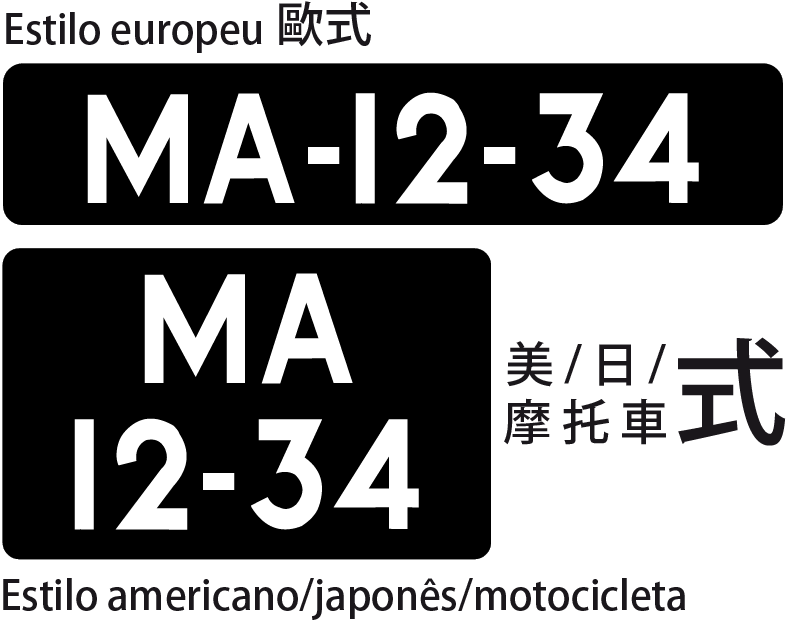
- Macanese registration plates for private vehicles, as observed in 2009. Cars can be fitted with both types of plate, but motorcycles are always fitted with square ones.
- Country: Macau
- Country code: None

Current series
- Serial format: MA-12-34
- Colour (front): White on black
- Colour (rear): White on black

In Macau, vehicle registration marks have been issued by the Transport Bureau since 2008. The bureau does not provide the registration plates themselves; these are made by garages and vehicle accessory shops at the owners' request.

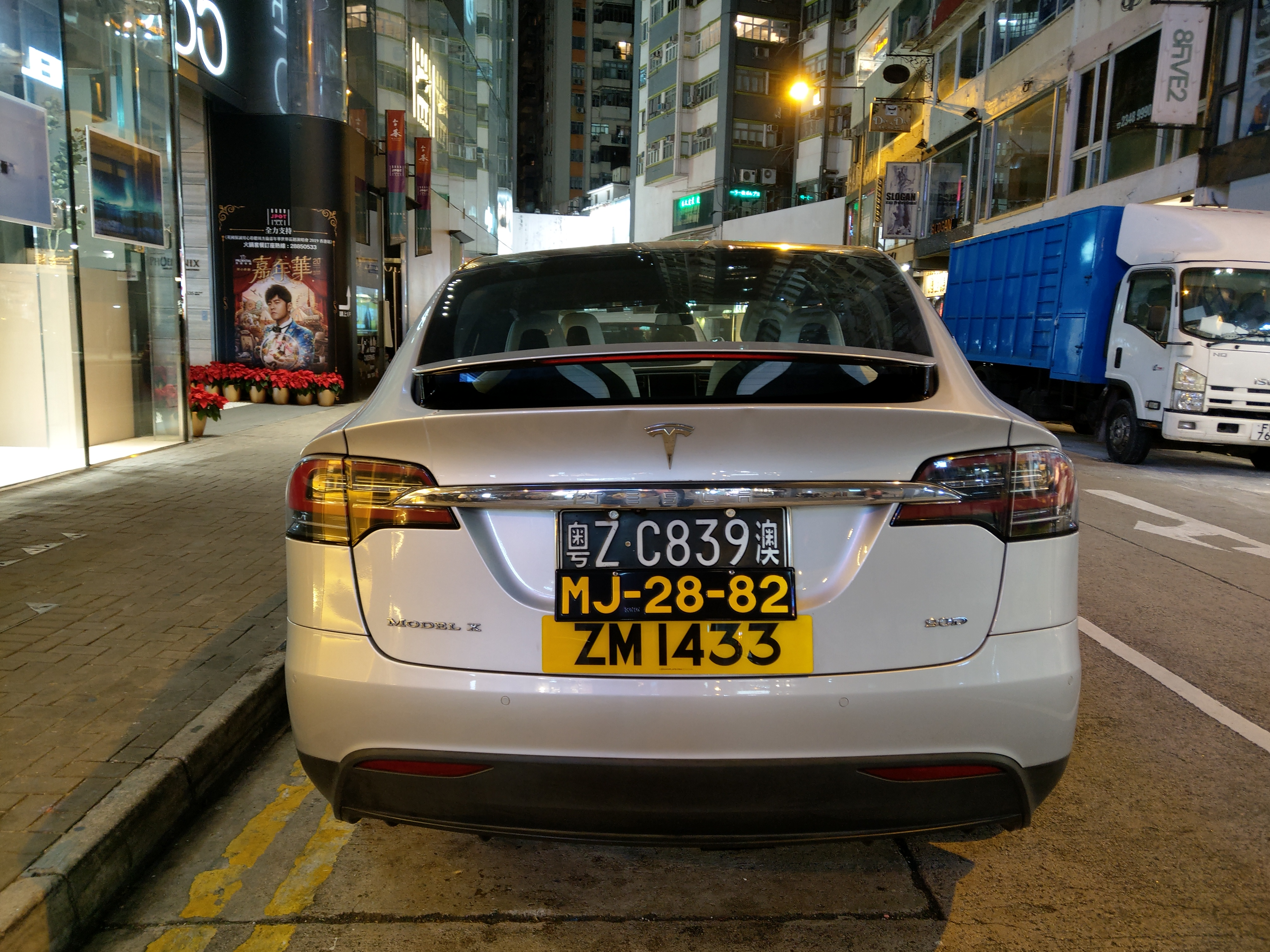
A Macau-registered Tesla vehicle with registration plates from mainland China, Macau, and Hong Kong

== Overview ==
Macanese registration plates follow the common system adopted for all the Portuguese overseas territories in the 1950s which, in turn, was based on the system introduced on Mainland Portugal in 1937.

All vehicles (with exception to two-wheelers) must display two plates: one at the front, and one at the rear. Depending on the width of the recess, either a rectangular or square plate is fitted – although a mix of both types is also possible. Two-wheeled vehicles are always fitted with a single square plate on the rear. Both front and rear plates are identical in design: white alphanumerics on a black background. In the case of commercial vehicles, yellow characters are used instead. Buses have been fitted with yellow-on-black plates since 2000.

== Format ==
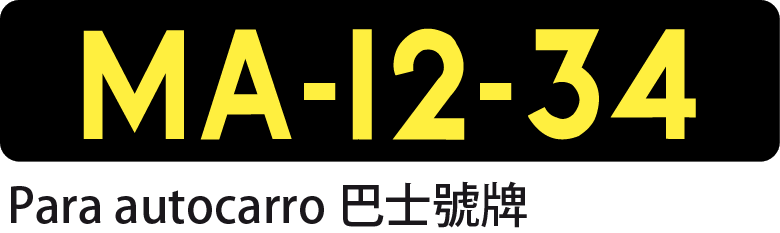
Macanese bus registration plate

The initial series simply consisted of the letter M (which stood for Macau) followed by a hyphen and up to three digits with no leading zeroes (e.g. M-183).

In the 1960s, the system was revised to include two pairs of double digits (leading zeroes were permitted). The first registration issued in this format was M-00-01.

Once M-99-99 had been reached in the 1980s, the system underwent another change to include a sequential serial letter after the 'M' prefix – the first registration issued in this format was MA-00-01. Registrations in the range MA-00-01 to MA-09-99 are reserved for government vehicles – e.g. MA-00-01 is allocated to the vehicle of the Chief Executive of Macau SAR.

As of October 2023, the current allocated prefix is AB.

=== Two-wheeled vehicles ===
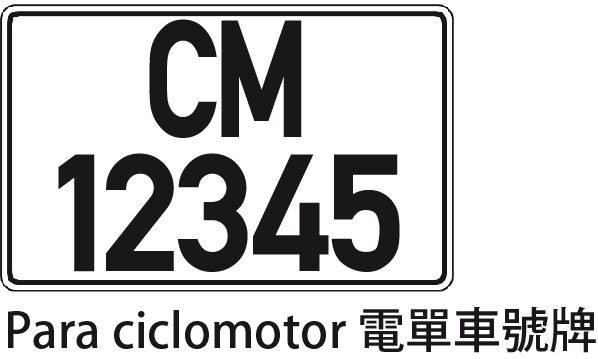
Macanese moped registration plate

Motorcycles whose engine capacity is greater than 51cc are fitted with a single, square registration plate from the same series as regular vehicles.

Mopeds, on the other hand, are furnished with plates which follow a unique format: CM-xdddd where CM stands for Ciclomotor" (the Portuguese word for moped), x is a digit between 1 and 9, and d is a digit in the range 0-9 (leading zeroes are not used). Unlike regular Macanese registration plates, these feature black characters on a white background.

=== Special plates ===
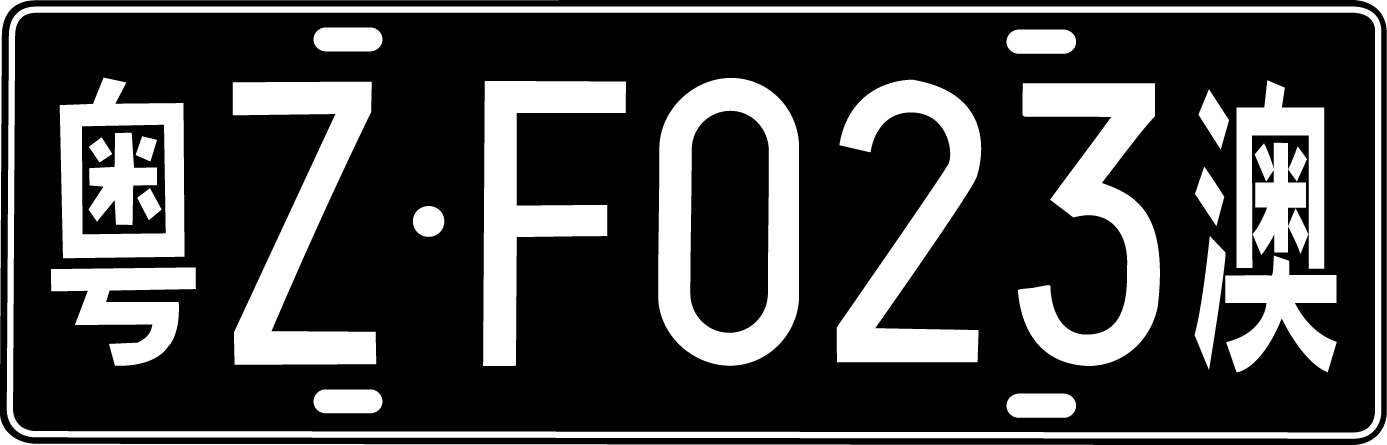
Mandatory supplement plate to be shown when Macau-registered vehicles enter Mainland China

- Plates with the EX (Experiência – the Portuguese word for trial) prefix are issued temporarily to vehicles which are pending formal examination and registration. These plates can have up to 4 digits, and feature white characters on a red background. They are issued exclusively by IAM.
- Plates with the ES (Especial – the Portuguese word for special) prefix are issued to car dealers, enabling them to use an unregistered vehicle on the public road. These plates are red-on-white, and can feature up to 3 digits without leading zeroes. They are also issued exclusively by IAM.
- Plates with the ZA (Zhù Ào 駐澳 – the Mandarin term for stationed in Macau) prefix are reserved for the People's Liberation Army in Macau. These plates are produced to Mainland Chinese standards, but retain the design of standard Macanese license plates.
- Plates with the T (Temporária – the Portuguese word for temporary) prefix are issued to vehicles registered outside the Macau SAR which can be driven on public roads under a temporary permit for import. These plates are yellow-on-black, and can feature up to 3 digits; they are issued by DSAT (Direcção dos Serviços para os Assuntos de Tráfego).
- Plates with the HK (Hong Kong) prefix are issued to vehicles registered in Hong Kong. They maintain the white-on-black colour scheme of standard Macanese license plates. Introduced in 2018, these plates are issued jointly by the Hong Kong and Macau SAR Governments and are regulated by a quota system, limiting allocation to vehicles owned by individuals or companies with business interests in Macau. Since their introduction, only 4,500 plates have been issued.

== Auction of registration marks ==
The DSAT will occasionally auction registration numbers which have special combinations that are considered to be lucky by the Chinese community. For example, "8" and "9" are regarded as "wealth" and "long life", respectively, since they have similar pronunciations in Cantonese. For this reason, registrations which feature multiple instances of 8 and/or 9, (e.g. MA-88-88, MA-99-99, MA-99-88, etc.) will normally be withheld for sale at auction. Marks featuring recurring digits (e.g. MA-11-11, MO-77-77, etc.) are also popular choices at auction.

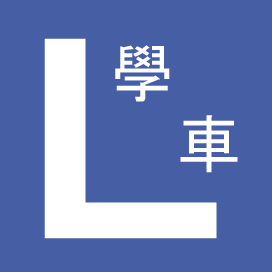
L-plate for learner drivers in Macau

== See also ==
- Vehicle registration plates of China
- Vehicle registration plates of Portugal
- Vehicle registration plates of Hong Kong
