= Vehicle registration plates of China =

People's Republic of China
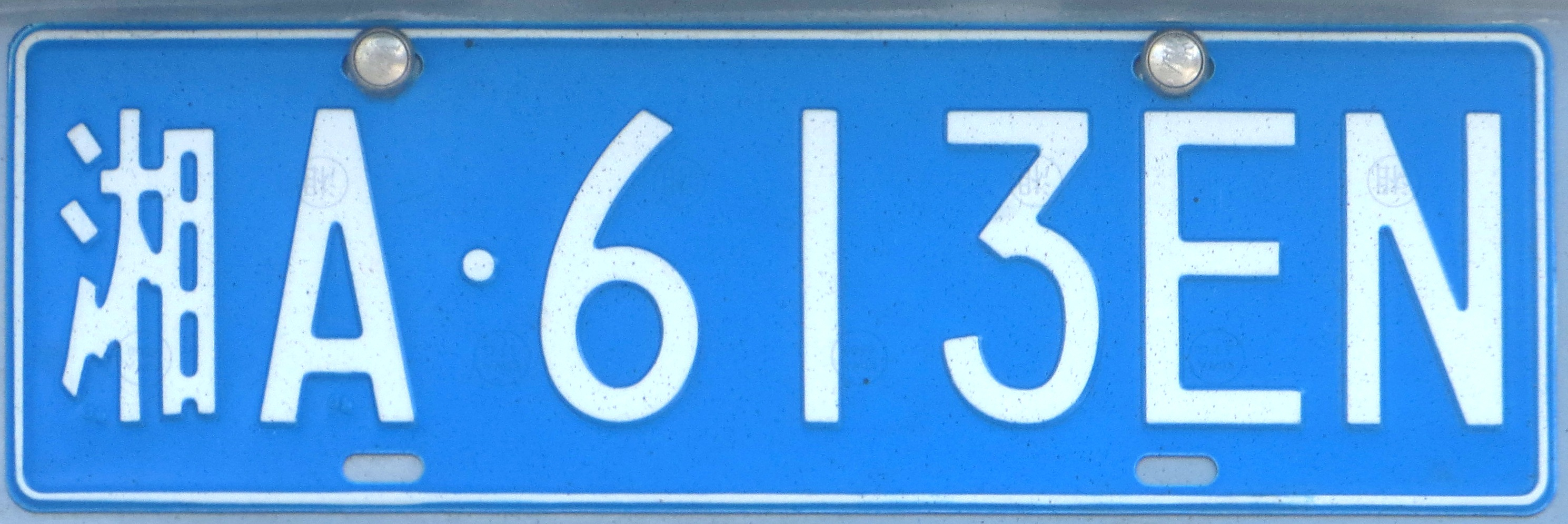
- Current regular legal standard number plate from the PRC, registered in Changsha, Hunan
- Country: China
- Country code: None

Current series
- Size: 440 mm × 140 mm 17.3 in × 5.5 in
- Serial format: Not standard
- Front plate: Required
- Rear plate: Required
- Colour (front): White on blue
- Colour (rear): White on blue

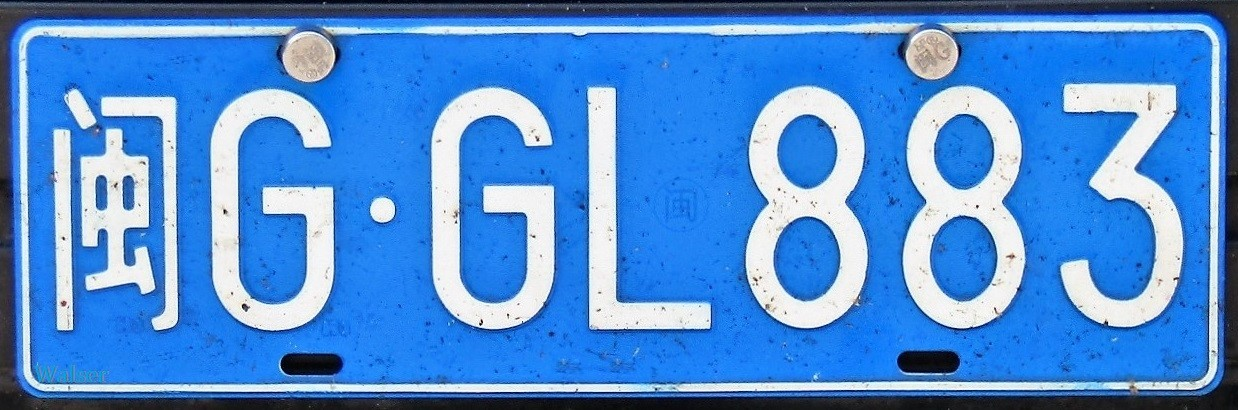
A registration plate of China, registered in Sanming, Fujian

Vehicle registration plates in China are mandatory metal or plastic plates attached to motor vehicles in mainland China for official identification purposes. The plates are issued by the local traffic management offices, which are sub-branches of local public security bureaus, under the rules of the Ministry of Public Security.

Hong Kong and Macau, both of which are special administrative regions of China, issue their own licence plates, a legacy of when they were under British and Portuguese administration, respectively. Vehicles from Hong Kong and Macau are required to apply for licence plates, usually from Guangdong province, to travel on roads in mainland China. Vehicles from mainland China have to apply for Hong Kong licence plates or Macau licence plates to enter those territories.

== History ==
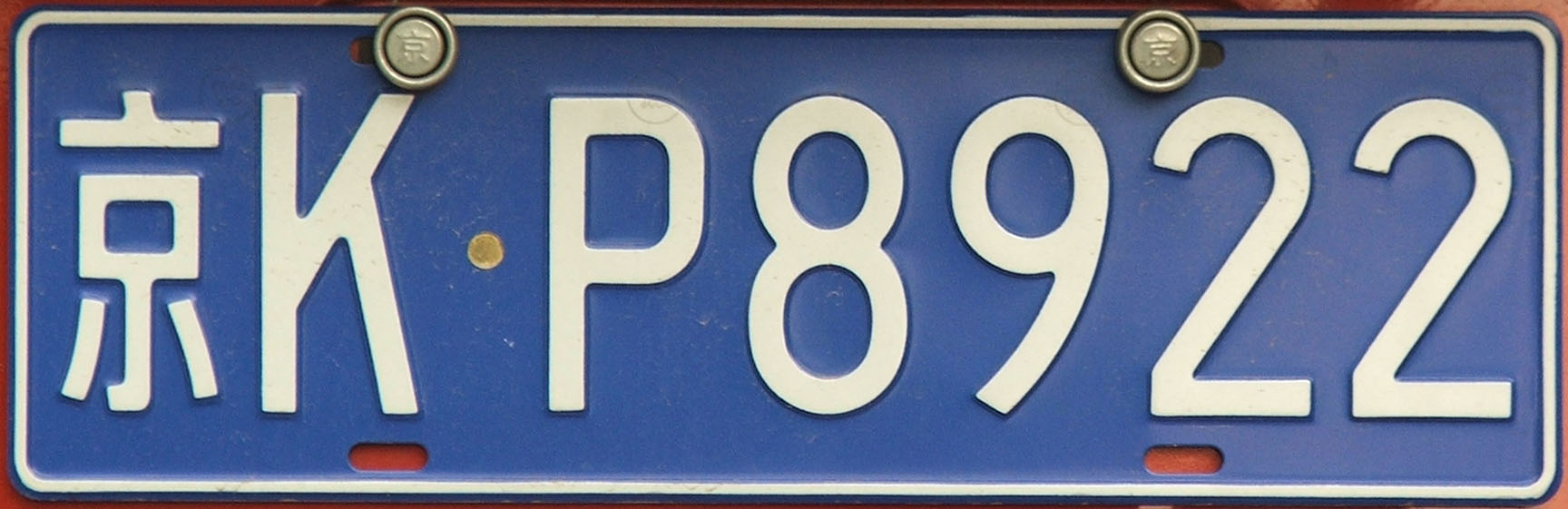
Blue PRC licence plates of the 1992 standard. This is an example of a vehicle registered to a Chinese citizen or entity.

Black PRC licence plates of the 1992 standard. This is an example of a vehicle registered to a foreign national, or a Chinese person who is not a citizen of mainland China

=== 1986-series plate ===
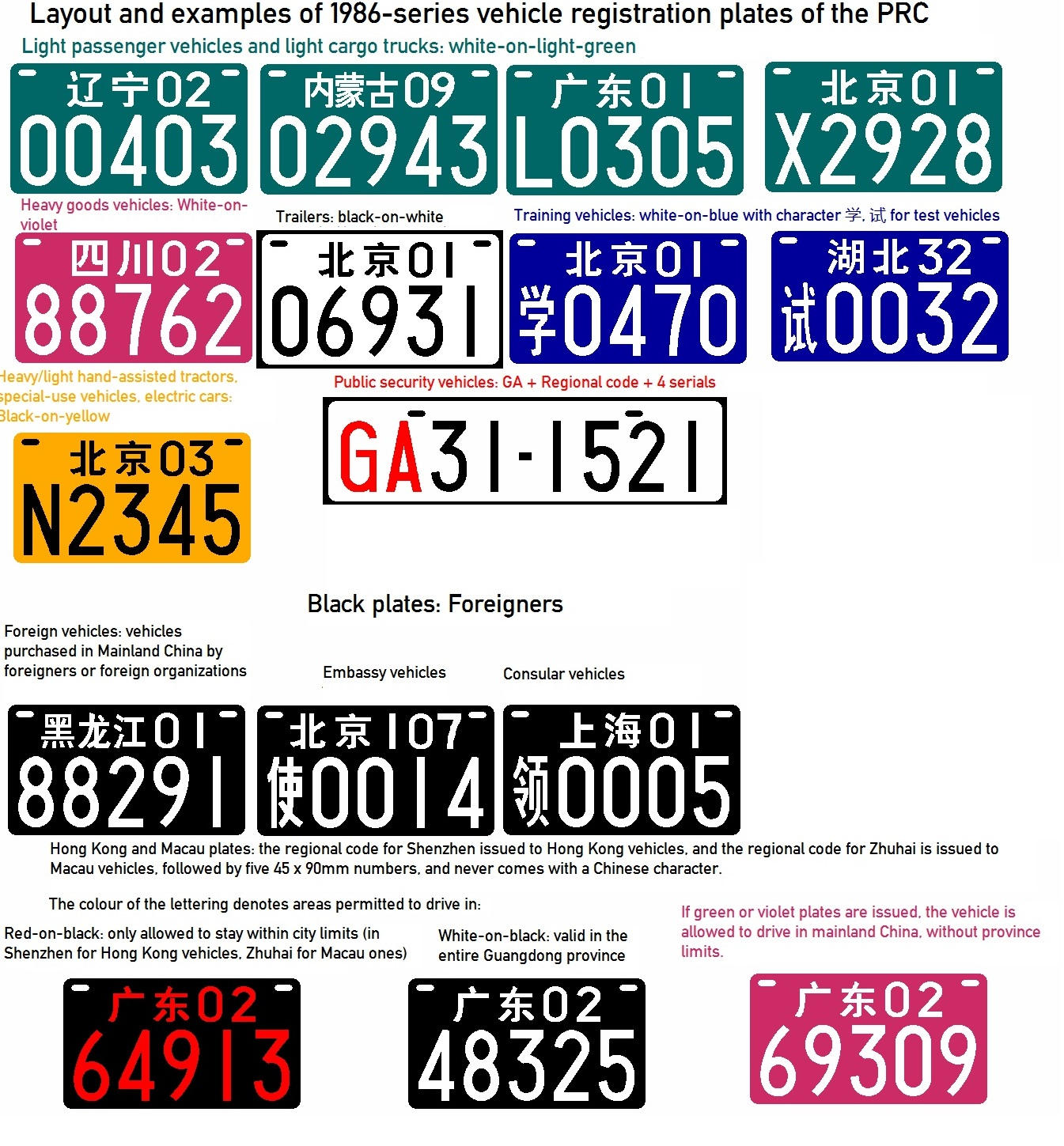
Layout and examples of 1986-series plates.

In July 1986, the 1986-series Plates were put into use. The layout and format for them are listed out as follows:

| Vehicle type | Colouring | Size (mm) | Notes |
|---|---|---|---|
| Light passenger/cargo vehicles | White on light green | 440 x 140 | May come with a letter replacing the first number. |
| Heavy goods vehicles | White on violet | 440 x 140 | |
| Heavy/light hand-assisted tractors, special-use vehicles, electric cars | Black on yellow | 440 x 140 | |
| Testing vehicles and training vehicles | White on blue | 440 x 140 | |
| Foreigner-owned vehicles | White on black | 440 x 140 | Red-on-black for limited-activity (i.e. only allowed to drive within city limits denoted by the regional code) |
| Trailers | Black on white | 440 x 140 | |
| Plate replacement permits | Red on white | 200 × 120 | |
| Temporary plates | Black on white | 200 × 120 | |
| Two/three-wheeled motorcycles | White on light green | 200 × 120 | |
| Light motorcycles | Violet on white | 200 × 120 | |

Hong Kong and Macau vehicles are issued with plates for Shenzhen (广东02) and Zhuhai (广东03), respectively. Red-on-black plate-bearing vehicles are only allowed to drive within said cities. White-on-black vehicles are permitted to drive within Guangdong province, while if the vehicles are issued with green or violet plates according to their types, they have no area limitations.

Public security vehicles (e.g. police) are issued with single-line plates with the format GARR-####, where the RR is the regional code, and the following numbers are the serial number, with the "GA" (abbreviation for 公安, gōng'ān, "Public security") in red.

The regional codes are as follows:

| Region | Code |
|---|---|
| Anhui | 安徽 |
| Beijing | 北京 |
| Fujian | 福建 |
| Gansu | 甘肃 |
| Guangdong | 广东 |
| Guangxi | 广西 |
| Guizhou | 贵州 |
| Hainan | 海南 |
| Hebei | 河北 |
| Heilongjiang | 黑龙江 |
| Henan | 河南 |
| Hubei | 湖北 |
| Hunan | 湖南 |
| Inner Mongolia | 内蒙古 |
| Jiangsu | 江苏 |
| Jiangxi | 江西 |
| Jilin | 吉林 |
| Liaoning | 辽宁 |
| Ningxia | 宁夏 |
| Qinghai | 青海 |
| Shaanxi | 陕西 |
| Shandong | 山东 |
| Shanghai | 上海 |
| Shanxi | 山西 |
| Sichuan | 四川 |
| Tianjin | 天津 |
| Tibet | 西藏 |
| Xinjiang | 新疆 |
| Yunnan | 云南 |
| Zhejiang | 浙江 |

Note: Chongqing was separated from Sichuan as a directly administered city in 1997, and the 1986-series standard was abolished in 1997 as well, therefore Public security vehicles in Chongqing bear the Sichuan code of GA51, instead of the later-introduced GA50.

1986-series plates are allowed to have the first number in the serial replaced by a letter with a special meaning, such as T for "taxi", Z for 自备车 (zìbèichē, "self-reserved vehicle"), G for 个体户 (gètǐhù, "entrepreneur").

== Current series types ==
=== Common types ===
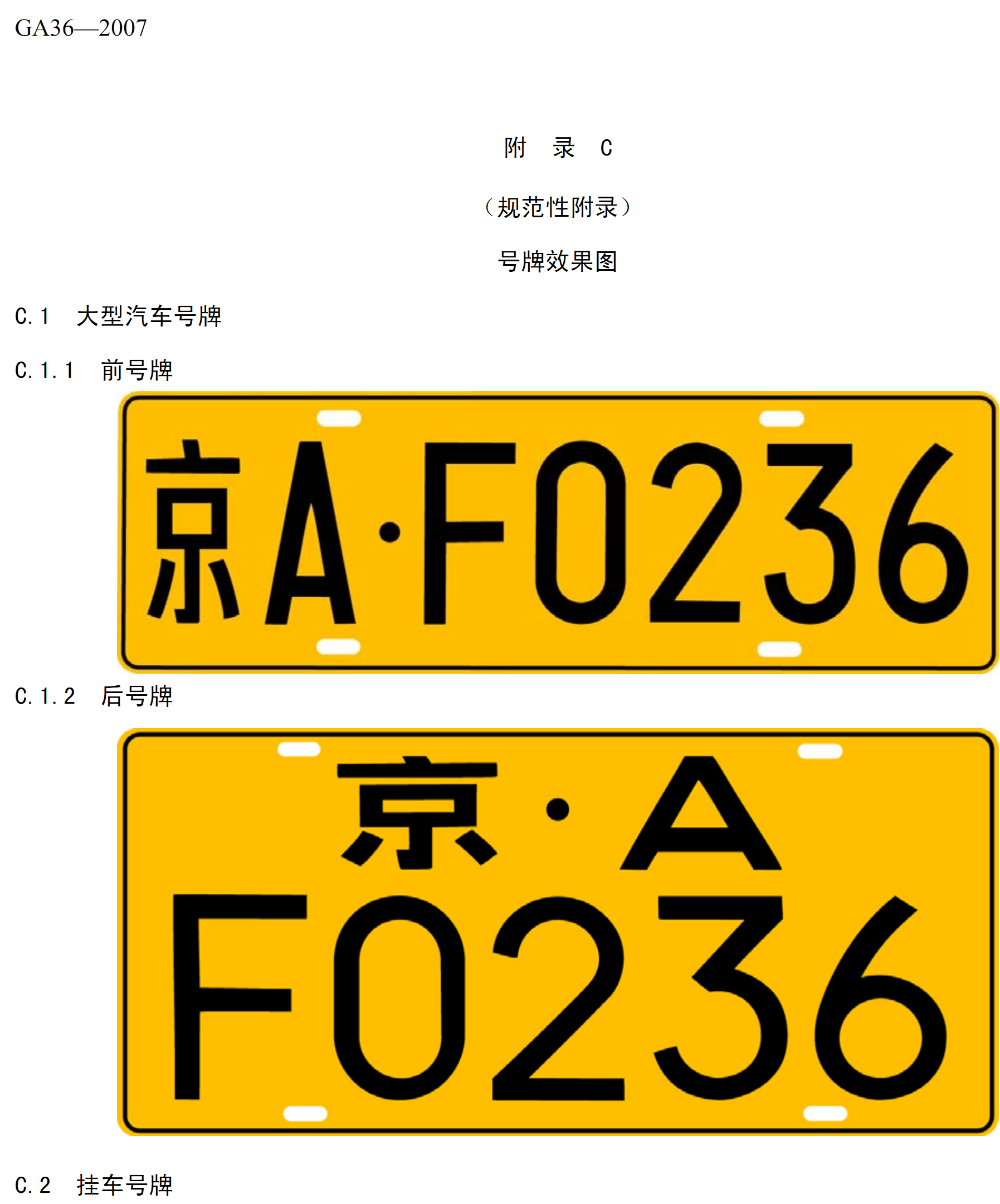
Schematic diagram of plates (1)

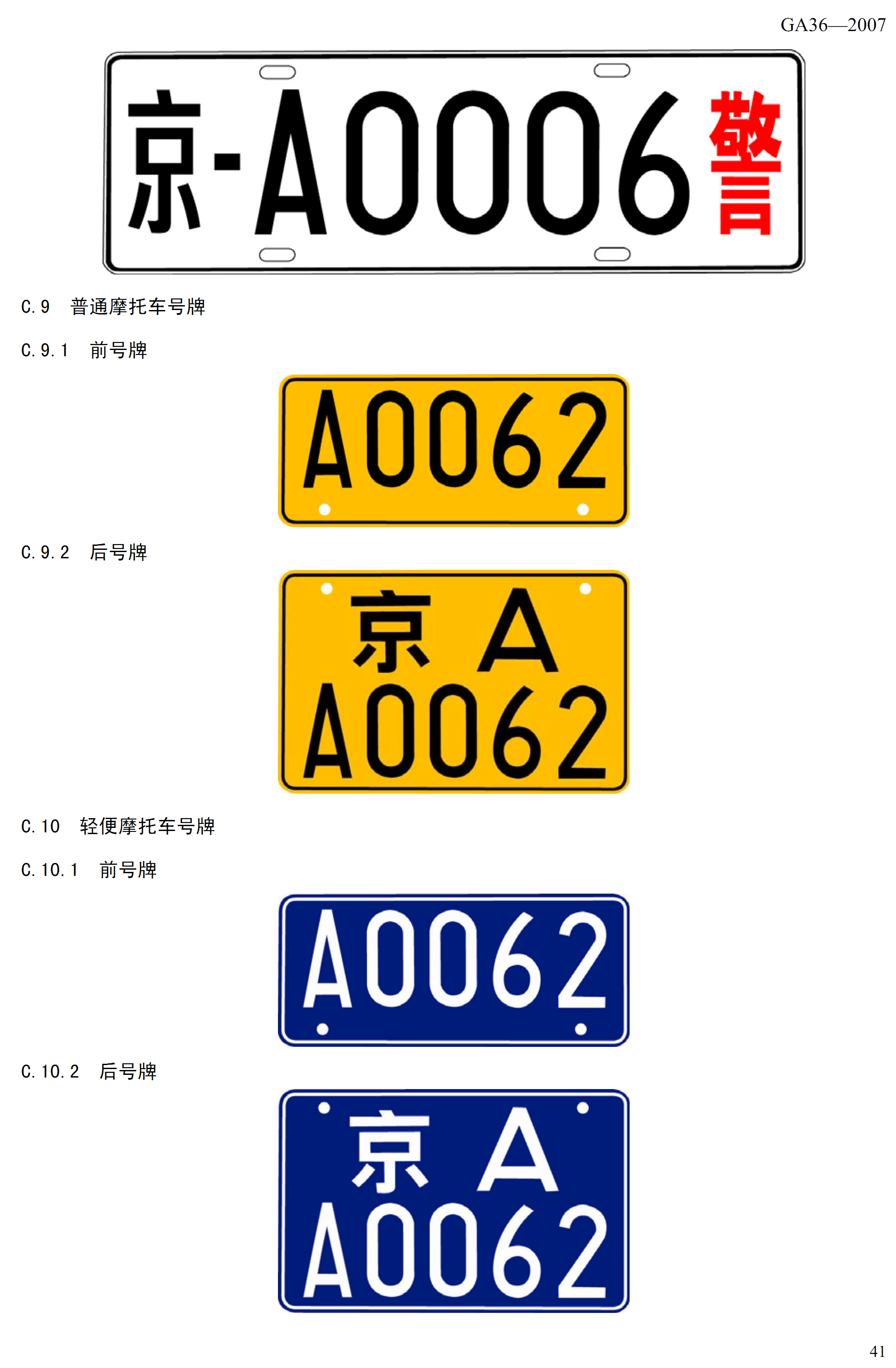
Schematic diagram of plates (4)

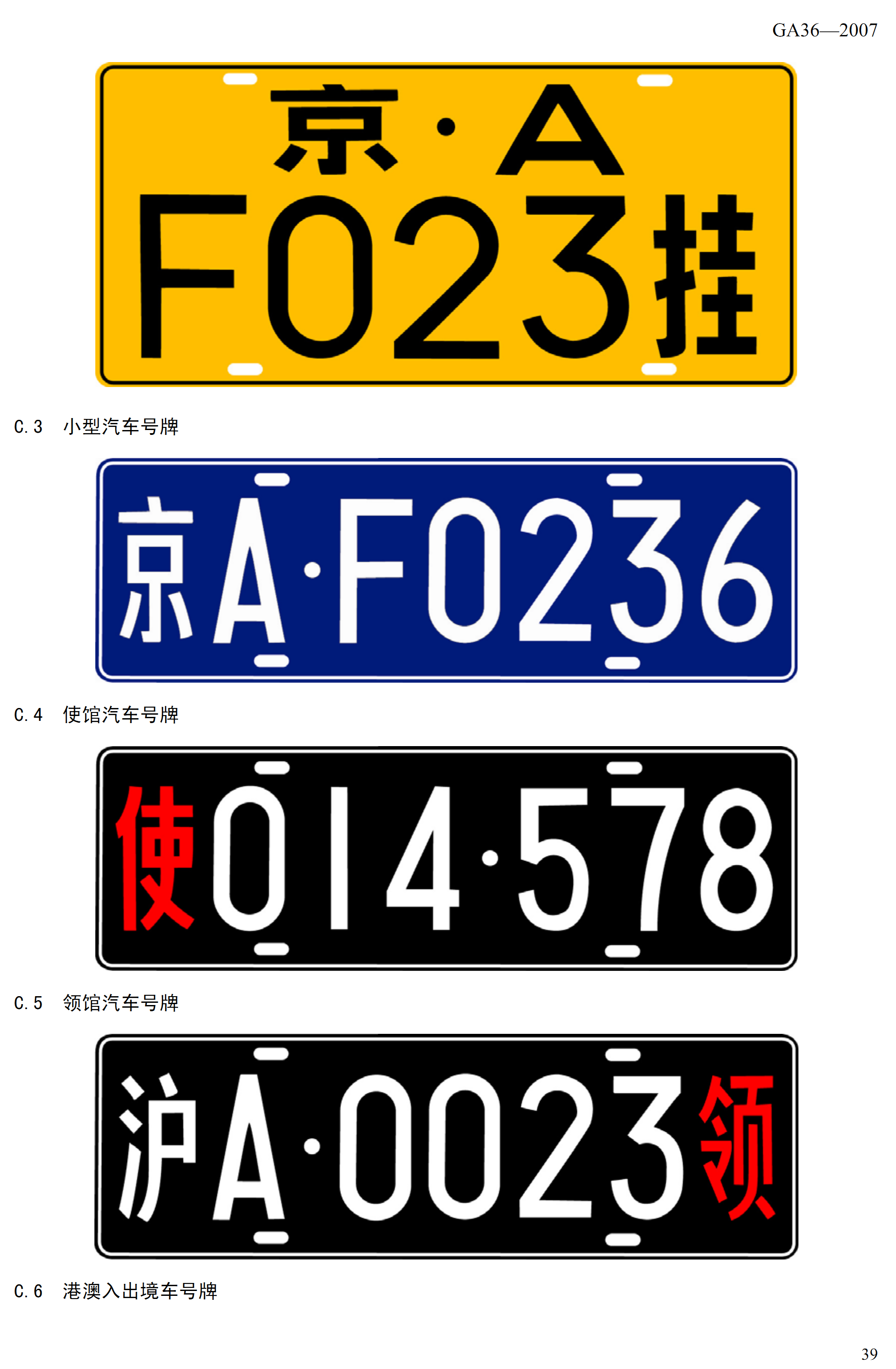
Schematic diagram of plates (2)

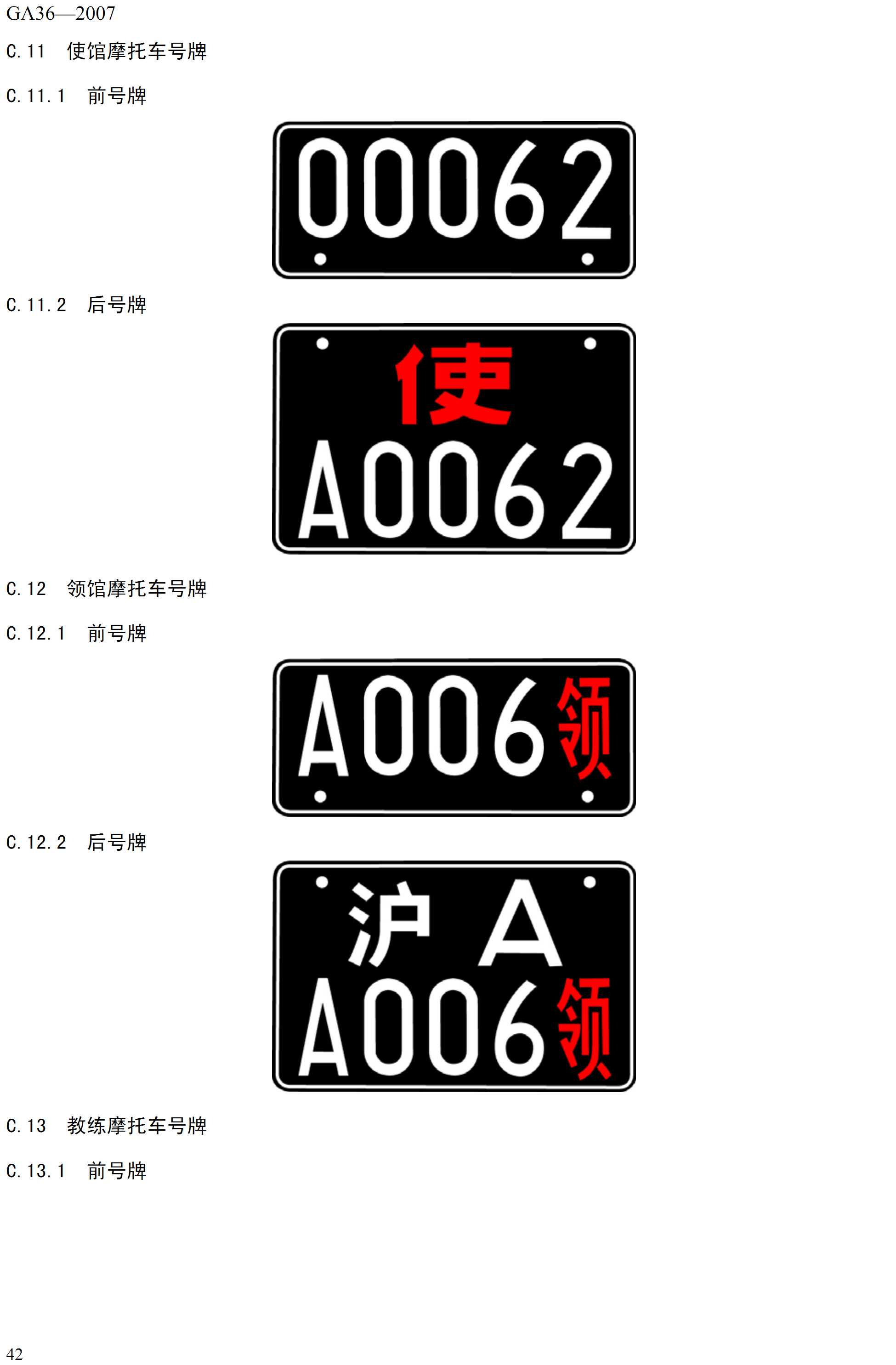
Schematic diagram of plates (5)

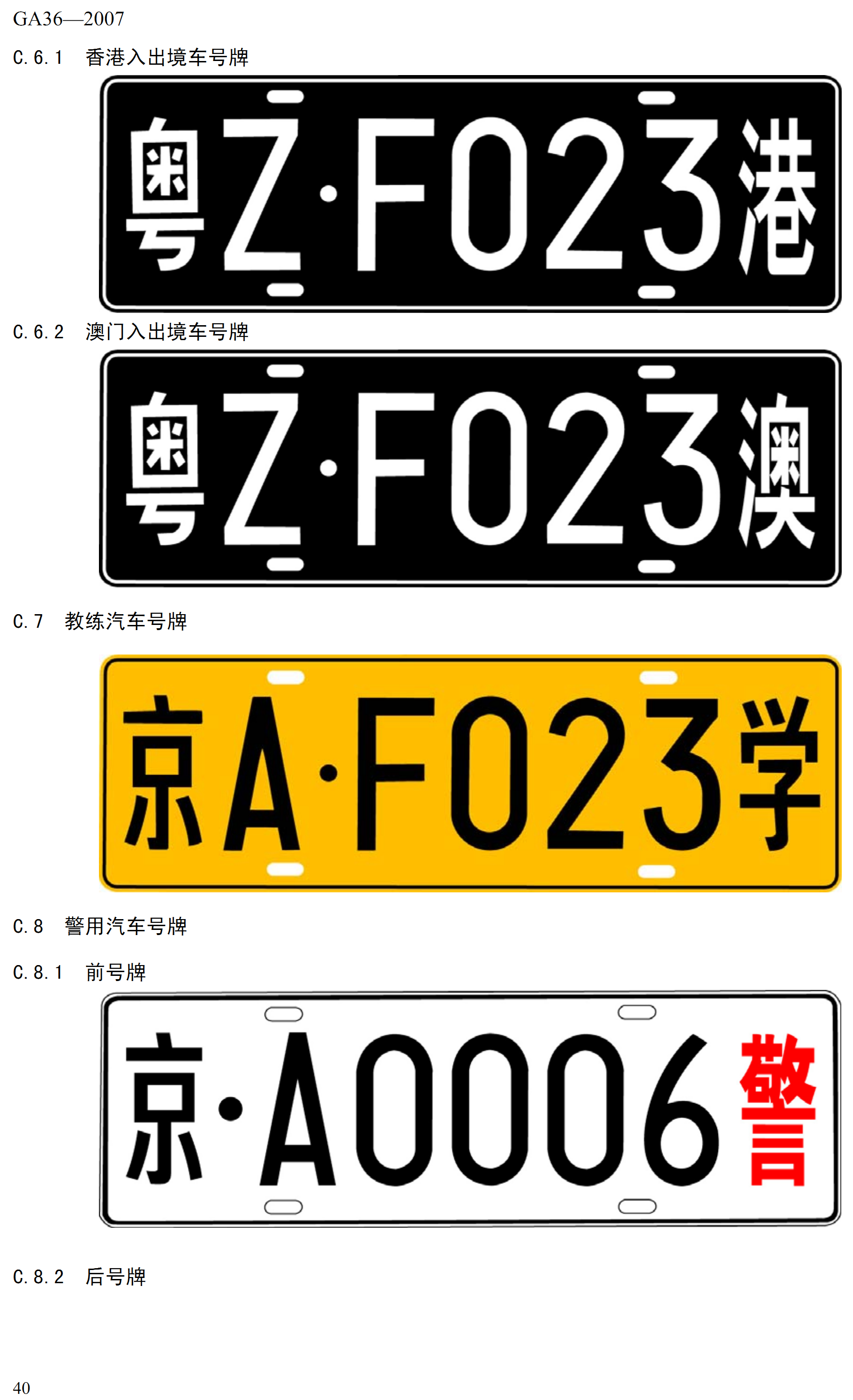
Schematic diagram of plates (3)

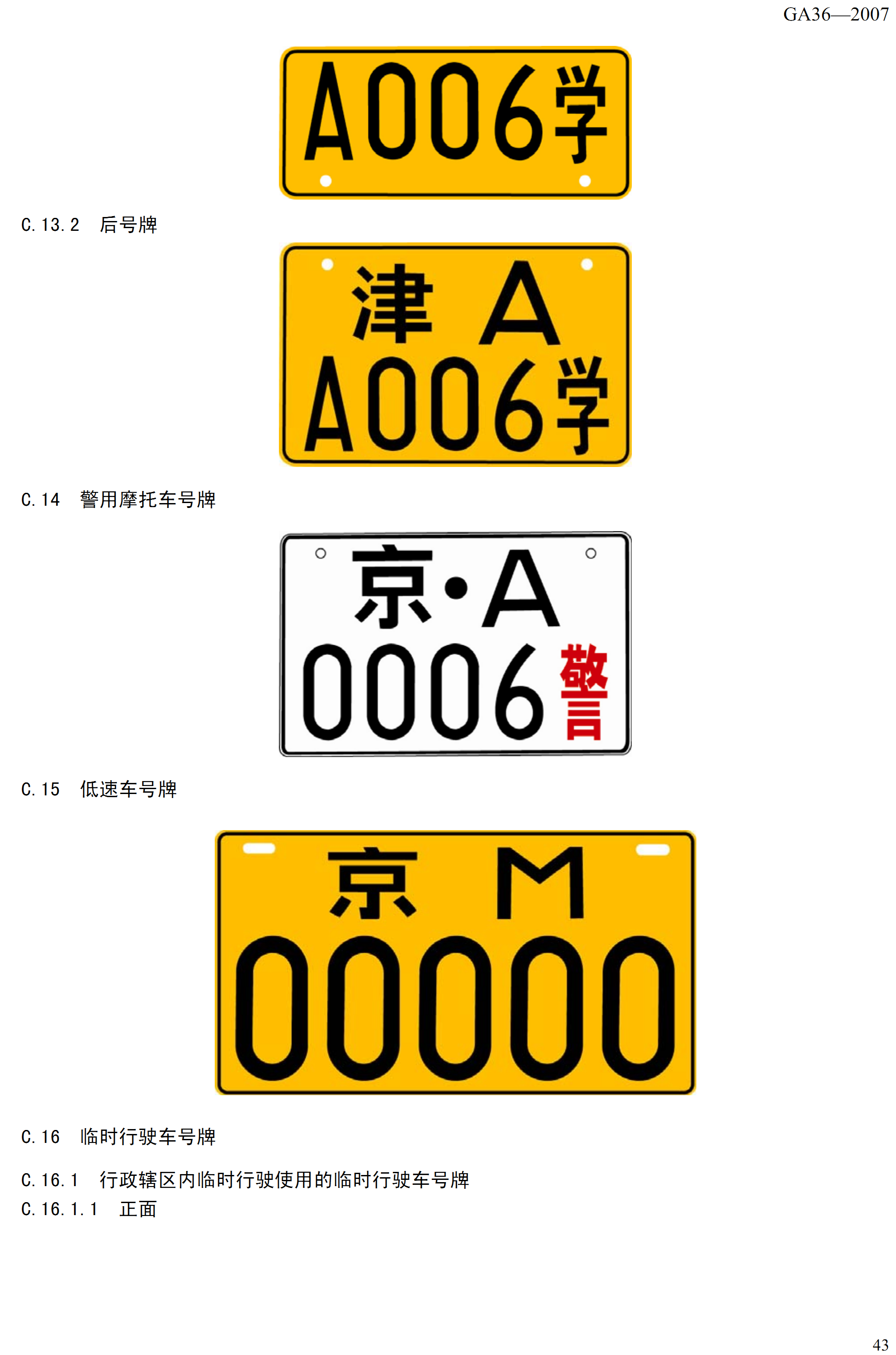
Schematic diagram of plates (6)

GA 36-1992

GA 36-2014

GA 36-2018

The current plates are of GA36-2014 standard, a further update of the original GA36-1992, made from GB/T 3880.1 and GB/T 3880.2-compliant aluminum material with a thickness of no less than 1.2mm (for rear plates for large vehicles and trailers) or 1.0mm (for any other non-temporary plates), or 200-220g dedicated watermarked paper with plastic sealing for automobiles and motorcycles entering the border on a temporary basis, or 125g white paper-card for temporary license plates. The plates accommodate a one-character provincial abbreviation, a letter of the Pinyin alphabet, and five numbers or letters of the alphabet (Ex. 沪A·12345; 京C·A1234; 苏A·1P234; 浙B·AB987; 粤Z·7C59港). Previously, all licence plates had used the five-number designation. As the number of motor vehicles grew, however, the number had to exceed what was the maximum previously allowable—90,000 or 100,000 vehicles. Therefore, there had become a need to insert Latin letters into the license plate to increase the number of possible combinations (for the full list of alphanumeric sequences permitted see below). This was first done in the bigger cities with only one prefix. Nanjing, for example, began the change with only the first number, which increased the number of possible combinations to 340,000 (with the exceptions of O & I, which cannot be printed without confusion with the numbers 0 & 1). Further changes allowed the first two places, or the second place alone on the plate to be letters, allowing 792,000 more combinations mathematically. More recently, cities have taken to having the third letter alone being a letter, the rest numbers.

Permitted alphanumeric combinations per GA36-2014 standard are listed in the table below. Should the number of combinations issued exceed 60% of the theoretical capacity of its type, the combination next in the list may be put into use after approval from the Vehicle Management Office of the provincial Public Security authority and reporting to the Vehicle Management Office of the Ministry of Public Security.

Note: Y and N in this table reflects whether or not this combination type may be used in registration plates with 4 or 5 places for digits/numbers, while D and L represents any permitted digit or letter respectively.

| Order | Combination | 4 places | 5 places |
|---|---|---|---|
| 1 | DDDDD | Y | Y |
| 2 | LDDDD | Y | Y |
| 3 | LLDDD | Y | Y |
| 4 | DLDDD | Y | Y |
| 5 | DDLDD | Y | Y |
| 6 | DDDLD | Y | Y |
| 7 | DDDDL | N | Y |
| 8 | LDDDL | N | Y |
| 9 | DDDLL | N | Y |
| 10 | LDLDD | Y | Y |
| 11 | DLLDD | Y | Y |
| 12 | LDDLD | Y | Y |
| 13 | DLDLD | Y | Y |
| 14 | DLDDL | N | Y |
| 15 | DDLLD | Y | Y |
| 16 | DDLDL | N | Y |

The numbers are produced at random, and are computer-generated at the issuing office. Numbers with a sequence of 6s, 8s, or 9s are usually considered to be lucky, therefore special sequences like "88888" or "86888" can be purchased through auction. A previous licence plate system, with a green background and the full name of the province in Chinese characters, actually had a sequential numbering order, and the numbering system was eventually beset with corruption.

License plates have different formats that are issued to different vehicles:

| Vehicle Type | Example | Coloring | Issued to |
|---|---|---|---|
| Small/Compact Vehicles | | White-on-Blue | Regular vehicles |
| Small/Compact Vehicles (New Energy) | 京A·D12345 京A·F12345 | Black lettering on Gradient green | Start with D (stands for 电) and A, B, C, E is for regular EV vehicles, start with F (stands for 非电) and G, H, J, K is for regular plug-in HEV or hydrogen fuel cell vehicles |
| Large Vehicles | (front) (rear) (trailer) | Black-on-yellow | Vehicles longer than 6m or certified to carry 20+ passengers |
| Large Vehicles (New Energy) | 京A·12345D 京A·12345F | Black lettering, yellow for the province code, green for the rest | End with A, B, C, D, E is for large EV vehicles, end with F, G, H, J, K is for large plug-in HEV or hydrogen fuel cell vehicles |
| Agricultural/Municipal vehicles (i.e. forbidden to leave city territory) | 京01-00001 北京A-00001 连港·A0018 民航A·A0125 | White-on-green | Mainly agricultural vehicles. Vehicles operating in transport hubs (e.g. airports, ports) receive the "民航"(civil aviation) (for operation in airports) or "X港" (port X) (for operation in seaports, where X is the name of the port) instead of the Chinese character and the first pair of digits. |
| Coach cars | | Black-on-yellow | Cars belonging to driving schools |
| Test car | 京A·0001试 | Black-on-yellow | |
| Temporary license (intra-province) | | Black on patterned light blue (paper) | Cars eligible for on-road driving but have not received a license plate yet |
| Temporary license (cross-province) | | Black on patterned brown (paper) | |
| Prototypes | 沪A·1234超 | Black on patterned light blue (paper) | |
| Foreigner-owned (Discontinued) | 京A·10000 | White-on-Black | Cars belonging to foreigners, joint-stock companies, foreign companies and diplomatic staff. |
| Small Motorcycles (50cc or below) | 54321 (Front) (discontinued per GA36-2014 standard) 沪 · C 54321 (Rear) | White-on-Blue | |
| Large Motorcycles (Above 50cc) | Same as above | Black-on-yellow | |
| Foreigner-owned motorcycle | Same as above | White on black | Discontinued from October 2007 |

Since October 2007, black plates are no longer issued for vehicles belonging to foreigners, as this was "deemed discriminatory" and instead standard looking blue plates are now issued. However, foreigners still are issued a separate dedicated letter/number sequence to denote that they are a foreign owned/registered vehicle—e.g. in Beijing, the foreign owned plates are in the 京A·#####, 京L·B####, and 京L·C#### sequence. The black plates are still issued to those who registered in both mainland China and Hong Kong or Macau, specifically in Guangdong province, which are in the sequence of 粤Z·####港/澳.

Registration combinations of written-off vehicles may be "recycled", or used again on a different vehicle only after 6 months from the write-off according to relevant regulations, but as a matter of fact, certain serials of number like 京A·##### in Beijing is not available for general public once recycled for unspecified reasons. In 2015, a former Commissioner of Beijing Traffic Management Bureau, the traffic branch of Beijing Municipal Public Safety Bureau, was sentenced for life, having been found guilty of corruption relating to fraud in issuing these licence plate combinations.

=== People's Police, PAP, and PLA ===
Licence plates for the People's Police, People's Armed Police (PAP), and People's Liberation Army (PLA) are in a white background, with red and black text.

The People's Police plates have a designated format of X·LLNNN警 (X is the geographical abbreviation, N is a digit, and L is either a digit or a letter; "警" means police and is coloured red, but the separator dot is no longer a circle, rather, a dash). These plates are issued to traffic police, some patrol vehicles, court, and procuratorate vehicles.

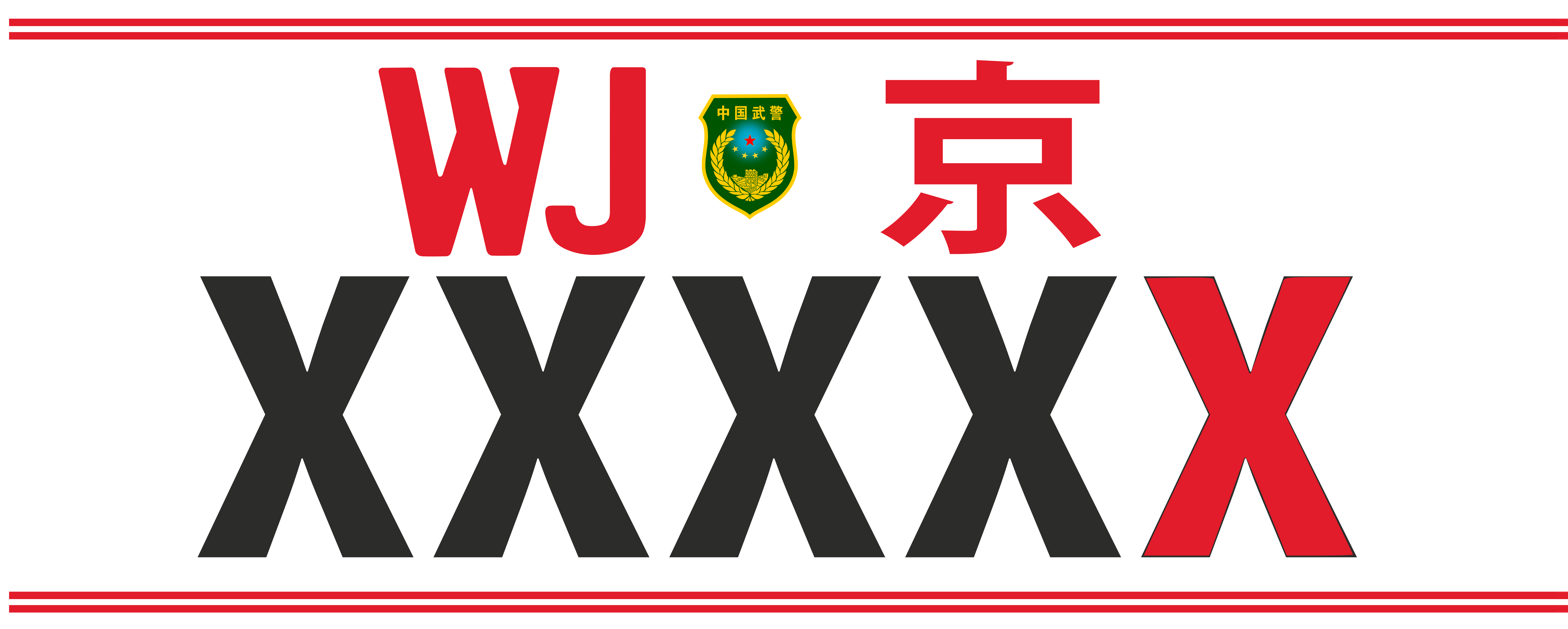
Sample of a 2012 series CAPF plates (Replaced by the 2019 series as of Oct 2019)

The plates’ combination of the People's Armed Police ("武警") begins with the pinyin wujing abbreviation WJ.

The 2012 series of PAP vehicle registration plates is in the WJ P NNNNL pattern, where the stands for a Chinese character i.e. 京 for Beijing, serving as the provincial identifier, and the L denotes the first letter in pinyin of the branch of service. e.g. WJ沪 1234X = a vehicle for firefighting use in Shanghai

The 2004 series use the format WJNN-NNNNN.

The first two small letters behind the WJ are area prefixes:

- WJ01-NNNNN. = Headquarters
- WJ31-NNNNN. = Beijing
- WJ14-NNNNN. = Shandong
- WJ21-NNNNN. = Hainan

The Alphabet Numeral behind the area prefix shows the section of the Armed police:

- WJ01-JNNNN. = Official Guards, Official and Diplomatic Escorts
- WJ01-BNNNN. = Border Police
- WJ01-XNNNN. = Firefighter (Fire Department)
- WJ01-1NNNN. = Headquarters

PLA vehicles previously had plates using a code of heavenly stems in red. After reorganization in 2004, again in 2013 military vehicles now use a more organized prefix. These licence plates use the format XL·NNNNN (X is a prefix, L is a letter).

The People's Liberation Army vehicle prefixes 2013:

Military vehicles can be identified by having a red letter from the alphabet *V

- V PLA Central Military Commission
- K PLA Air Force
- H PLA Navy
- B PLA Beijing Military
- VA PLA Central Military Commission
- VB PLA Political Works
- VC PLA Logistical Support
- VD PLA Equipment Development

The People's Liberation Army vehicle prefixes 2004:

- "军" (Jūn; "Military")

Vehicles of the Central Military Commission
Vehicles of the Headquarters of People's Liberation Army
Vehicles of the PLA's units at Army-Grade or above. Deputy-Military-Region-Grade, Military-Region-Grade.

The Ground Force of PLA vehicle of the various military regions have their own prefixes:

- "北" (Beǐ) Vehicles of the Beijing Military Region of Ground Force)
- "沈" (Shěn); Vehicles of the Shenyang Military Region of Ground Force)
- "兰" (Lán); Vehicles of the Lanzhou Military Region of Ground Force)
- "成" (Chéng); Vehicles of the Chengdu Military Region of Ground Force)
- "济" (Jǐ); Vehicles of the Jinan Military Region of Ground Force)
- "南" (Nán); Vehicles of the Nanjing Military Region of Ground Force)
- "广" (Guǎng); Vehicles of the Guangzhou Military Region of Ground Force)

The Navy of PLA vehicle prefixes:

- "海" (Haǐ)

The Air Force of PLA vehicle prefixes:

- "空" (Kōng)

Vehicles with government or military plates are not subject to the Road Traffic Safety Law of the People's Republic of China (中华人民共和国道路交通安全法); they may run red lights, drive in the wrong direction or weave in and out of traffic. Communist party officials and People's Liberation Army members are also exempt from paying road tolls and adhering to parking regulations. According to Xinhua News Agency, "police officers are also reluctant to pull over drivers of military vehicles even if the drivers are breaking the law", which is the reason behind an emerging trend in which individuals purchase counterfeit military registration plates to avoid being pulled over by police and to avoid road fees. Xinhua News Agency reported in 2008 that since July 2006, the government has confiscated over 4,000 fake military vehicles and 6,300 fake plates and has apprehended over 5,000 people belonging to criminal gangs; under Chinese law, those caught driving under fake registration plates are fined up to 2,000 RMB, and counterfeiters can be jailed for up to three years.

=== Motorcycles ===
Motorcycle licence plates are nearly the same as that for ordinary vehicles, but are less in length and look more like an elongated square than a banner-like rectangle. There are two lines of text (province code and letter on the top, numbers on the bottom).

For qingqi or low-powered motorbikes, blue licence plates are issued throughout.

=== Embassies and consulates ===
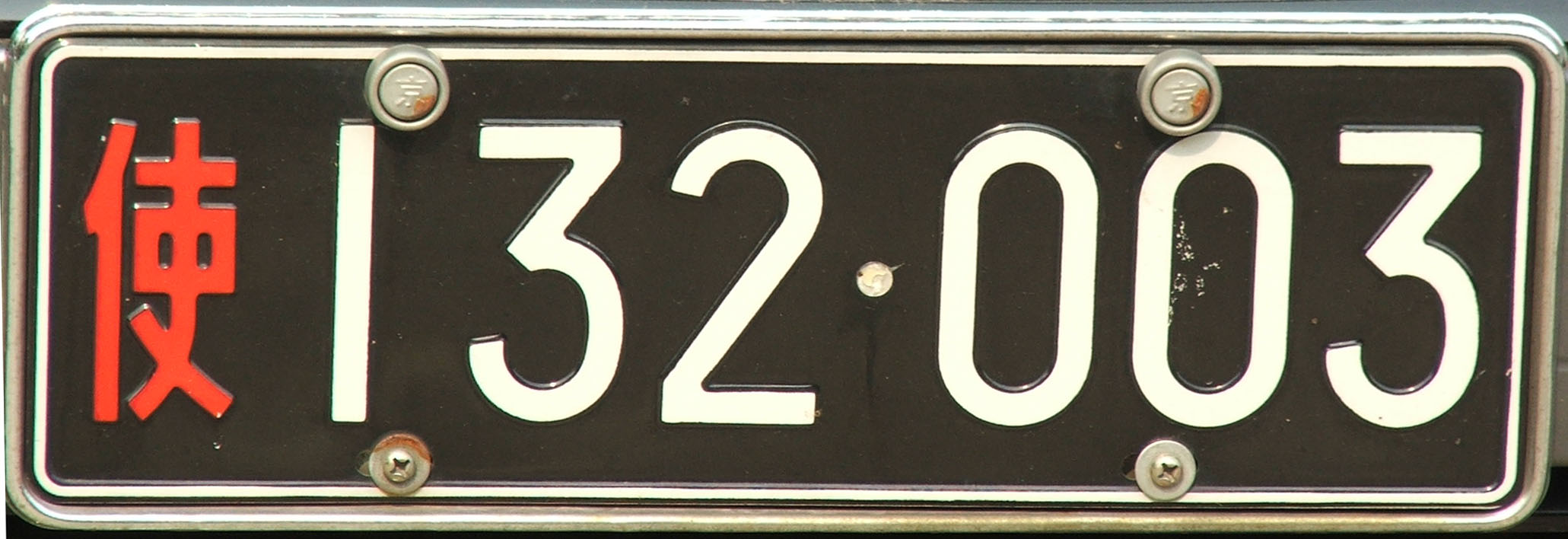
Pre-2017 Chinese diplomatic license plate. The first code is the character: 使 (shǐ, literally "envoy"), representing the embassy. The code 132 represents the Czech Republic, but it may not be due to Beijing having codes unreleased due to privacy reasons.

Since 2017, embassy and consulate vehicles have their own license plate with six white numbers followed by a single character denoting its diplomatic status, all on a black background (following the foreigner plate standard, as previously mentioned). Embassies use 使 (shǐ, from 使馆 meaning 'embassy') and are used only in Beijing. Consulates use 领 (lǐng, from 领事馆 meaning 'consulate') and are used for representations outside Beijing. Numbers on embassy plates are formatted so that the first three digits represent the foreign entity/organization the vehicle is registered to while the last three digits are sequential, where 001 is (generally) the Ambassador's car, for example: 224·001使 is the car used by the American Ambassador. Numbers 002 to 005 are usually reserved for official use and therefore enjoy the comfort of the highest levels of diplomatic immunity.

In order to protect the privacy of foreign diplomats, the government does not release information on embassy vehicles, so it is possible that some data in the list of plate prefixes below may not be correct.

Diplomatic Codes
| 101 - Afghanistan; 102 - Albania; 103 - Algeria; 104 - Angola; 105 - Argentina; 106 - Australia; 107 - Austria; 108 - Azerbaijan; 109 - Bahrain; 110 - Bangladesh; 111 - Belarus; 112 - Belgium; 113 - Benin; 114 - Bolivia; 115 - Botswana; 116 - Brazil; 117 - Brunei; 118 - Bulgaria; 119 - Burkina Faso; 120 - Burundi; 121 - Cambodia; 122 - Cameroon; 123 - Canada; 124 - Chad; 125 - Chile; 126 - Colombia; 127 - Congo; 128 - Ivory Coast; 129 - Croatia; 130 - Cuba; 131 - Cyprus; 132 - Czech Republic; 133 - North Korea; 134 - Denmark; 135 - East Timor; 136 - Ecuador; 137 - Egypt; 138 - Equatorial Guinea; 139 - Eritrea; 140 - Ethiopia; 141 - Fiji; 142 - Finland; 143 - France; 144 - Gabon; 145 - Germany; 146 - Ghana; 147 - Greece; 148 - Guinea; 149 - Guyana; 150 - Hungary; 151 - Iceland; 152 - India; 153 - Indonesia; 154 - Iran; 155 - Iraq; 156 - Ireland; 157 - Israel; 158 - Italy; 160 - Jordan; 161 - Kazakhstan; 162 - Kenya; 163 - Kiribati; 164 - Kuwait; 165 - Kyrgyzstan | 166 - Laos; 167 - Lebanon; 168 - Libya; 169 - Luxembourg; 170 - Madagascar; 171 - Malaysia; 172 - Mali; 173 - Malta; 174 - Marshall Islands; 175 - Mauritania; 176 - Mexico; 177 - Micronesia; 178 - Mongolia; 179 - Morocco; 180 - Mozambique; 181 - Myanmar; 182 - Nepal; 183 - Netherlands; 184 - New Zealand; 185 - Nigeria; 186 - Norway; 187 - Oman; 188 - Pakistan; 189 - Palestine; 190 - Papua New Guinea; 191 - Peru; 192 - Philippines; 193 - Poland; 194 - Portugal; 195 - Qatar; 196 - South Korea; 197 - Romania; 198 - Russia; 199 - Rwanda; 200 - Saudi Arabia; 201 - Senegal; 202 - Seychelles; 203 - Sierra Leone; 204 - Singapore; 205 - Slovakia; 206 - Slovenia; 207 - Somalia; 208 - South Africa; 209 - Spain; 210 - Sri Lanka; 211 - Sudan; 212 - Sweden; 213 - Switzerland; 214 - Syria; 215 - Tanzania; 216 - Thailand; 217 - Togo; 218 - Tunisia; 219 - Turkey; 220 - Uganda; 221 - Ukraine; 222 - United Arab Emirates; 223 - United Kingdom; 224 - United States; 225 - Uruguay; 226 - Vanuatu; 227 - Venezuela; 228 - Vietnam; 229 - Yemen; 230 - Serbia; 231 - Democratic Republic of the Congo; 232 - Zambia | 233 - São Tomé and Príncipe; 234 - North Macedonia; 235 - Japan; 236 - Lesotho; 237 - Uzbekistan; 238 - Turkmenistan; 239 - Georgia; 240 - Namibia; 241 - Lithuania; 242 - Moldova; 243 - Mauritius; 244 - Panama; 245 - Niger; 246 - Tajikistan; 247 - Antigua and Barbuda; 248 - Armenia; 249 - Suriname; 250 - Zimbabwe; 251 - Estonia; 252 - Haiti; 253 - Latvia; 254 - Bosnia and Herzegovina; 255 - Guinea-Bissau; 256 - Cape Verde; 257 - Djibouti; 258 - Central African Republic; 260 - Dominica; 261 - Liberia; 262 - Jamaica; 263 - Grenada; 264 - Maldives; 265 - Costa Rica; 266 - Malawi; 267 - Bahamas; 268 - Comoros; 269 - Montenegro; 270 - Tonga; 271 - South Sudan; 272 - Barbados; 273 - Gambia; 274 - El Salvador; 275 - Dominican Republic; 276 - Solomon Islands; 277 - Samoa; 278 - Nicaragua; 279 - Honduras; 159 - Shanghai Cooperation Organisation; 259 - Pacific Islands Forum; 300 - European Union; 301 - Arab League; 302 - (United Nations) UN Development Programme; 303 - (United Nations) UN Food and Agriculture Organization; 304 - (United Nations) UN Population Fund; 305 - (United Nations) UN World Food Programme; 306 - (United Nations) UN Children's Fund; 307 - (United Nations) UN World Health Organization; 308 - (United Nations) UN Educational, Scientific and Cultural Organization; 309 - (United Nations) UN International Labour Organization; 310 - World Bank; 311 - (United Nations) UN High Commissioner for Refugees; 313 - International Monetary Fund; 314 - International Finance Corporation; 316 - (United Nations) UN Industrial Development Organization; 317 - Asia Development Bank; 318 - Red Cross; 319 - (United Nations) UN Asian and Pacific Centre for Agricultural Engineering and Machinery; 321 - (United Nations) UN Environment Programme |

=== Other types ===
Vehicles for use in automobile tests, vehicles for use in driving schools (examination and test-driving), and vehicles at airports all have their own separate licence plates.

For automobile tests, licence plates consist of black characters on a yellow background with the suffix shi (试 short in Chinese for ce shi or test). For driving schools, different plates apply for test-drive vehicles (jiaolian che) and examination vehicles (kaoshi che).

Airports have licence plates with white characters on a green background with the designation min hang (民航; 'Civilian Air Transportation'). This shade of green is slightly lighter than the variant used on normal licence plates prior to 1992. Some vehicles belonging to airports that operate in its vicinity (rather than inside its perimeters) have dark-green lettering on a white background. These plates, unlike others, permit the use of letter I (as in the SPIA-A00 series used in Shanghai Pudong International Airport)

Sometimes, to avoid privacy invasion, modern Chinese TV show series are set in fictitious locations. Vehicles featured in these shows often carry registration plates with non-valid provincial abbreviations and/or invalid typefaces.

=== Cross-border with Hong Kong and Macau ===
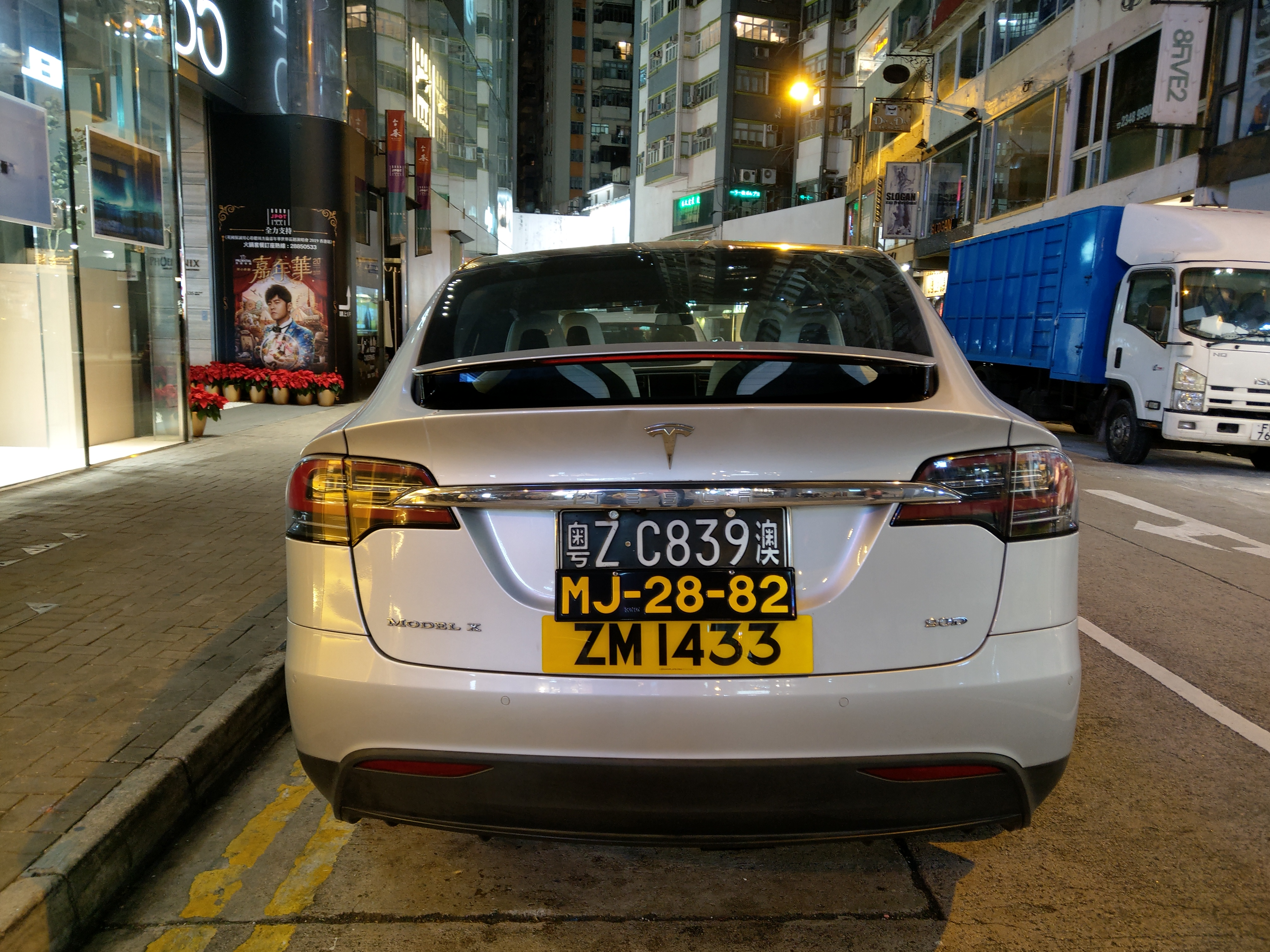
A Macau-registered Tesla vehicle with license plates from mainland China, Macau, and Hong Kong

Licence plates with a black background and the character 港 or 澳 in place of the last number are used for Hong Kong and Macau vehicles, respectively, when they engage in cross-border traffic to and from mainland China. These plates often exist side by side with a local Hong Kong or Macau licence plates on the same car. See the section on Guangdong license plates.

=== Interim licence plates ===
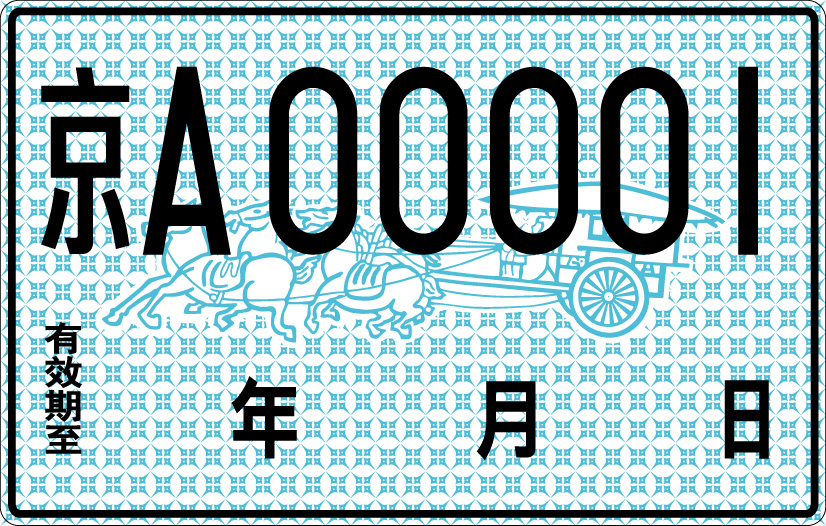
Front of Interim licence plate (drive in an administrative area only)

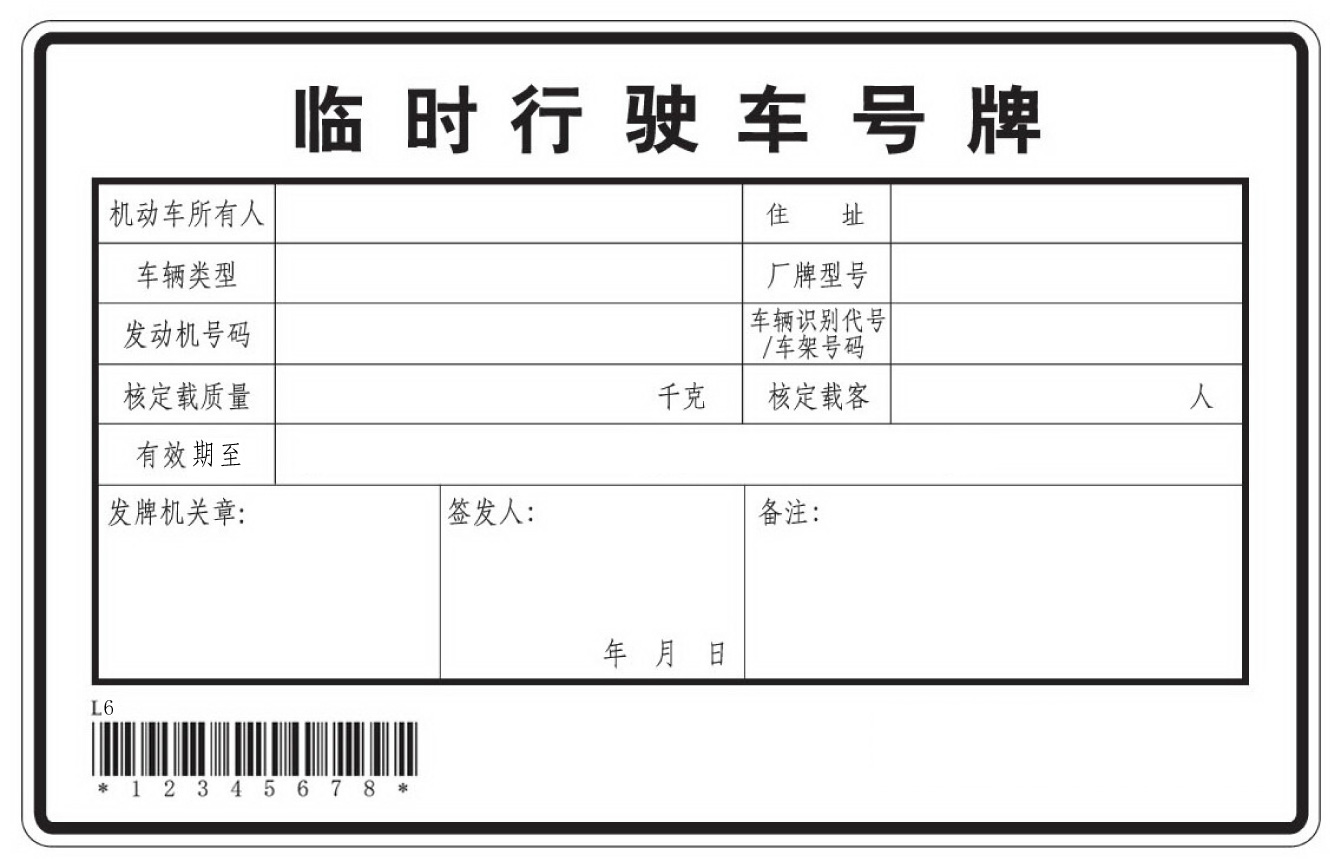
Back of Interim licence plate (drive in an administrative area only)

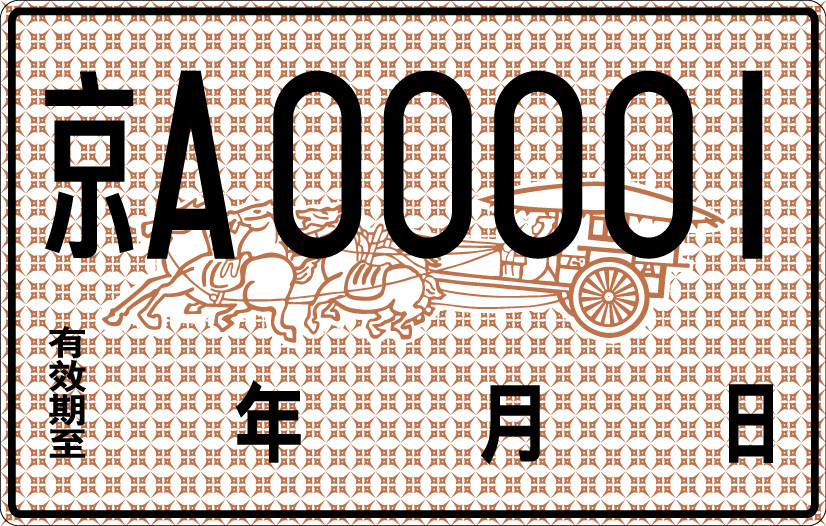
Front of Interim licence plate (drive outside of an administrative area only)

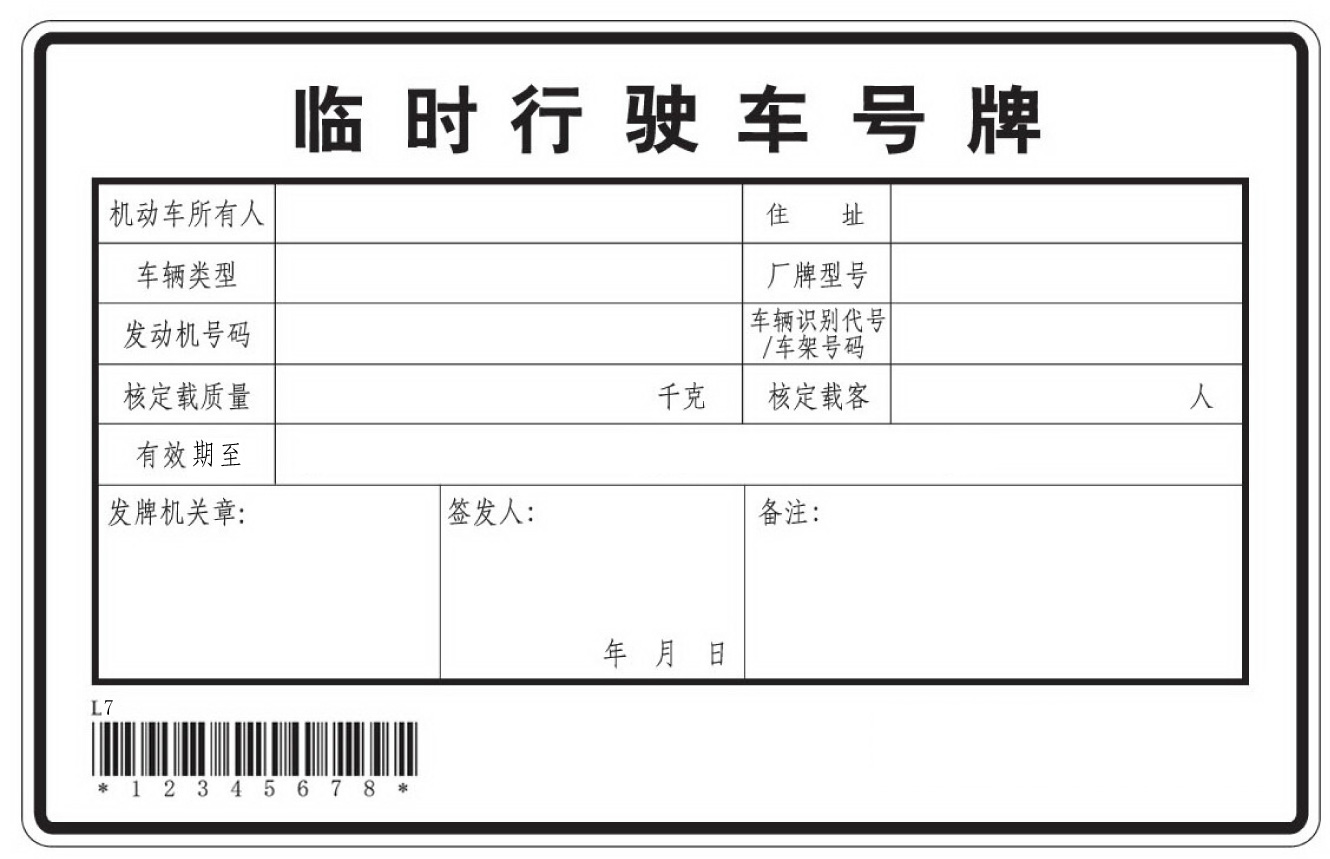
Back of Interim licence plate (drive outside of an administrative area only)

Interim licence plates are a piece of paper to be affixed to the front of the vehicle's window, usually valid for 15 days.

=== Short-lived 2002 standard ===
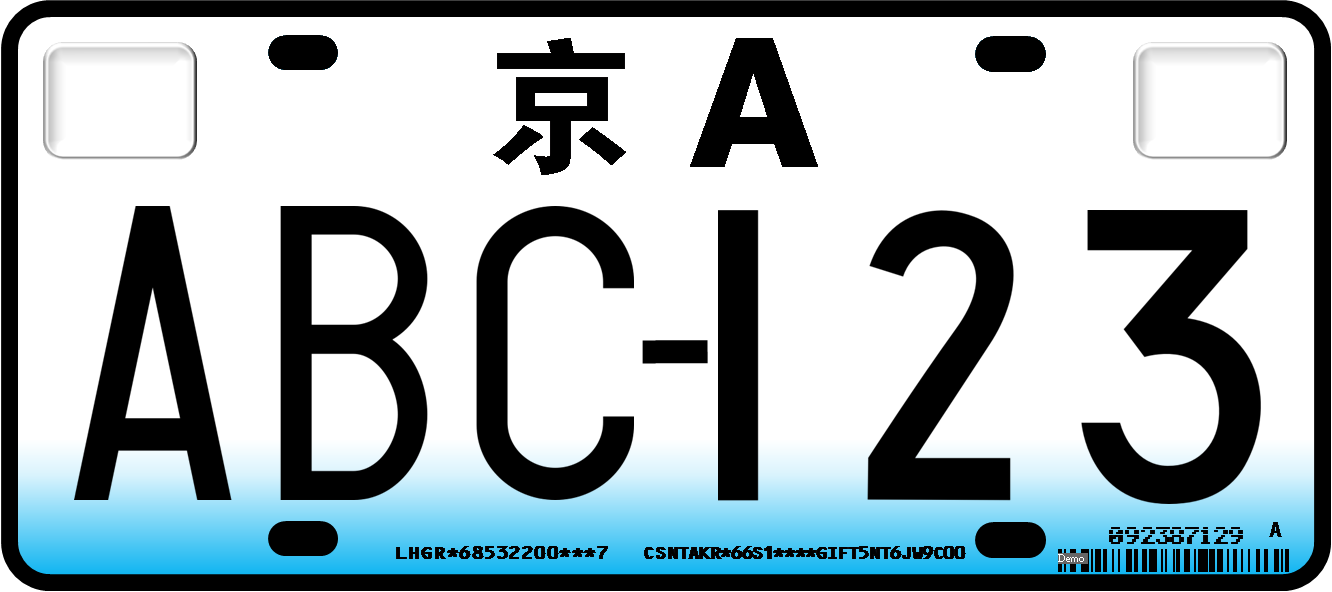
Example of the 2002-standard plate.

For a short while in the summer of 2002, a new 2002 standard was instituted in several cities, including Beijing. They enabled number/alphabetical customisation. (The possible combinations were NNN-NNN, NNN-LLL and LLL-NNN, where N would be a number and L a letter. However, although the usage of "CHN", to designate China, was not permitted in the plates, that restriction, oddly enough, did not apply to the letters "PRC".) The VIN was also added to the new plates, and the plates were white, with a gradual blue tint at the bottom end of the plates. Black letters were used on the plate.

In late August 2002 new 2002 standard plates had their issuance temporarily interrupted, officially for technical reasons, but actually because some number/alphabetical combinations of a controversial nature in mainland China were utilised. One of the biggest controversies was when a vehicle with plate number USA-911 was spotted in Beijing, causing an uproar as it was taken to be a reference to the September 11 attacks, and as such was criticized as being disrespectful to Americans. Equal uproars were created with such plates as PRC-001, and trademark violations were rife; for example, the plate number IBM-001 was seen. The WTO acronym was also spotted in the plates. In a society that is still rather conservative in this topic, the plate SEX-001 was the source of yet another controversy. The number 250, an insult in spoken Chinese, was also spotted in some plates.

Possibly due to the controversies as described above, as of summer 2003, the new plates are no longer being issued. Old plates of the 2002 standard are not being recalled. Cars who have lost their 2002-standard plates are disallowed to get a 2002-standard replacement. The 1992-standard plates will be issued instead.

=== New 2007 Standard (GA36－2007) ===
GA 36-2007

The Ministry of Public Security has announced on October 30, 2007, that the 1992 vehicle license plate system will be overhauled on November 1, 2007.

- The current black license plates assigned to foreign-owned vehicles will be phased out. New vehicles will be issued "normal" blue license plates.
- Two roman letters (not including O, or I, which could be confused with numerals) may be included among the last five places of the plate number.

A minor difference between the 2007- and the 1992-standard plates is that the separator dot between the regional code and the serial on 2007-standard plates is embossed along the characters, while that on 1992-standard plates are pressed into the plate, in the opposite direction of the characters.

Number plates issued in the 1992 standard will not be recalled but black plates will no longer be issued. Neither will plates issued to embassies be affected.

It is believed this is a China-wide standard. Many provinces and municipal cities have since introduced personalized number plates with different limitations. It is generally possible to choose from several alphabetical-numerical combination and personalize some of the digits.

For some provinces it is possible to have a letter occupying the last place of the combination, possibly to increase combination numbers.

=== New Energy vehicles license plates ===
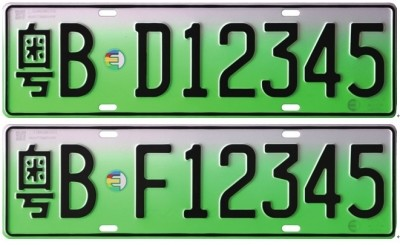
Small New Energy vehicle license plate

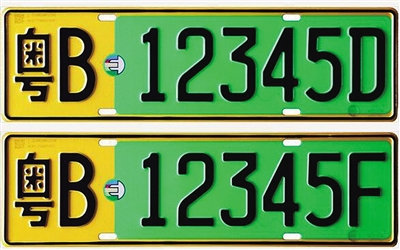
Large New Energy vehicle license plate

On November 21, 2016, the MPS announced the New Energy vehicles license plates which have been instituted in Shanghai, Nanjing, Wuxi, Jinan, and Shenzhen since December 1, 2016. These plates consist of a one-character provincial abbreviation, a letter indicating the city, and a six-character alphanumerical string, in which "D" ("E") means Electric car, "F" means other types of vehicles powered by New Energy. For small vehicles or Large New Energy vehicles, this letter is located in the first place or the last place, respectively.

New Energy Vehicle License Plates are instituted in more than 10 cities as of 2017.

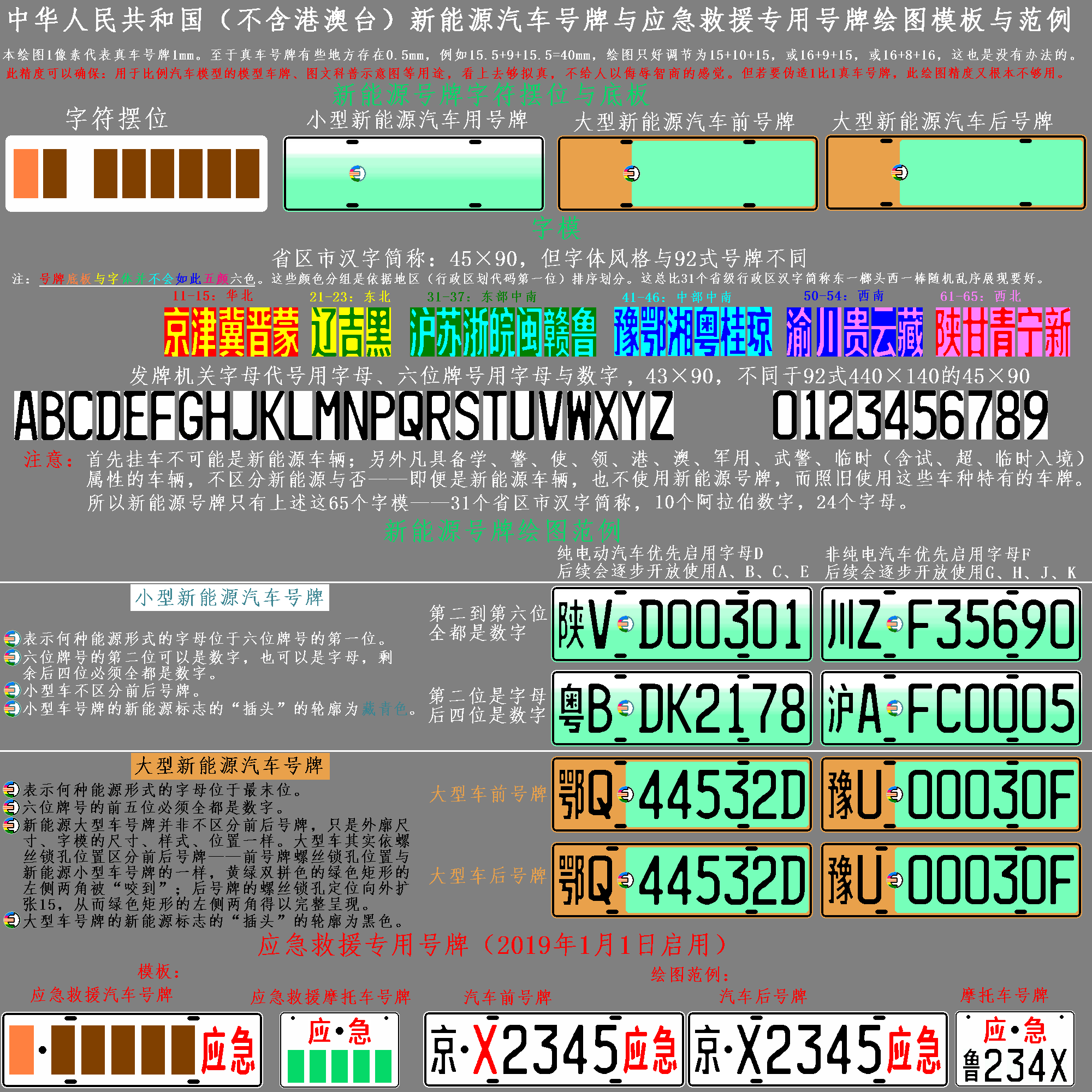
License Plate Fonts & Templates for New Energy Vehicles Plates & 2019-Standard Firetruck Plates

Dimensions for the Chinese character remains at 45 × 90 mm as the 1992 standard, whereas numbers are reduced to thinner 43 × 90mm dimensions alongside a change in font, which is now found on 2019-standard registration plates for firetrucks as well.

== List of prefixes ==
The following lists all licence plate prefixes in use in the People's Republic of China, divided into four sections: municipalities, provinces, autonomous regions and others.

=== Municipalities ===
==== Beijing ====
The initial character on licence plates issued in Beijing is: 京 (pinyin: Jīng)

- 京A (Colour in Yellow)-buses
- 京A, 京C, 京E, 京F, 京H, 京G, 京J, 京K, 京L, 京M, 京P, 京Q - Urban area
- 京B - Taxis
- 京G, 京Y - Suburbs
- 京N, 京P, 京Y - Suburbs and urban area
- 京A, 京LB, 京LC - foreigner or foreign company owned vehicle
- 京O·A - Ministry of Public Security
- 京V - Central Guard Bureau of Beijing Garrison ^{Military License}

==== Chongqing ====
The initial character on licence plates issued in Chongqing is: 渝 (Yú)

The former division before May 18, 2017:

- 渝A — Urban area
  - A "T" is further appended to taxis, for example "渝AT1234".
- 渝B — Urban
  - B "T" is further appended to taxis, for example "渝BT1234".
- 渝C — Yongchuan, Jiangjin, Hechuan, Tongnan, Tongliang, Bishan, Dazu, Qijiang, Rongchang
- 渝D — Urban extra (for A, B).
- 渝F — Wanzhou, Liangping, Chengkou, Wushan, Wuxi, Zhong, Kaizhou, Fengjie, Yunyang
- 渝G — Fuling, Nanchuan, Dianjiang, Fengdu, Wulong
- 渝H — Qianjiang, Shizhu, Xiushan, Youyang, Pengshui

From May 18, 2017, Chongqing has no division for number plate prefixes, newly registed vehicles can choose any prefix among 渝A, 渝B, 渝C, 渝D, 渝F, 渝G, 渝H from any district and county in Chongqing.

==== Shanghai ====
The initial character on licence plates issued in Shanghai is: 沪 (Hù)

- 沪A, 沪B, 沪D, 沪E, 沪F, 沪G, 沪H, 沪J, 沪K, 沪L, 沪M, 沪N — Urban area and suburbs.
- 沪C — Suburbs, not allowed to enter the urban area (i.e., not allowed to travel within the Outer Ring).
- 沪R — Chongming Island, Changxing Island, Hengsha Island, not allowed to leave the places above.

For the third character of the license plates (with 4 digits following):

- Z — New energy vehicles (except licenses begin with 沪A and 沪C).
- M, N, U to X — Taxis.
- Y — Vehicles for rent, owned by car renting operators.

==== Tianjin ====
The initial character on licence plates issued in Tianjin is: 津 (Jīn)

- 津A, 津B, 津C, 津F, 津G, 津H, 津I, 津J, 津K, 津L, 津M, 津N, 津P, 津Q, 津R — General Issues
- 津E — Taxis
- 津O — Ministry of Public Security

=== Provinces ===
==== Anhui ====
The initial character on licence plates issued in Anhui is: 皖 (Wǎn)

- 皖A—Hefei
- 皖B—Wuhu
- 皖C—Bengbu
- 皖D—Huainan
- 皖E—Ma'anshan
- 皖F—Huaibei
- 皖G—Tongling
- 皖H—Anqing
- 皖J—Huangshan
- 皖K—Fuyang
- 皖L—Suzhou
- 皖M—Chuzhou
- 皖N—Lu'an
- 皖P—Xuancheng
- 皖Q—~~Chaohu (prefecture-level, now partitioned between Hefei, Wuhu, Ma'anshan)~~, discontinued 2011
- 皖R—Chizhou
- 皖S—Bozhou

==== Fujian ====
The initial character on licence plates issued in Fujian is: 闽 (Mǐn)

- 闽A—Fuzhou
- 闽B—Putian
- 闽C—Quanzhou
- 闽D—Xiamen
- 闽E—Zhangzhou
- 闽F—Longyan
- 闽G—Sanming
- 闽H—Nanping
- 闽J—Ningde
- 闽K — Provincial-level agencies, Pingtan
- 闽O — Police

==== Gansu ====
The initial character on licence plates issued in Gansu is: 甘 (Gān)

- 甘A—Lanzhou
- 甘B—Jiayuguan
- 甘C—Jinchang
- 甘D—Baiyin
- 甘E—Tianshui
- 甘F—Jiuquan
- 甘G—Zhangye
- 甘H—Wuwei
- 甘J—Dingxi
- 甘K—Longnan
- 甘L—Pingliang
- 甘M—Qingyang
- 甘N—Linxia
- 甘P—Gannan

==== Guangdong ====
Black PRC licence plates of the 1992 standard for vehicles from Hong Kong that are permitted to cross into mainland China.

The initial character on licence plates issued in Guangdong is: 粤 (Yuè)

- 粤A—Guangzhou (粤AQ—Panyu)
- 粤B—Shenzhen
- 粤C—Zhuhai
- 粤D—Shantou
- 粤E—Foshan (粤EV—Gaoming, 粤ET—Sanshui)
- 粤F—Shaoguan
- 粤G—Zhanjiang
- 粤H—Zhaoqing (粤HL—Sihui)
- 粤J—Jiangmen
- 粤K—Maoming
- 粤L—Huizhou
- 粤M—Meizhou
- 粤N—Shanwei
- 粤O—Guangdong Provincial Public Security Department
- 粤P—Heyuan
- 粤Q—Yangjiang
- 粤R—Qingyuan
- 粤S—Dongguan
- 粤T—Zhongshan
- 粤U—Chaozhou
- 粤V—Jieyang
- 粤W—Yunfu
- 粤X— ~~former Shunde (District of Foshan),~~ discontinued February 2018
- 粤Y— ~~former Nanhai (District of Foshan),~~ discontinued February 2018
- 粤Z—Hong Kong & Macau: required only for vehicles travelling into the mainland. Hong Kong and Macau issue registration plates on their own. The registration number has 4 alphanumerics, suffixed with either 港 (for Hong Kong) or 澳 (for Macau). Not needed for passenger vehicles under the Northbound Travel for Hong Kong and Macau Vehicles program.

==== Guizhou ====
The initial character on licence plates issued in Guizhou is: 贵 (Guì)

- 贵A—Guiyang
- 贵B—Liupanshui
- 贵C—Zunyi
- 贵D—Tongren
- 贵E—Qianxinan
- 贵F—Bijie
- 贵G—Anshun
- 贵H—Qiandonnan
- 贵J—Qiannan

==== Hainan ====
The initial character on licence plates issued in Hainan is: 琼 (Qióng)

- 琼A—Haikou
- 琼B—Sanya
- 琼C—Qionghai, Wenchang, Wanning, Ding'an, Tunchang, Chengmai, Lingao
- 琼D—Wuzhishan, Dongfang, Baisha, Changjiang, Ledong, Lingshui, Baoting, Qiongzhong
- 琼E—Yangpu Economic Development Zone
- 琼F—Danzhou

==== Hebei ====
The initial character on licence plates issued in Hebei is: 冀 (Jì)

- 冀A—Shijiazhuang
  - A "Z" is further appended to taxis, for example "冀AZ1234".
- 冀B—Tangshan
  - B "T" is further appended to taxis, for example "冀BT1234".
- 冀C—Qinhuangdao
- 冀D—Handan
- 冀E—Xingtai
- 冀F—Baoding
- 冀G—Zhangjiakou
- 冀H—Chengde
- 冀J—Cangzhou
- 冀R—Langfang
- 冀T—Hengshui
- 冀X—Xiong'an

==== Heilongjiang ====
The initial character on licence plates issued in Heilongjiang is: 黑 (Hēi)

- 黑A, 黑L—Harbin
- 黑B—Qiqihar
- 黑C—Mudanjiang
- 黑D—Jiamusi
- 黑E—Daqing
- 黑F—Yichun
- 黑G—Jixi
- 黑H—Hegang
- 黑J—Shuangyashan
- 黑K—Qitaihe
- 黑M—Suihua
- 黑N—Heihe
- 黑O—Official vehicles
- 黑P—Daxing'anling
- 黑R—Nongken system

==== Henan ====
The initial character on licence plates issued in Henan is: 豫 (Yù)

- 豫A, 豫V—Zhengzhou
- 豫B—Kaifeng
- 豫C—Luoyang
- 豫D—Pingdingshan
- 豫E—Anyang
- 豫F—Hebi
- 豫G—Xinxiang
- 豫H—Jiaozuo
- 豫J—Puyang
- 豫K—Xuchang
- 豫L—Luohe
- 豫M—Sanmenxia
- 豫N—Shangqiu
- 豫P—Zhoukou
- 豫Q—Zhumadian
- 豫R—Nanyang
- 豫S—Xinyang
- 豫U—Jiyuan

==== Hubei ====
The initial character on licence plates issued in Hubei is: 鄂 (È)

- 鄂A, 鄂W —Wuhan
  - 鄂AX — Taxis in Wuhan
- 鄂B—Huangshi
- 鄂C—Shiyan
  - 鄂CT — Taxis in Shiyan
- 鄂D—Jingzhou
- 鄂E—Yichang
- 鄂F—Xiangyang
- 鄂G—Ezhou
- 鄂H—Jingmen
- 鄂J—Huanggang
- 鄂K—Xiaogan
- 鄂L—Xianning
- 鄂M—Xiantao
- 鄂N—Qianjiang
- 鄂P—Shennongjia
- 鄂Q—Enshi
- 鄂R—Tianmen
- 鄂S—Suizhou

==== Hunan ====
The initial character on licence plates issued in Hunan is: 湘 (Xiāng)

- 湘A—Changsha
- 湘B—Zhuzhou
- 湘C—Xiangtan
- 湘D—Hengyang
- 湘E—Shaoyang
- 湘F—Yueyang
- 湘G—Zhangjiajie
- 湘H—Yiyang
- 湘J—Changde
- 湘K—Loudi
- 湘L—Chenzhou
- 湘M—Yongzhou
- 湘N—Huaihua
- 湘S—~~Provincial-level agencies~~ (phased out in 2014)
- 湘U—Xiangxi

==== Jiangsu ====
The initial character on licence plates issued in Jiangsu is: 苏 (Sū)

- 苏A—Nanjing
- 苏B—Wuxi
- 苏C—Xuzhou
- 苏D—Changzhou
- 苏E, 苏U—Suzhou
- 苏F—Nantong
- 苏G—Lianyungang
- 苏H—Huai'an
- 苏J—Yancheng
- 苏K—Yangzhou
- 苏L—Zhenjiang
- 苏M—Taizhou
- 苏N—Suqian

==== Jiangxi ====
The initial character on licence plates issued in Jiangxi is: 赣 (Gàn)

- 赣A—Nanchang
- 赣B—Ganzhou
- 赣C—Yichun
- 赣D—Ji'an
- 赣E—Shangrao
- 赣F—Fuzhou
- 赣G—Jiujiang
- 赣H—Jingdezhen
- 赣J—Pingxiang
- 赣K—Xinyu
- 赣L—Yingtan
- 赣M—Nanchang extra

==== Jilin ====
The initial character on licence plates issued in Jilin is: 吉 (Jí)

- 吉A—Changchun
- 吉B—Jilin City
- 吉C—Siping
- 吉D—Liaoyuan
- 吉E—Tonghua
- 吉F—Baishan
- 吉G—Baicheng
- 吉H—Yanbian
- 吉J—Songyuan
- 吉K—Changbai Mountain Protection Development Zone

==== Liaoning ====
The initial character on licence plates issued in Liaoning is: 辽 (Liáo)

- 辽A—Shenyang
- 辽B—Dalian
  - A "T" is further appended to taxis, for example "辽BT1234".
- 辽C—Anshan
- 辽D—Fushun
- 辽E—Benxi
- 辽F—Dandong
- 辽G—Jinzhou
- 辽H—Yingkou
- 辽J—Fuxin
- 辽K—Liaoyang
- 辽L—Panjin
- 辽M—Tieling
- 辽N—Chaoyang
- 辽O—~~Police~~ (phased out in 2014)
- 辽P—Huludao

==== Qinghai ====
The initial character on licence plates issued in Qinghai is: 青 (Qīng)

- 青A—Xining
  - 青AT — Taxis in Xining
- 青B—Haidong
- 青C—Haibei
- 青D—Huangnan
- 青E—Hainan
- 青F—Golog
- 青G—Gyêgu
- 青H—Haixi

==== Shaanxi ====
The initial character on licence plates issued in Shaanxi is: 陕 (Shǎn)

- 陕A—Xi'an
  - 陕AT — Taxis in Xi'an
  - 陕AU — Taxis in Xi'an
  - 陕AV — Provincial-level agencies
- 陕B—Tongchuan
- 陕C—Baoji
- 陕D—Xianyang
- 陕E—Weinan
- 陕F—Hanzhong
- 陕G—Ankang
- 陕H—Shangluo
- 陕J—Yan'an
- 陕K—Yulin
- 陕U—Xi'an extra (approved in April 2020)
- 陕V — Yangling

==== Shandong ====
The initial character on licence plates issued in Shandong is: 鲁 (Lǔ)

A "T" is further appended to taxis, for example "鲁B T1234", "鲁E T1234", "鲁Q T1234".

- 鲁A, 鲁S—Jinan
- 鲁B, 鲁U—Qingdao
- 鲁C—Zibo
- 鲁D—Zaozhuang
- 鲁E—Dongying
- 鲁F, 鲁Y—Yantai
- 鲁G, 鲁V—Weifang
- 鲁H—Jining
- 鲁J—Tai'an
- 鲁K—Weihai
- 鲁L—Rizhao
- 鲁M—Binzhou
- 鲁N—Dezhou
- 鲁O—~~Police~~ (phased out in 2019)
- 鲁P—Liaocheng
- 鲁Q, 鲁W—Linyi
- 鲁R—Heze

==== Shanxi ====
The initial character on licence plates issued in Shanxi is: 晋 (Jìn)

- 晋A—Taiyuan
- 晋B—Datong
- 晋C—Yangquan
- 晋D—Changzhi
- 晋E—Jincheng
- 晋F—Shuozhou
- 晋H—Xinzhou
- 晋J—Lüliang
- 晋K—Jinzhong
- 晋L—Linfen
- 晋M—Yuncheng

==== Sichuan ====
The initial character on licence plates issued in Sichuan is: 川 (Chuān)

In 1997, Chongqing was split from Sichuan Province, and characters on licence plates were adjusted.

- 川A—Chengdu
- 川B—Mianyang (previously Chongqing, sub-provincial city)
- 川C—Zigong
- 川D—Panzhihua
- 川E—Luzhou
- 川F—Deyang
- 川G—Chengdu extra (previously Mianyang)
- 川H—Guangyuan
- 川J—Suining
- 川K—Neijiang
- 川L—Leshan
- 川M—Ziyang (previously Wanxian, now merged into Chongqing)
- 川N—~~former Fuling (now merged into Chongqing)~~, discontinued 1997
- 川O—issued by Vehicle Management Office of Sichuan Provincial Public Security Department
- 川P—~~former Qianjiang (now merged into Chongqing)~~, discontinued 1997
- 川Q—Yibin
- 川R—Nanchong
- 川S—Dazhou
- 川T—Ya'an
- 川U—Ngawa
- 川V—Garzê
- 川W—Liangshan
- 川X—Guang'an
- 川Y—Bazhong
- 川Z—Meishan

==== Yunnan ====
The initial character on licence plates issued in Yunnan is: 云 (Yún)

- 云A—Kunming
- 云B—~~former Dongchuan (prefecture-level, now merged into Kunming)~~, discontinued 1999
- 云C—Zhaotong
- 云D—Qujing
- 云E—Chuxiong
- 云F—Yuxi
  - A "T" is further appended to taxis, for example "云FT1234".
- 云G—Honghe
- 云H—Wenshan
- 云J—Pu'er
- 云K—Xishuangbanna
- 云L—Dali
- 云M—Baoshan
- 云N—Dehong
- 云P—Lijiang
- 云Q—Nujiang
- 云R—Dêqên
- 云S—Lincang

==== Zhejiang ====
The initial character on licence plates issued in Zhejiang is: 浙 (Zhè)

- 浙A, 浙M—Hangzhou
- 浙B—Ningbo
- 浙C—Wenzhou
- 浙D—Shaoxing
- 浙E—Huzhou
- 浙F—Jiaxing
- 浙G—Jinhua
- 浙H—Quzhou
- 浙J—Taizhou
- 浙K—Lishui
- 浙L—Zhoushan
- 浙O — Black license plates belonging to cars registered to foreign enterprises

=== Autonomous regions ===
==== Guangxi ====
The initial character on licence plates issued in Guangxi is: 桂 (Guì)

- 桂A—Nanning
- 桂B—Liuzhou
- 桂C, 桂H—Guilin (桂H is reserved for counties in the outskirts of Guilin)
- 桂D—Wuzhou
- 桂E—Beihai
- 桂F—Chongzuo
- 桂G—Laibin
- 桂J—Hezhou
- 桂K—Yulin
- 桂L—Baise
- 桂M—Hechi
- 桂N—Qinzhou
- 桂P—Fangchenggang
- 桂R—Guigang

==== Inner Mongolia ====
The initial character on licence plates issued in Inner Mongolia is: 蒙 (Měng)

- 蒙A—Hohhot
- 蒙B—Baotou
- 蒙C—Wuhai
- 蒙D—Chifeng
- 蒙E—Hulunbuir
- 蒙F—Hinggan
- 蒙G—Tongliao
- 蒙H—Xilingol
- 蒙J—Ulanqab
- 蒙K—Ordos
- 蒙L—Bayannur
- 蒙M—Alxa League

==== Ningxia ====
The initial character on licence plates issued in Ningxia is: 宁 (Níng)

- 宁A—Yinchuan
- 宁B—Shizuishan
- 宁C—Wuzhong
- 宁D—Guyuan
- 宁E—Zhongwei

==== Xizang ====
Initial character of licence plates used in Xizang is: 藏 (Zàng)

- 藏A—Lhasa
- 藏B—Qamdo
- 藏C—Shannan
- 藏D—Xigazê
- 藏E—Naqu
- 藏F—Ngari Prefecture
- 藏G—Nyingchi

==== Xinjiang ====
The initial character on licence plates issued in Xinjiang is: 新 (Xīn)

- 新A—Ürümqi
- 新B—Changji, Wujiaqu
- 新C—Shihezi
- 新D—Kuitun, Huyanghe
- 新E—Börtala, Shuanghe
- 新F—Ili (Districts under direct administration of Ili Prefecture, except Kuitun), Kokdala
- 新G—Tacheng, Baiyang
- 新H—Altay, Beitun
- 新J—Karamay
- 新K—Turpan
- 新L—Hami, Xinxing
- 新M—Bayin'gholin, Tiemenguan
- 新N—Aksu, Aral
- 新O—Police
- 新P—Kizilsu
- 新Q—Kashgar (Except Kargilik), Tumxuk
- 新R—Hotan, Kargilik
- 新S—Kunyu

== See also ==
- Vehicle registration plates of Hong Kong
- Vehicle registration plates of Macau
- Vehicle registration plates of Taiwan
