= Vehicle registration plates of Botswana =

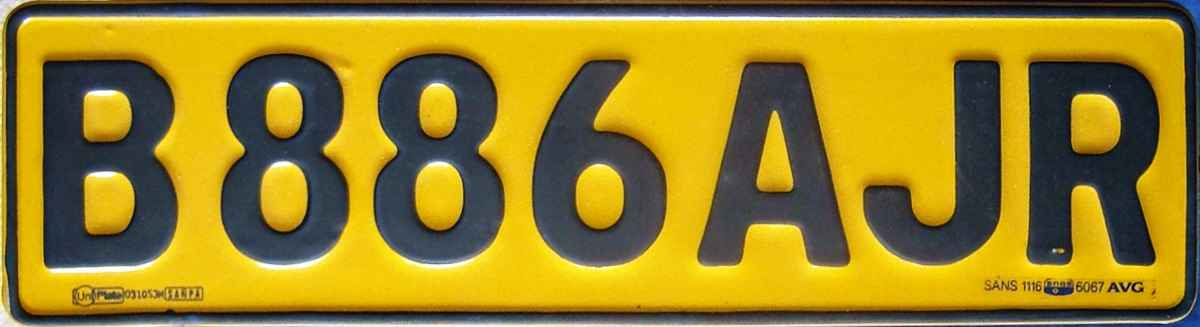
Number plate from Botswana

Vehicle registration plates of Botswana for normal motor vehicles begin with the letter B, followed by three digits, followed by three letters. The digits and letters are assigned by a registrar. The three letters will never include the letter Q so as to avoid confusion with the letter O. The front number plates have black lettering on a white reflective background. The rear number plates have black lettering on a yellow reflective background. Public passenger number plates have white lettering on blue background at both the front and rear.

Government vehicles all have the prefix BX, except defence force vehicles which have the prefix BDF. The front BX number plates have red lettering on a white reflective background. The rear BX number plates have white lettering on a red reflective background. The BDF number plates have white letters on a green non-reflective background for the front plate and black letters on a green non-reflective background for the rear plate.

Diplomatic vehicles’ number plates starts with two digits, two letters (CD, CC or CT) and a further three digits. These digits are allocated by the Minister of Foreign Affairs.

Image	First issued	Design	Slogan	Serial format	Serials issued	Notes
		Black on White		A123BCD		Passenger car front plate
		Black on Yellow		A123BCD		Passenger car rear plate
		White on Blue		A123BCD		Public service vehicle rear plate
		White on Red		AB123456		Government vehicle rear plate

== Republic of Botswana and Bechuanaland Protectorate ==
These codes dating back to the Protectorate continued in use after independence:

- BPA – Francistown
- BPB – Serowe
- BPC – Tuli Block
- BPD – Gaborone
- BPE – Molepolole
- BPF – Lobatse
- BPG – Kanye
- BPH – Tshabong
- BPI – Ghanzi
- BPJ – Maun
- BPK – Kasane
- BPL – Mochudi

Government:

- BPX – Government vehicles
