= Latif (disambiguation) =

Latif is a common Muslim given name (see article for a list of persons with the name).

Latif or Lateef may also refer to:

== Media ==
=== Television ===
- TvOne (Indonesia), previously name Lativi, Television in Indonesia

== Places ==
- Latif, Hamadan, a village in Iran
- Latif, Khuzestan, a village in Iran
- Latif, Lorestan, a village in Iran

== Other uses ==
- Lateef (film), a 2015 Indian film
- Latif (video game player) (born 1989/90), a Saudi-American fighting games player
- Latif (singer/songwriter), an American rhythm and blues singer
- Isaac ibn Latif (1210-1280), a Jewish neoplatonist philosopher

== See also ==
- Latifabad, a town near Hyderabad in the Pakistani province of Sindh
- Latifiya, an Iraqi city south of Baghdad
- Latifa (disambiguation)
- Latife (disambiguation)
- Lateef (disambiguation)
- Latifi (disambiguation)
