= Muhemmetimin Iminov =

Chinese politician (1915–1970)

- 买买提伊敏·伊敏诺夫; مۇھەممەتئىمىن ئىمىنوف
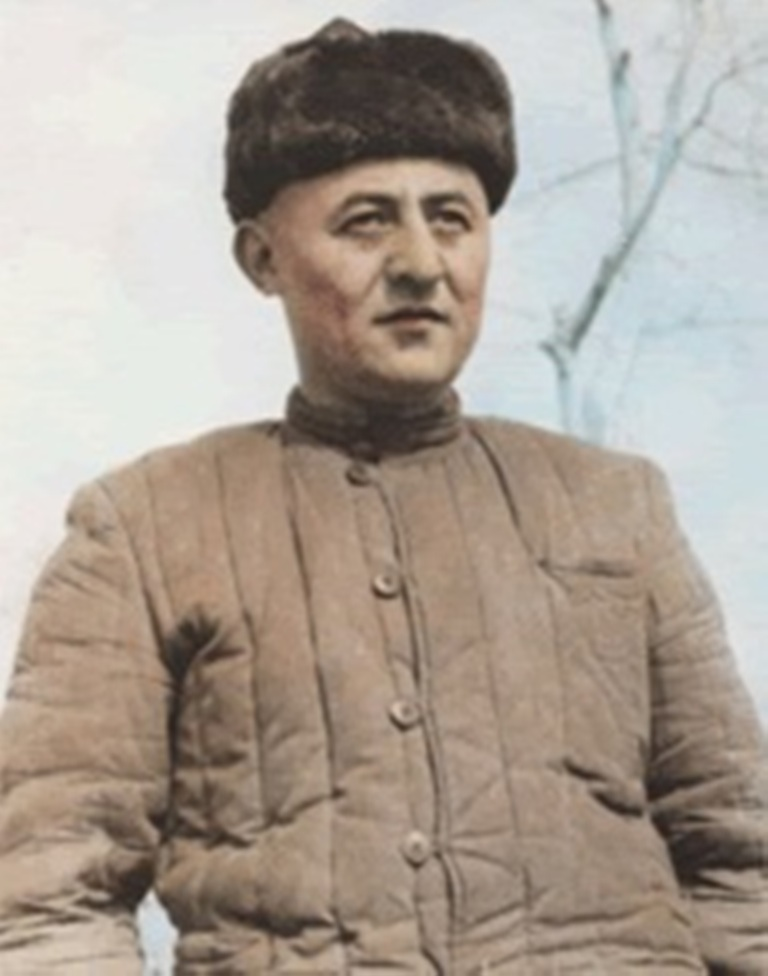
- Muhemmetimin in 1950

Personal details
- Born: August 1915 Artush, Xinjiang Province, Republic of China
- Died: 17 May 1970 (aged 54)
- Resting place: Ürümqi Revolutionary Martyrs Cemetery
- Party: Xinjiang People's Anti-Imperialist Association (1940–1942); East Turkestan Revolutionary Party (1946–1947); Chinese Communist Party (joined 1950); East Turkestan People's Revolutionary Party (1960s, alleged)
- Children: Polat (son)

Chinese name
- Simplified Chinese: 买买提伊敏·伊敏诺夫
- Traditional Chinese: 買買提伊敏·伊敏諾夫
Transcriptions
Standard Mandarin
- Hanyu Pinyin: Mǎimǎitíyīmǐn Yīmǐnnuòfū

Uyghur name
- Uyghur: مۇھەممەتئىمىن ئىمىنوف
Transcriptions
- Latin Yëziqi: Muhemmet'imin Iminof
- SASM/GNC: Muhämmät Imin Iminof
- Siril Yëziqi: Мухәммәтимин Иминов

Muhemmetimin Iminov (Note: His given name has also been transliterated in English as Muhemmet'imin, Muhemmet Imin, Muhammad Amin, Memtimin, and Mamtimin.) (Note: Chinese: 买买提伊敏·伊敏诺夫; pinyin: Mǎimǎitíyīmǐn Yīmǐnnuòfū; Uyghur: مۇھەممەتئىمىن ئىمىنوف, romanized: Muhemmet'imin Iminof) (August 1915 – 17 May 1970) was a Chinese politician who held high-ranking positions in the local governments of Xinjiang. An ethnic Uyghur from the far-western city of Artush, Muhemmetimin began his political career in the Xinjiang People's Anti-Imperialist Association, a pro-Soviet and anti-Kuomintang organisation. He then became a prominent figure in the Second East Turkestan Republic, serving as a cavalry commander in the East Turkestan National Army and as a central executive committee member of the East Turkestan Revolutionary Party. He joined the Chinese Communist Party in 1950, following the incorporation of Xinjiang into the People's Republic of China the previous year. He later served as the Vice Chairman of the Xinjiang Uyghur Autonomous Region and the Deputy Commander of the Southern Xinjiang Military Region.

Muhemmetimin was denounced during the Anti-Rightist Campaign and the Campaign Against Local Nationalism as an "ethnic nationalist" and "counter revolutionary" of the late 1950s, despite the efforts of his friend and colleague, Xinjiang government chairman Seypidin Azizi. He was purged during the Cultural Revolution and died on 17 May 1970; however, he was posthumously rehabilitated by the CCP in October 1986 and his remains were moved to the Ürümqi Revolutionary Martyrs Cemetery. He was survived by a son named Polat and two daughters who fled to the Soviet Union in 1962.
