= Latifi =

Latifi may refer to:

- Latifi (surname), an Arab-based surname, including a list of persons by this name
- Latifî (1491–1582), Ottoman poet
- Latifi, Iran, a city in the Central District of Larestan County, Fars Province, Iran
- Latifi Press, a publisher in India

== See also ==
- Montivipera latifii (Latifi's viper), a snake
- Latifi's dwarf gecko, a lizard
- Latif (disambiguation)
- Lativi, the former name of tvOne (Indonesian TV network)
