= Latifabad, Iran =

Latifabad (Persian: لطيف اباد) may refer to:

- Latifabad, Hamadan
- Latifabad, Lorestan
- Latifabad, Razavi Khorasan
