= Lutfi =

Lutfi (also spelled Lotfi or Luthfi, from Arabic: لطفي), is a male given name and surname meaning "kind" or "gracious". It may refer to:

== Given name ==
=== Lotfi ===
- Lotfi A. Zadeh (1921–2017), Azerbaijani electrical engineer
- Lotfi Akalay (1943-2019), Moroccan writer
- Lotfi Nezzar, Algerian businessman

=== Lutfi, Lütfi ===
==== First name ====
- Lutfi (court official), Ottoman court official
- Lütfi Doğan (politician, born 1930) (1930–2023), theologian and politician
- Lütfi Doğan (politician, born 1927) (1927–2018), Turkish academic, theologian and politician
- Lutfi Haziri (born 1969), Kosovar politician
- Lutfi Lepaja (born 1945), Albanian writer
- Lütfi Pasha (1488-1564), Ottoman statesman
- Lütfi Akadlı (1902–1988), Turkish judge
- Lütfi Arıboğan (born 1961), Turkish basketball player
- Lütfi Elvan (born 1962), Turkish mining engineer, politician and government minister
- Lutfi Kabirova (1932-2013), Tajikistani opera singer

==== Middle name ====
- Ömer Lütfi Akad (1916–2011), Turkish film director
- Metin Lütfi Baydar (born 1960), Turkish medical scientist
- Mohammed Lutfi Farhat (born 1945), Libyan politician
- Fevzi Lütfi Karaosmanoğlu (1900–1978), Turkish politician and journalist
- Ali Lutfi Mahmud (1935–2018), Egyptian politician
- Mustafa Lutfi al-Manfaluti (1876-1924), Egyptian writer
- Ahmed Lutfi el-Sayed (1872–1963), Egyptian intellectual

=== Luthfi ===
- Muhammad Luthfi bin Yahya (born 1947), Indonesian Shaikh

== Surname ==
- Abdolali Lotfi (1880–1956), Iranian judge and politician
- Amer Husni Lutfi (1956-2018), Syrian politician
- Dariush Lotfi (born 2001), Austrian diver
- Huda Lutfi (born 1948), Egyptian artist and historian
- Ibtisam Lutfi (born 1950), Saudi Arabian singer
- João Lutfi, known professionally as Sérgio Ricardo (director) (1932–2020), Brazilian film director
- Mohammad-Reza Lotfi (1947–2014), Persian classical musician
- Nadia Lutfi (1938–2020), Egyptian actress
- Saeid Lotfi (footballer, born 1981) (born 1981), Iranian footballer
- Saeid Lotfi (footballer, born 1992) (born 1992), Iranian footballer
- Sam Lutfi, former manager of Britney Spears
- Sigrid Lotfi (1921–2014), German-born Iranian translator
- Tariq Lutfi (born 1951), Pakistani footballer

== Places ==
- Lutfi, Iran
- Lotfabad

== See also ==
- Lutfullah, Latif and Latifa, names with a similar origin
