= East Turkestan Revolutionary Party =

Communist party in Xinjiang, China (1946–1947)

- Chairman: Abdukerim Abbasov
- Secretary-General: Abdulla Zakirov
- Founded: 26 April 1946
- Dissolved: 3 February 1947
- Merged into: Democratic Revolutionary Party
- Headquarters: Ghulja (Yining)
- Youth wing: East Turkestan Revolutionary Youth League
- Ideology: Communism; Marxism–Leninism
- Political position: Far-left

The East Turkestan Revolutionary Party (ETRP) (Note: Uyghur: شەرقىي تۈركىستان ئىنقىلاۋى پارتىيىسى, romanized: Sherqiy Türkistan Inqilawi Partiyisi; Russian: Революционная партия Восточного Туркестана, romanized: Revolyutsionnaya partiya Vostochnogo Turkestana; Chinese: 东突厥斯坦革命党; pinyin: Dōng Tūjuésītǎn Gémìng Dǎng) was a clandestine communist party active from 1946 to 1947, in what is now Ili Kazakh Autonomous Prefecture, in the Xinjiang Uyghur Autonomous Region of China. Abdukerim Abbasov, a Uyghur revolutionary who served as the interior minister of the Second East Turkestan Republic (ETR), led the party as chairman of a seven-member Central Eecutive Committee.

The ETRP emerged from the more moderate East Turkestan Revolutionary Youth League (ETRYL), a group of young, progressive-minded intellectuals who opposed the conservative faction of the ETR government. Many party members came from the ETRYL, and the ETRYL later became the party's youth wing. Marxist–Leninist in its orientation, the ETRP's constitution, program, and organisational structure drew from those of the Soviet and Chinese communist parties.

== Names ==
East Turkestan Revolutionary Party

Uyghur name
- Uyghur: شەرقىي تۈركىستان ئىنقىلاۋى پارتىيىسى
Transcriptions
- Latin Yëziqi: Sherqiy Türkistan Inqilawi Partiyisi
- Yengi Yeziⱪ: Xərⱪiy Türkistan Inⱪilawi Partiyisi
- Siril Yëziqi: Шәрқий Түркистан Инқилави Партийиси

Russian name
- Russian: Революционная партия Восточного Туркестана
- Romanization: Revolyutsionnaya partiya Vostochnogo Turkestana

Chinese name
- Simplified Chinese: 东突厥斯坦革命党
- Traditional Chinese: 東突厥斯坦革命黨
Transcriptions
Standard Mandarin
- Hanyu Pinyin: Dōng Tūjuésītǎn Gémìng Dǎng

People's Revolutionary Party
- Simplified Chinese: 人民革命党
- Traditional Chinese: 人民革命黨
Transcriptions
Standard Mandarin
- Hanyu Pinyin: Rénmín Gémìng Dǎng

Three Districts People's Revolutionary Party
- Simplified Chinese: 三区人民革命党
- Traditional Chinese: 三區人民革命黨
Transcriptions
Standard Mandarin
- Hanyu Pinyin: Sān Qū Rénmín Gémìng Dǎng

Xinjiang People's Revolutionary Party
- Simplified Chinese: 新疆人民革命党
- Traditional Chinese: 新疆人民革命黨
Transcriptions
Standard Mandarin
- Hanyu Pinyin: Xīnjiāng Rénmín Gémìng Dǎng

Sources differ as to the official name of the party, but Abdukerim's handwritten copy of the party constitution is titled "Constitution of the East Turkestan Revolutionary Party". (Note: Uyghur: شەرقىي تۈركىستان ئىنقىلاۋى پارتىيىسى نىزامنامىسى, romanized: Sherqiy Türkistan Inqilawi Partiyisi Nizamnamisi) The first chapter of the constitution, titled "On the Name of the Party", further states:

Our party is established with a base of the most progressive intellectuals; in line with the international situation at present and East Turkestan's current stage of historical development, the name of the party shall be set as the East Turkestan Revolutionary Party.

Chinese sources generally describe the party as the People's Revolutionary Party. (Note: Chinese: 人民革命党; pinyin: Rénmín Gémìng Dǎng) The names Three Districts People's Revolutionary Party (Note: Chinese: 三区人民革命党; pinyin: Sān Qū Rénmín Gémìng Dǎng) and Xinjiang People's Revolutionary Party (Note: Chinese: 新疆人民革命党; pinyin: Xīnjiāng Rénmín Gémìng Dǎng) are sometimes used to differentiate from the similarly named East Turkestan People's Revolutionary Party of the 1960s and 1970s.

Prior to the party's founding, the Soviet leadership in Moscow suggested to Abdukerim and his Soviet contacts that the party be named the People's Party of Xinjiang, as such a name would appeal to all ethnic groups in Xinjiang (particularly the Han Chinese) and appease the Chinese authorities. The latter reason was especially important to Moscow, which hoped to improve Sino-Soviet relations while maintaining influence in Xinjiang. Abdukerim rejected the proposal.

== History ==
=== Background ===
The East Turkestan Revolutionary Party (ETRP) was active in the "Three Districts" of northern Xinjiang – Ili, Tarbagatay, and Altay – when the region was governed by the Second East Turkestan Republic (ETR). The ETR was proclaimed on 12 November 1944, following successful uprisings in the Three Districts, particularly in the city of Ghulja (Yining), which became the ETR's capital. The uprisings came to be known collectively as the Ili Rebellion. The ETR government consisted of Turkic intellectuals of various ideologies and political goals. The leadership was dominated by religious conservatives, who viewed the rebellion as a war of national liberation to restore the First East Turkestan Republic which had been founded exactly eleven years earlier. Soviet-educated progressives within the leadership viewed the rebellion as an anti-imperialist revolution against the Kuomintang (Chinese Nationalists). The latter view held by the progressives was supported by the Chinese Communist Party (CCP), which called the rebellion the "Three Districts Revolution". (Note: Chinese: 三区革命; pinyin: Sān Qū Gémìng)

The Soviet Union covertly backed the rebels and supported the ETR, which was receptive to Soviet interests in the region. However, at the same time, the Soviets did not wish to antagonise its wartime ally China. The Soviet leadership overlooked the fact that the ruling party of China at the time, the Kuomintang, was anti-communist; they hoped to create cordial relations with the Kuomintang to ensure postwar security along their shared borders. As such, the Soviets were careful not to openly support communists in the region during the time of the ETR, which would make their negotiation efforts with the Kuomintang appear disingenuous.

=== Origins and founding ===
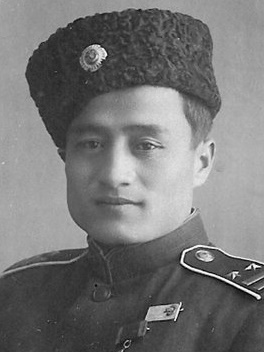
Abdukerim Abbasov led the effort to establish the ETRP as the vanguard party of East Turkestan (Xinjiang).

The ETRP's origins can be traced to the East Turkestan Revolutionary Youth League (ETRYL), which was founded by disgruntled members of the ETR government. A group of young, progressive-minded intellectuals within the government opposed the presidency of Elihan Tore, who headed the government's conservative leadership. In November 1945, they formed the ETRYL, the leadership of which consisted of the progressive faction of the ETR government headed by Abdukerim. However, not all progressive leaders of the ETR were involved in the ETRYL's founding; most significantly, the pro-Soviet foreign minister Ehmetjan Qasim was preoccupied with peace negotiations with the Kuomintang. The ETRYL quickly gained support amongst Soviet- and Chinese-educated youth; in a matter of weeks, its membership ballooned to 14,000, spread over 27 counties of the Three Districts.

At its onset, the ETRYL was not ideological; it advocated an ethnically inclusive form of civic nationalism and centered its platform on a narrow set of issues, chiefly opposition to the Kuomintang. However, members of the ETRYL's central committee, particularly Abdukerim, felt that it was necessary to establish a vanguard party to guide the ETRYL toward revolutionary action. Anwar Hanbaba, an ETRYL central committee member, described in his memoirs the then necessity of a vanguard party:

In human societies of every epoch, the training of youths and the grooming of successors have been important matters, and the Three Districts Revolution was no different in this regard. In order to meet these important tasks, the provisional government and peoples of the Three Districts needed to train, organize, and utilize the youthful energy of the young people to ... consolidate, unite, and galvanise them in the fight against the Kuomintang reactionaries.

Sources differ as to when the ETRP was founded. Seypidin Azizi, another ETRYL central committee member, wrote in his memoirs that the ETRP was founded in December 1945. This is repeated in Xinjiang's Local History, the Chinese government-approved textbook used in Xinjiang's secondary schools. Party records published by the ETRP's successor, the Democratic Revolutionary Party, give the date 26 April 1946. Hanbaba meanwhile stated that the party was founded on 5 May 1946.

The ETRP was founded with the blessing of the Soviet leadership, with whom Abdukerim consulted when drafting the party's program and organisational framework. The party modelled itself after the Communist Party of the Soviet Union (CPSU), (Note: Then known as the All-Union Communist Party (Bolsheviks).) with adjustments to account for the material conditions of Xinjiang. The ETYRL became the party's youth wing. A seven-member Central Executive Committee (CEC) was elected with Abdukerim serving as its chair. Other members of the CEC were unaware of Abdukerim's communications with the Soviets. For example, Seypidin incorrectly believed that the ETRP's existence had been kept secret from the Soviets to avoid their interference.

=== Communications with the Chinese Communist Party ===
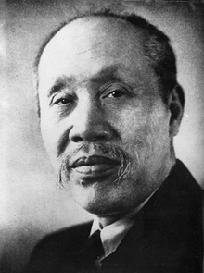
Chinese Communist Party delegate Dong Biwu met with Abdukerim Abbasov in Nanjing.

In December 1946, Abdukerim travelled to the then Chinese capital Nanjing, ostensibly to attend a session of the Chinese National Assembly as a delegate from Xinjiang. In actuality, he was attempting to establish contact with the CCP to ask for help in starting a second revolution in Xinjiang, in the same vein as the October Revolution in Russia. Dong Biwu, a CCP delegate from Yan'an, secretly met with Abdukerim in Nanjing. Abdukerim explained to Dong that the ETRP had been working closely with the Han Chinese–majority Communist League of Xinjiang headquartered in Dihua (Ürümqi), and that together they numbered in the tens-of-thousands. Both groups hoped to integrate their membership into the CPSU, but the Soviet leadership had not yet received their request. Abdukerim therefore reached out to the CCP for its support. Dong immediately relayed this information back to the CCP central committee in Yan'an via telegraph and scheduled a second meeting with Abdukerim.

At their second meeting, Dong provided Abdukerim documents from the CCP's 7th National Congress and the opinions of the CCP leadership. Dong extended the warm greetings of Zhou Enlai, the vice chairman of the military commission of the central committee. Zhou agreed in principle to CCP membership for leaders of the ETRP and the Communist League. However, Zhou also relayed the CCP central committee's opinion that the ETRP's name was "inappropriate" as it implied support for an independent East Turkestan. Abdukerim responded by agreeing in principle to table the "Xinjiang national question". Before Abdukerim left to return to Ghulja, Dong gave him radio equipment for the ETRP to contact the CCP with. The radio, however, was not sufficiently powerful to reach Yan'an from Ghulja and the two communist groups could not establish regular communication.

=== Dissolution ===
Abdukerim returned to Ghulja in early 1947 and immediately made arrangements to meet with the leaders of the Communist League. On 3 February 1947, the leaders of the ETRP and the Communist League met in Dihua. Abdukerim informed the attendees of the CCP central committee's opinions and recommendations, and the two groups agreed to a CCP-recommended merger. The dissolution of both groups and the formation of the Democratic Revolutionary Party were declared later that day.

== Ideology and program ==
The ETRP's program was reviewed and edited by the Soviets before its founding. In late 1945, a draft party program, approved by Abdukerim, was submitted to the Soviet leadership in Moscow by Usman Yusupov, the first secretary of the Communist Party of Uzbekistan (Bolsheviks). The Soviet ministries of interior and state security wrote their own draft and submitted it to Mikhail Suslov, the head of the foreign policy department of the All-Union Communist Party (Bolsheviks). After reading and comparing the two drafts, Suslov sent an amended version to the Soviet party secretary for ideology, Andrei Zhdanov. Owing to the Soviets' wishes to not further antagonise the Chinese, Suslov's draft included sentences which clarified that the ETRP's request for internal autonomy in Xinjiang would not deny China's claims of sovereignty over the region, and that the ETRP would "support all progressive measures of the government of the Republic of China."

The ETRP was founded with the goal of becoming a vanguard party for the masses of Xinjiang, particularly the youth through the ETRYL. Article 8 of the ETRP's constitution stated that the party's purpose was to "raise the youth to become fighters, patriots, and internationalists." The ETRP's founders felt that the ETRYL, as an above-ground organisation, was too moderate and hindered by the constant interference of the ETR's conservative leadership. The foundation of an underground, strictly Marxist–Leninist organisation would therefore serve to guide future revolutionary action in a socialist direction, in contrast to the non-ideological, civic nationalist platform of the ETRYL. The constitution of the ETRP drew from the CCP constitution at the time, particularly Mao Zedong's concept of "New Democracy".

== Central Executive Committee ==
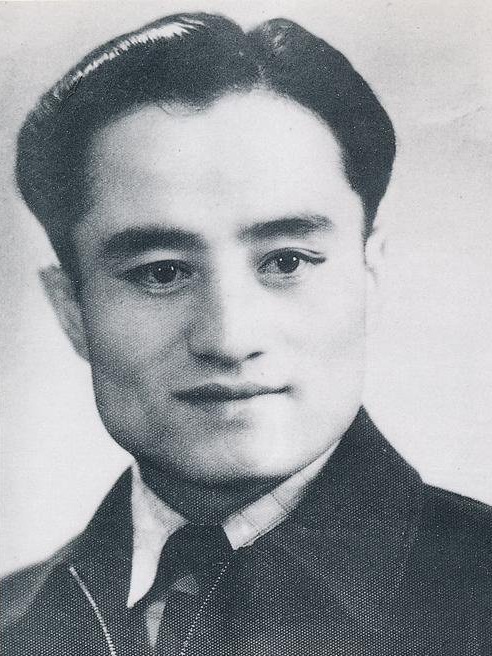
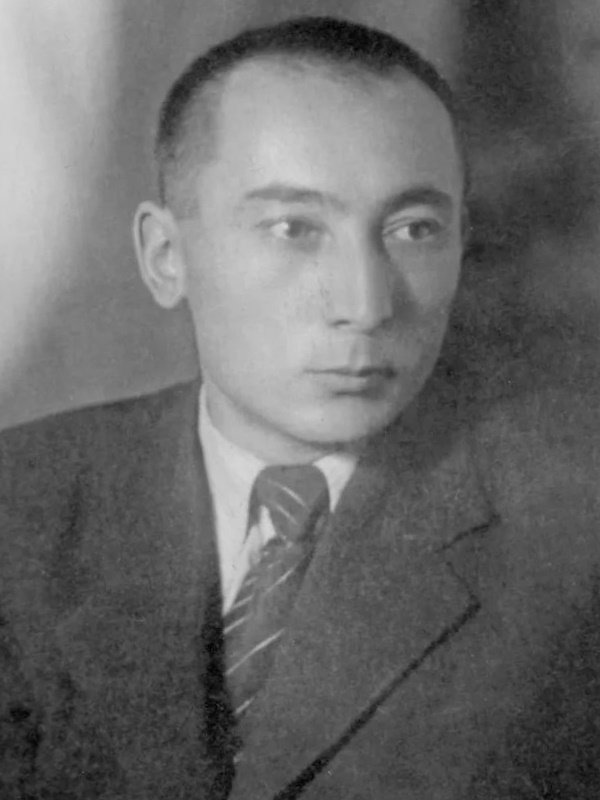
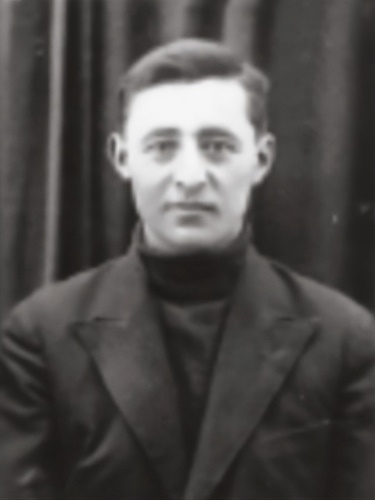
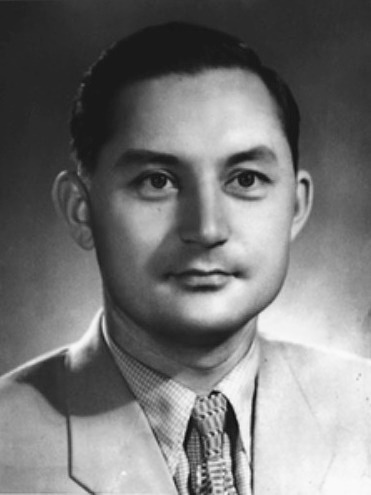
Four of the seven members of the ETRP's Central Executive Committee. Clockwise from the top left: Abdukerim Abbasov, Seypidin Azizi, Asgat Iskhakov, and Muhemmetimin Iminov.

The ETRP's Central Executive Committee (CEC) consisted of seven members: Abdukerim Abbasov, Seydulla Seypullayov, Seypidin Azizi, Asgat Iskhakov, Muhemmetimin Iminov, Anwar Hanbaba, and Abdulla Zakirov. Five of them were also members of the ETRYL's central committee. The CEC was multiethnic; five members were Uyghur, one Tatar (Asgat), and another Uzbek (Anwar). CEC members referred to each other by Uyghur-language code names, the initials of which spelled out the word Lëninchi, meaning "Leninist". Abdukerim led the CEC as its chairman.

Member	Code name	Position
Abdukerim Abbasov	Lutfi	Chairman
Seydulla Seypullayov	Ëldan	Minister for Rural Areas
Seypidin Azizi	Nur	Minister of Communication
Asgat Iskhakov	Ijat	Minister of Organisation
Muhemmetimin Iminov	Nijat	Minister of Military Affairs
Anwar Hanbaba	Cholpan	Minister of Commerce
Abdulla Zakirov	Ilghar	Secretary-General
