= Lateef =

Lateef may refer to:

== People ==
=== Given name ===
- Lateef Adegbite (1933–2012), Nigerian regional Attorney General Nigeria
- Lateef Crowder Dos Santos (born 1977), Brazilian-born American actor
- Lateef Elford-Alliyu (born 1992), English football player
- Lateef Jakande (1929–2021), Nigerian journalist and politician
- Lateef Kayode (born 1983), Nigerian boxer
- Lateef the Truthspeaker (born 1975), American hip hop artist

=== Surname ===
- Ali Lateef, Iraqi footballer
- Fatimah Lateef (born 1966), Singaporean politician
- Riz Lateef (born 1979), British journalist
- Shahid Lateef, retired Pakistan Air Force three-star
- Yusef Lateef (1920–2013), American jazz musician

== Other uses ==
- Lateef (film), 2015 Indian film

== See also ==
- Latif (disambiguation)
