= Latifi (surname) =

Latifi (Persian: لطیفی; adjective form of Latif (Arabic: لطيف)) is an Albanian, Dari, Persian, Moroccan and Tajik Muslim surname.
Notable people with the surname include:

- Ali Latifi (born 1976), Iranian footballer
- Ali Reza Latifi (born 1984), Iranian footballer
- Artan Latifi (born 1983), Kosovan footballer
- Babak Latifi (born 1987), Iranian footballer
- Ebrahim Latifi (born 1939), Iranian footballer
- Habibollah Latifi, Kurdish activist from Iran
- Ilir Latifi (born 1983), Swedish mixed martial artist
- Juliana Latifi (fl. 2016–2020), Albanian judge
- Liridon Latifi (born 1994), Albanian footballer
- Mahmoud Latifi (1929–2005), Iranian herpetologist for whom the snake species Montivipera latifii and the lizard species Microgecko latifi were named
- Majid Latifi (born 1981), Iranian futsal player
- Michael Latifi, Canadian businessman
- Nicholas Latifi (born 1995), Canadian racing driver
- Otakhon Latifi (1936–1998), Tajik journalist and politician
- Meysam Latifi (born 1979), Iranian politician
- Rifat Latifi (born 1955), Kosovar-American surgeon and former Minister of Health of Kosovo
- Smajl Latifi (born 1971), Kosovar politician
- Younes Latifi (born 1984), French rapper
