= Seypidin Azizi =

Chinese politician (1915–2003)

- 赛福鼎·艾则孜; سەيپىدىن ئەزىزى
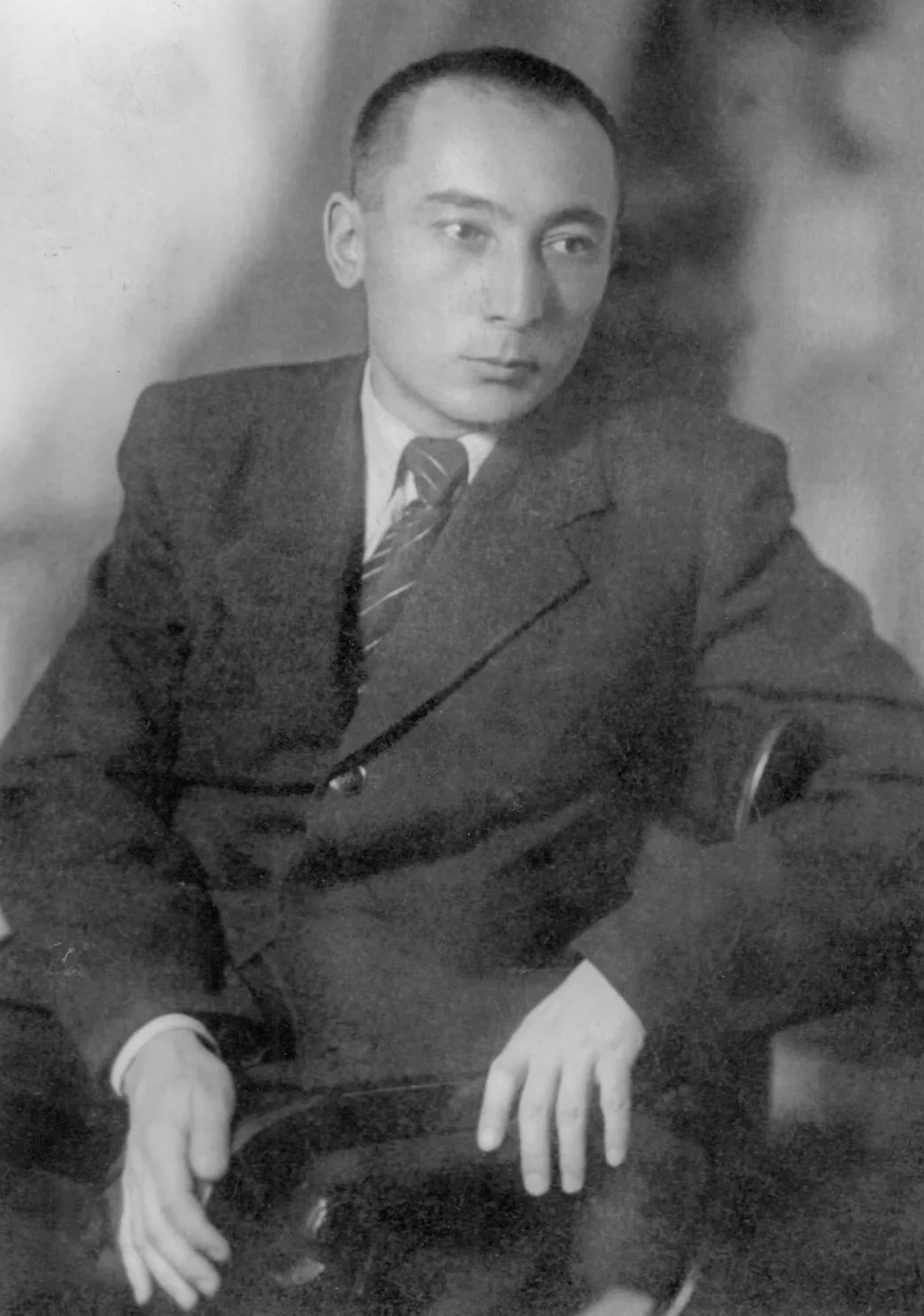
- Azizi in his university years, c. 1930s

CCP Committee Secretary of the Xinjiang Uyghur Autonomous Region
- In office July 1972 – January 1978 (Acting: July 1972 – June 1973)
- Preceded by: Long Shujin
- Succeeded by: Wang Feng

Chairman of the Xinjiang Uyghur Autonomous Regional Revolutionary Committee
- In office October 1955 – January 1967
- Preceded by: Burhan Shahidi (as Governor of Xinjiang)
- Succeeded by: Long Shujin
Other positions
Vice Chairman of the Chinese People's Political Consultative Conference
In office 27 March 1993 – 13 March 1998
Vice Chairman of the Standing Committee of the National People's Congress
In office 27 September 1954 – 27 March 1993
Chairman of the Xinjiang Uyghur Autonomous Regional Political Consultative Conference
In office February 1955 – September 1955
Preceded by	Burhan Shahidi
Succeeded by	Burhan Shahidi
Minister of Education of the East Turkestan Republic
In office 13 March 1945 – 27 June 1946
Preceded by	Habib Yunich

Personal details
- Born: 12 March 1915 Tacheng, Xinjiang Province, Republic of China
- Died: 24 November 2003 (aged 88) Beijing, People's Republic of China
- Resting place: Ürümqi Revolutionary Martyrs Cemetery
- Party: Chinese Communist Party (joined 1949)
- Other political affiliations: All-Union Communist Party (Bolsheviks) (1935–1949); East Turkestan Revolutionary Party (1946–1947); Democratic Revolutionary Party (1947–1948)
- Awards: Order of Liberation (First Class)

Military service
- Allegiance: East Turkestan Republic (1944–1946); People's Republic of China (after 1949)
- Branch/service: East Turkestan (Ili) National Army (1945–1949); People's Liberation Army (after 1949)
- Rank: Lieutenant General of the PLA
- Battles/wars: Ili Rebellion (1944–1946)

Chinese name
- Simplified Chinese: 赛福鼎·艾则孜
- Traditional Chinese: 賽福鼎·艾則孜
Transcriptions
Standard Mandarin
- Hanyu Pinyin: Saìfúdǐng Àizézī
- Wade–Giles: Sai^{4}-fu^{2}-ting^{3} Ai^{4}-tse^{2}-tzu^{1}
- IPA: [sâɪfǔtìŋ âɪtsɤ̌tsɹ̩́]

Uyghur name
- Uyghur: سەيپىدىن ئەزىزى
Transcriptions
- Latin Yëziqi: Seypidin Ezizi
- Yengi Yeziⱪ: Səypidin Əzizi
- SASM/GNC: Säypidin Äzizi
- Siril Yëziqi: Сəйпидин Əзизи

Russian name
- Russian: Сайфутдин Азизов
- Romanization: Sayfutdin Azizov

Seypidin Azizi (Note: Chinese: 赛福鼎·艾则孜; pinyin: Saìfúdǐng Àizézī; Uyghur: سەيپىدىن ئەزىزى, romanized: Seypidin Ezizi; Russian: Сайфутдин Азизов, romanized: Sayfutdin Azizov) (12 March 1915 – 24 November 2003) was a Chinese politician, revolutionary, and educator of Uyghur ethnicity from the western border city of Tacheng. He is best known for his tenure as the first chairman of the Xinjiang Uyghur Autonomous Regional Government. He also occupied top positions at the national level, including Vice Chairperson of the Standing Committee of the National People's Congress and Vice Chairperson of the Chinese People's Political Consultative Conference.

Before the proclamation of the People's Republic of China in 1949, Seypidin was a progressive leader of the Ili Rebellion, which sought to establish an independent East Turkestan. He was the Second East Turkestan Republic's education minister from 1945 to 1946 and a member of the East Turkestan Revolutionary Party's central executive committee from 1946 to 1947.

== Early life and political activities ==
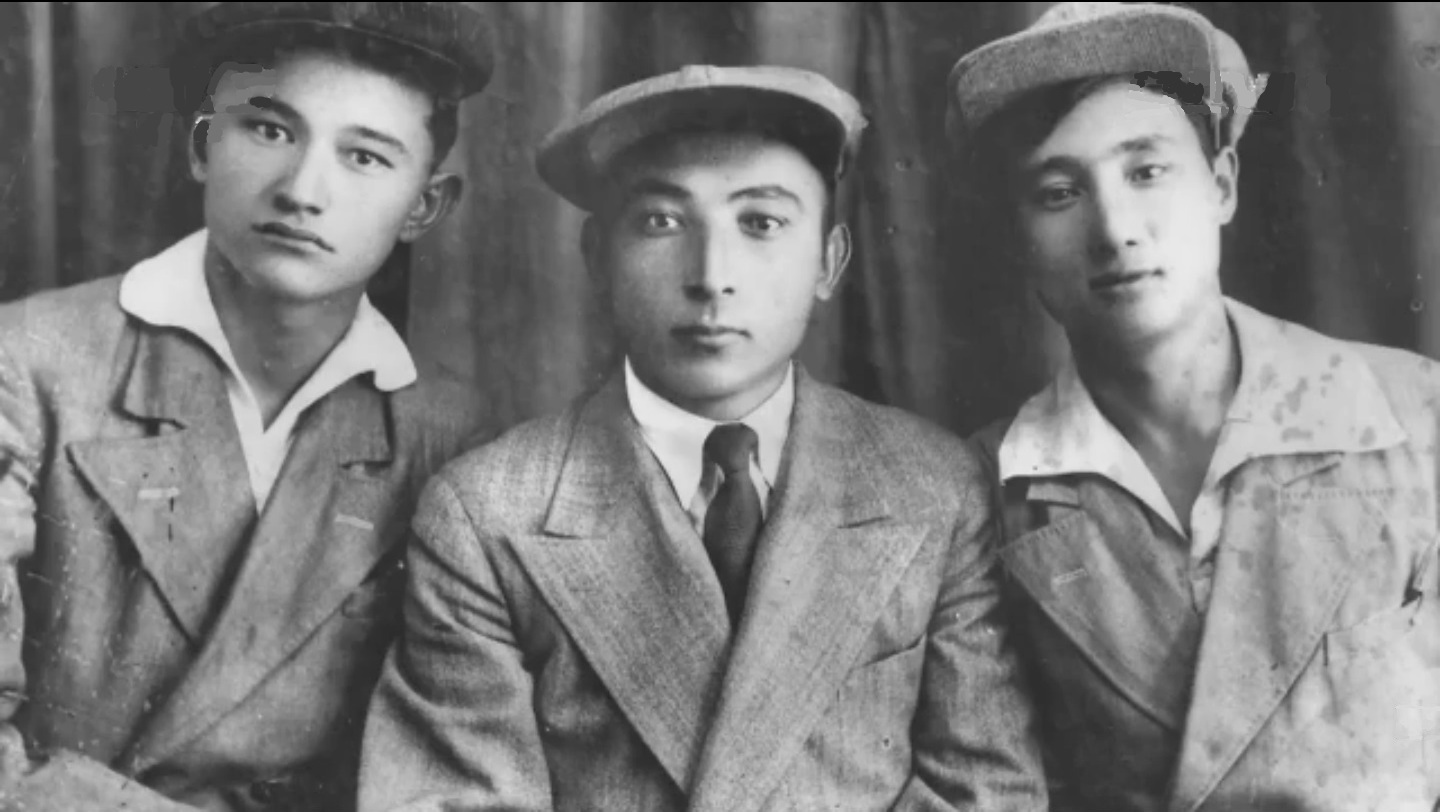
Seypidin (center) studied in the Soviet Union in the 1930s.

Seypidin Azizi was born in the Xinjiang border city of Tacheng to an influential Uyghur trader family originally from Artush. He attended school in Xinjiang and then moved to the Soviet Union in 1935, joining the Communist Party of the Soviet Union and studying at the Central Asia Political Institute in Tashkent, Uzbek SSR. He returned to Xinjiang as a Soviet agent, instigating a Soviet-backed rebellion against the Kuomintang's Republic of China government in 1937. He was deemed a "radical young man" by the Chinese warlord Sheng Shicai, who controlled most of that area at the time, resulting in his exile back to Tacheng. Following the onset of the Second Sino-Japanese War, he advocated resistance against Japan and was appointed as the secretary-general and vice-president of the Tacheng Uyghur Culture Promotion Association (Chinese: 塔城维吾尔文化促进会). He was apprehended by the Kuomintang in Tacheng during the celebration of International Labor Day on 1 May. He continued his resistance while incarcerated, prompting the Kuomintang to free him during a large-scale protest march.

== Second East Turkestan Republic ==
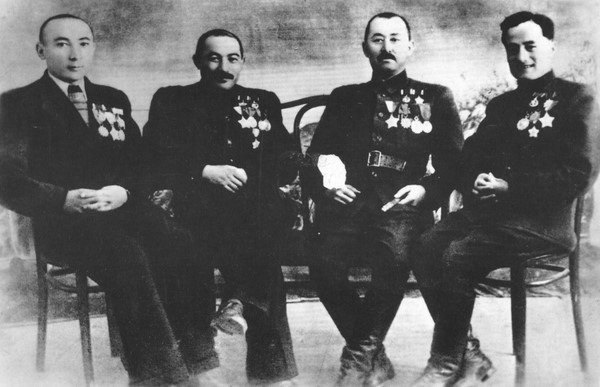
Four leaders of the East Turkestan Republic in 1944; Seypidin is on the far left.

In 1944, Seypidin participated in the Ili Rebellion (known as the Three Districts Revolution in Chinese histography) that broke out in the districts of Ili, Tacheng and Altay, in opposition to the Kuomintang's rule. The East Turkestan Republic was subsequently proclaimed, with Seypidin serving in a number of roles in its government, including as education minister. He led the Kashgar contingent of the East Turkestan National Army and commanded the regiment in numerous engagements. He was involved in the establishment of the East Turkestan Revolutionary Youth League in 1946 and held the positions of central committee member and head of the publicity department. Following the establishment of the East Turkestan Revolutionary Party that same year, he emerged as a principal leader and the head of the publicity department, as well as a delegate in peace negotiations with the ROC. The negotiations led to the formation of the Coalition Government of Xinjiang Province in 1946, leading to the reformation of the ETR to the Ili District Council.

Seypidin was the director of the education department within the coalition government, as well as the chairman of the Democratic Election Supervisory Group. In November 1946, delegates from the three districts approached representatives of the Chinese Communist Party (CCP) and formally sought acceptance of the communist leadership. In August 1947, the Xinjiang League for the Defense of Peace and Democracy was founded, and Seypidin was appointed vice-chairman of the league, head of the publicity department, and editor-in-chief of the Forward Newspaper. He subsequently held the positions of acting chairman and chairman of the Xinjiang League for the Defense of Peace and Democracy.

== People's Republic of China ==
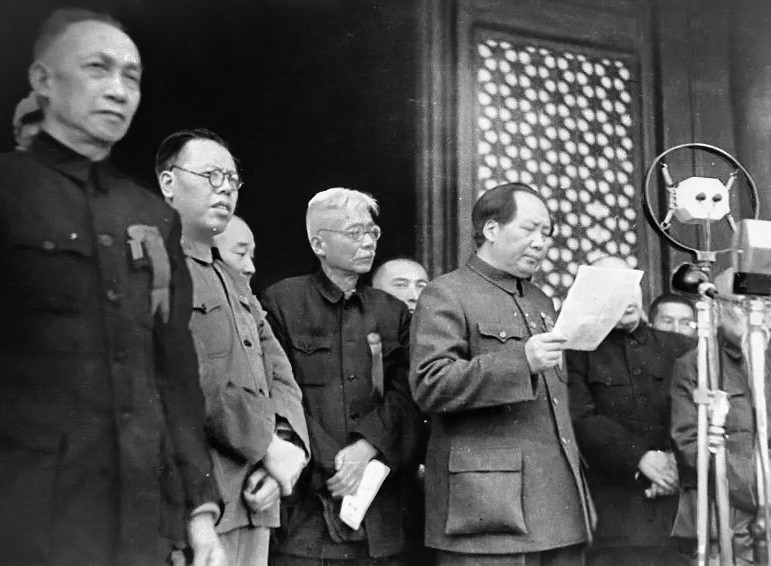
Seypidin standing behind Mao Zedong at the proclamation of the People's Republic of China on 1 October 1949

In September 1949, Seypidin attended the Chinese People's Political Consultative Conference endorsed by the CCP, becoming a member of the new communist government. On 15 October 1949, Seypidin filed his application for membership to the CCP, in accordance with the recommendation of Mao Zedong himself. He joined the CCP on 27 December. Simultaneously, he was designated vice chairman of the People's Government of Xinjiang Province, director of the Xinjiang Ethnic Affairs Committee, and deputy commander of the Xinjiang Military Region.

From December 1949 through January 1950, Seypidin accompanied Mao and Zhou Enlai in their trip to Moscow to negotiate the Sino-Soviet Treaty of Friendship, where he participated in the negotiation, preparation, and signing ceremony. In December 1950, he accompanied Wang Zhen to the Junggar Basin and other desolate areas to identify locations for military reclamation units, thereby establishing the groundwork for the deployment of troops in Xinjiang and the formation and advancement of the Xinjiang Production and Construction Corps (commonly known as Bingtuan).

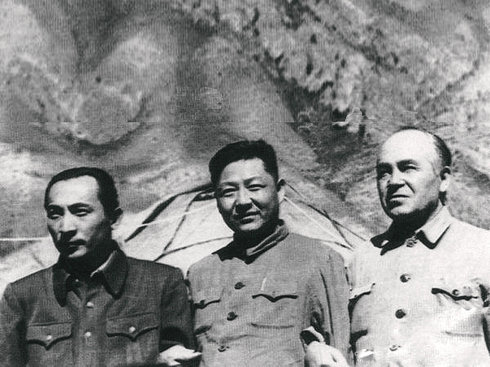
Seypidin, Xi Zhongxun (father of Xi Jinping), and Burhan Shahidi in 1952

In 1951, Seypidin was designated as a member of the Standing Committee of the Xinjiang Branch of the CCP Central Committee, minister of the Nationalities Department, minister of the United Front Work Department, and principal of the Xinjiang Provincial Cadre School. In July 1952, he was designated as the fourth secretary of the CCP Central Committee Xinjiang Branch. In September 1952, he was appointed deputy director of the Xinjiang Preparatory Committee for the Implementation of Regional Ethnic Autonomy, and in January 1953, he assumed the role of vice-chairman of the Northwest Administrative Committee. In August 1953, he was appointed as the third secretary of the CCP Committee and deputy commander of the Xinjiang Military Region; in December 1954, he ascended to the position of the second secretary of the CCP Committee and deputy commander of the Xinjiang Military Region.

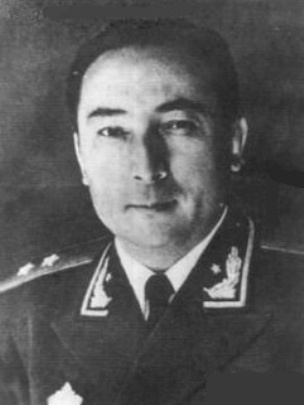
Seypidin in PLA uniform

In February 1955, the Xinjiang Autonomous Region Political Consultative Conference was founded, and he assumed the role of chairman. In this year, he was given the rank of Lieutenant General of the PLA. On 1 October, he registered with Mao his strong objection to proposals to name Xinjiang the "Xinjiang Autonomous Region", arguing that "autonomy is not given to mountains and rivers. It is given to particular nationalities" (i.e. ethnicities; see minzu). The CCP Central Committee endorsed Seypidin's proposal, leading to the establishment of the Xinjiang Uyghur Autonomous Region. He served as a member of the Northwest Bureau of the CCP Central Committee and held the position of third secretary of the CCP Xinjiang Autonomous Region. He advanced land reform in Xinjiang and implemented trial projects in Kashgar Prefecture, with successful outcomes. He participated in directing Xinjiang's three-year national economic recovery efforts and the execution of the nation's inaugural five-year plan, contributing significantly towards the fulfillment of socialist transformation in Xinjiang and its swift progression to extensive socialist economic development.

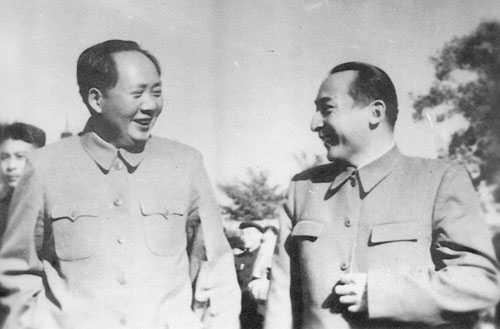
Mao and Seypidin

In 1958, he assumed the position of second secretary of the CCP Xinjiang Uygur Autonomous Region Committee. He fervently championed and endorsed the operation of educational institutions, formed Xinjiang classes at the Central Party School, and dispatched foreign students to the Soviet Union, therefore educating a substantial number of cadres for the development of Xinjiang. He founded a flight school that trained the inaugural group of ethnic-minority pilots for Xinjiang, and in 1962, during the Yi–Ta incident in the border regions of Xinjiang, he participated in efforts to restore calm and stability as directed by Mao and Zhou.

After 1968, he held the positions of deputy director of the Revolutionary Committee of the Xinjiang Uygur Autonomous Region (XUAR), deputy head of the core leading group of the Xinjiang Revolutionary Committee. Seypidin began working in the Chinese capital Beijing in February 1978, and held the position of vice chairman of the Standing Committee of the fifth, sixth, and seventh National People's Congresses.

He died in Beijing on 24 November 2003, and was interred at the Ürümqi Revolutionary Martyrs Cemetery in accordance with Uyghur customs.

== Legacy ==
In 2017, the US-based Radio Free Asia reported that authorities in Xinjiang had issued a "special directive" to bookstores to remove books by Seypidin, including his memoir The Epics of Life and his biographic memoir of Abdukerim Abbasov, The Eagle of Tian Shan.

== Notes ==
Government offices
Preceded by Burhan Shahidi	Chairman of Xinjiang; 1955–1967	Succeeded by Long Shujin
Preceded by Long Shujin	Chairman of Xinjiang; 1972–1978	Succeeded by Wang Feng
Party political offices
Preceded by Long Shujin	Secretary of the CCP Xinjiang Committee; 1972–1978	Succeeded by Wang Feng
