= Latifa (disambiguation) =

Latifa is a feminine given name, of Arabic origins.

Latifa or Latifah may also refer to:

- Latifa (singer) (Latifa Bint Alaya El Arfaoui, born 1961), Tunisian pop music singer
- Latifa School for Girls, in Dubai
- Latifa, an organ of spiritual perception in Naqshbandi
- Queen Latifah (Dana Elaine Owens, born 1970), American singer, actress and producer
- Latifa Al Maktoum (disambiguation), the name of several princesses from Dubai

== See also ==
- Latif (disambiguation)
- Latife, a Turkish name
