= Nijat =

Nijat may refer to

- Nijat (given name)
- Nijat Abasov, Azerbaijani chess grandmaster
- Nijat Mamedov, Azerbaijani chess grandmaster
- Nijat Sirel, Turkish sculptor
- Operation Rah-e-Nijat, a 2009 military operation in Pakistan
