= Xinjiang League for the Defense of Peace and Democracy =

Communist organisation in Xinjiang, China (1948–1949)

- Chairman: Ehmetjan Qasimi
- Vice Chairmen: Asgat Iskhakov; Seypidin Azizi
- Spokesman: Abdukerim Abbasov
- Founded: 1 August 1948
- Dissolved: March 1950
- Merger of: Several leftist groups, chiefly the Democratic Revolutionary Party
- Merged into: Xinjiang People's Democratic League
- Ideology: Communism; Marxism–Leninism; Anti–East Turkestan independence
- Political position: Far-left
- National affiliation: Chinese Communist Party

Xinjiang League for the Defense of Peace and Democracy
- Simplified Chinese: 新疆保卫和平民主同盟
- Traditional Chinese: 新疆保衛和平民主同盟
Transcriptions
Standard Mandarin
- Hanyu Pinyin: Xīnjiāng Bǎowèi Hépíng Mínzhǔ Tóngméng

The Xinjiang League for the Defense of Peace and Democracy, also known simply as the Xinjiang League, was a pro–Chinese Communist Party (CCP) political organisation active in Xinjiang, China, during the waning years of the Chinese Civil War and Chinese Communist Revolution. It was led by former progressive leaders of the Second East Turkestan Republic and Coalition Government of Xinjiang Province, including Ehmetjan Qasimi (as chairman), Asgat Iskhakov, Seypidin Azizi, and Abdukerim Abbasov.

The Xinjiang League was formed on 1 August 1948 by 30 representatives of various leftist groups, chief among them the Democratic Revolutionary Party, the founding of which had been encouraged by the CCP. At its first and only congress in March 1950, the Xinjiang League voted to transform itself into the Xinjiang People's Democratic League.
