= Communist League of Xinjiang =

Communist organisation in China (1944–1947)

- Secretary: Zhao Xinya
- Founded: 7 November 1944
- Dissolved: 3 February 1947
- Merged into: Democratic Revolutionary Party
- Headquarters: Dihua (Ürümqi)
- Newspaper: Combat (Note: simplified Chinese: 战斗; traditional Chinese: 戰鬥; pinyin: Zhàndòu)
- Ideology: Communism; Marxism–Leninism
- Political position: Far-left

Communist League of Xinjiang
- Simplified Chinese: 新疆共产主义者同盟
- Traditional Chinese: 新疆共產主義者同盟
Transcriptions
Standard Mandarin
- Hanyu Pinyin: Xīnjiāng Gòngchǎn zhǔyì zhě Tóngméng

The Communist League of Xinjiang (Note: simplified Chinese: 新疆共产主义者同盟; traditional Chinese: 新疆共產主義者同盟; pinyin: Xīnjiāng Gòngchǎn zhǔyì zhě Tóngméng; also translated as the Xinjiang Communist League or Xinjiang League of Communists.) was a clandestine communist organisation active in Xinjiang, China, from 1944 to 1947. Based in the regional capital of Dihua (Ürümqi), it had a Han Chinese-majority membership, in contrast to the contemporary East Turkestan Revolutionary Party, which had a Uyghur-majority membership. After consulting with the Chinese Communist Party, the two groups voted to merge and form the Democratic Revolutionary Party.

== History ==
On 7 November 1944, Zhang Zhiyuan, Zhao Pulin, and Wang Ducong – students of Xinjiang University – and Zhang Yuzhen – a student of the Xinjiang Provincial Girls' Middle School – formed the clandestine Xinjiang Communist League Society. (Note: simplified Chinese: 新疆共产主义者同盟社; traditional Chinese: 新疆共產主義者同盟社; pinyin: Xīnjiāng Gòngchǎn zhǔyì zhě Tóngméng Shè) Inspired by the Chinese Communist Party (CCP), their goals were to promote Mao Zedong's concept of a "New Democratic Revolution", establish contact with like-minded communist revolutionaries in northern Xinjiang (the three districts of Ili, Tarbaghatay, and Altay), and jointly overthrow the then Kuomintang-led government of the Republic of China. Many members had personal contacts within the CCP. The organisation established its headquarters in the regional capital of Dihua (present-day Ürümqi) and elected Han Shiyi as its president.

In December 1944, a group of young writers for the Xinjiang Daily, including Li Taiyu, Zhao Xinya, Yu Jiangzhi, and He Rui, formed another clandestine organisation called the "Communist Group". In March 1945, the Communist Group merged into the Xinjiang Communist League Association, and the organisation was renamed the "Communist League of Xinjiang". Zhao Xinya was elected as party secretary and Li Taiyu as propaganda committee member. It began publishing the gazette Combat, leading to the organisation's informal moniker "Combat Society".

In December 1946, Abdukerim Abbasov – the leader of the Uyghur-majority, Ghulja-based East Turkestan Revolutionary Party (ETRP) – travelled to the then Chinese capital Nanjing, to secretly meet with Dong Biwu, a CCP delegate from Yan'an. Abdukerim explained to Dong that the ETRP had been working closely with the Communist League, and claimed that together they numbered in the tens-of-thousands. Both groups hoped to integrate their membership into the CPSU, but the Soviet leadership had not yet received their request. Abdukerim therefore reached out to the CCP for its support. Dong immediately relayed this information back to the CCP central committee in Yan'an via telegraph and scheduled a second meeting with Abdukerim. At their second meeting, Dong provided Abdukerim documents from the CCP's 7th National Congress and the opinions of the CCP leadership. Dong extended the warm greetings of Zhou Enlai, the vice chairman of the military commission of the central committee, who agreed in principle to CCP membership for leaders of the Communist League and the ETRP.

Abdukerim returned to Ghulja in early 1947 and immediately made arrangements to meet with the leaders of the Communist League. On 3 February 1947, the leaders of the Communist League and the ETRP met in Dihua. Abdukerim informed the attendees of the CCP central committee's opinions and recommendations, and the two groups agreed to a CCP-recommended merger. The dissolution of both groups and the formation of the Democratic Revolutionary Party were declared later that day.
