= Abdukerim Abbasov =

Uyghur politician (1921–1949)

- ئابدۇكىرىم ئابباسوۋ; 阿不都克里木·阿巴索夫
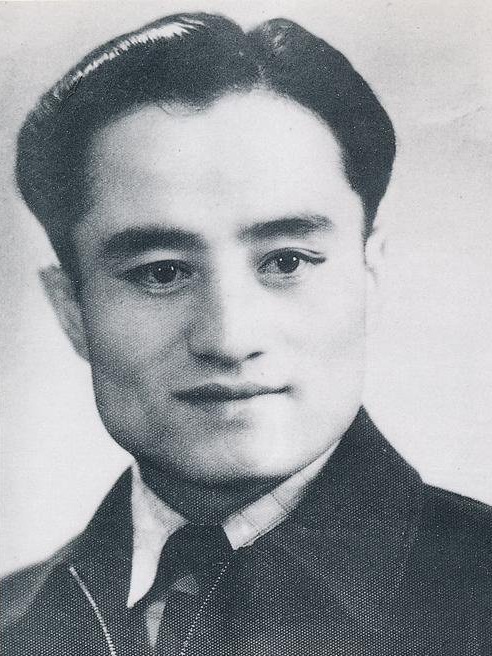

Deputy Secretary-General of the Coalition Government of Xinjiang Province
- In office 1 July 1946 – 12 August 1947

Internal Affairs Minister of the East Turkestan Republic
- In office 18 November 1944 – 13 March 1945

Personal details
- Born: 1921 Przhevalsk, Russian SFSR, Soviet Union
- Died: 27 August 1949 (aged 27–28) Kabansk, Russian SFSR, Soviet Union
- Party: East Turkestan Revolutionary Party (1946–1947); Democratic Revolutionary Party (1947); Xinjiang League (from 1947)
- Spouse: Lü Suxin (m. 1946)
- Children: 2 sons and 1 daughter (Khadija Abbasova)

Military service
- Allegiance: East Turkestan Republic
- Branch/service: East Turkestan National Army
- Years of service: 1945–1949
- Rank: Lieutenant Colonel
- Battles/wars: Ili Rebellion

Uyghur name
- Uyghur: ئابدۇكىرىم ئابباسوۋ
Transcriptions
- Latin Yëziqi: Abdukirim Abbasov
- Yengi Yeziⱪ: Abdukirim Abbasov
- Siril Yëziqi: Абдукирим Аббасов

Chinese name
- Chinese: 阿不都克里木·阿巴索夫
Transcriptions
Standard Mandarin
- Hanyu Pinyin: Ābùdūkèlǐmù Ābāsuǒfū

Russian name
- Russian: Абдулкерим Аббасов
- Romanization: Abdulkerim Abbasov

Abdukerim Abbasov (Note: Uyghur: ئابدۇكىرىم ئابباسوۋ, romanized: Abdukirim Abbasof; Chinese: 阿不都克里木·阿巴索夫; pinyin: Ābùdūkèlǐmù Ābāsuǒfū; Russian: Абдулкерим Аббасов, romanized: Abdulkerim Abbasov) (1921 – 27 August 1949) was a Uyghur politician, revolutionary, and educator who was active in Xinjiang, China, during the early 20th century. He was one of the leaders of the Ili Rebellion of 1944, which resulted in the founding of the Second East Turkestan Republic (ETR) in northern Xinjiang. Abdukerim, along with Ehmetjan Qasimi, led the Marxist faction within the ETR, which in 1946 set aside the rebellion's declaration of independence and joined the Chinese nationalists in forming a provincial coalition government.

Abdukerim and Ehmetjan led the ETR faction which joined the Chinese communists toward the end of the Chinese Civil War. They and several other senior leaders of the ETR perished in August 1949 in a plane crash while traveling en route to Beiping (Beijing) where they were invited to participate in the Chinese communists' political consultative conference, which resulted in the founding of the People's Republic of China. Abdukerim is officially hailed in the People's Republic of China as a revolutionary martyr.

== Biography ==
=== Early life ===
Abdukerim Abbasov was born in 1921 in Przhevalsk, Soviet Union, now Karakol, Kyrgyzstan. His family's ancestral home is Artush in the far west of Xinjiang, and in 1926 they moved to Ghulja (Yining). Abdukerim attended primary school in Uqturpan (Wushi) in southern Xinjiang and then enrolled in the Xinjiang Province No. 1 Middle School in the provincial capital, Dihua (now Ürümqi) in 1936. The school was one of the first modern multiethnic schools in the region. Abdukerim began to learn Chinese and joined an anti-imperialist society organized by Chinese Communist Party (CCP) members. In 1937, he met Seypidin Azizi, who had returned from exile in the Soviet Union and gave him books on Marxism–Leninism. In August 1938, Abdukerim enrolled in the High School of the Xinjiang Academy and studied under political science teacher, Lin Jilu, who was a Chinese communist. Liu tutored Abdukerim in Chinese and Mao Zedong's writings. Abdukerim also learned about the guerilla warfare tactics of the Chinese Red Army and the Long March. In 1939, he participated in the Xinjiang Academy Summer Tour Group to Ili, organized by the academy's president Du Chongyuan, and toured his home region with Chinese communists.

At that time, Sheng Shicai, the Soviet-friendly, Chinese warlord who ruled of Xinjiang, shifted his political allegiance to the Chinese Nationalist government, and launched a crackdown on communist and pro-Soviet activities. Abdukerim's father was arrested and Abdukerim was expelled from school and sent to teach at a primary school in Shawan County in the Dzungar Basin of northern Xinjiang. In Shawan, he translated Mao Zedong's essay On Protracted War into Uyghur. In 1942, he was permitted to return home to Ghulja where he initially taught at the Ili High School for Girls and then served as an interpreter for the local government.

=== Ili Rebellion ===
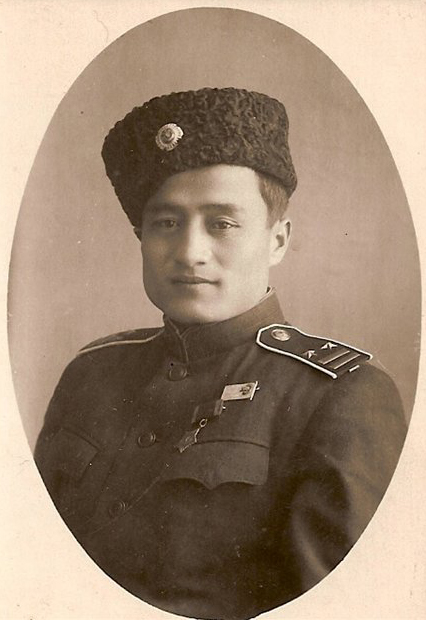
Abdukerim in his East Turkestan National Army uniform c. 1945

In April 1944, Abdukerim, along with the influential Ghulja imam Elihan Tore and Rahimjan Sabir Khoja, formed the 12-person Ghulja Liberation Organization to free the region of Chinese Nationalist rule. To evade government surveillance, Abdukerim relocated to Korgas where he received assistance and materiel from the Soviet Union. In September 1944, Sheng tried to seek the Soviets' favor again and was recalled from Xinjiang by the Chinese Nationalist government. Sheng's recall left a power vacuum and several rebellions sprang out in northern Xinjiang.

In October 1944, Abdukerim returned to Ghulja with a guerilla force and, on 7 November 1944, launched the Ili Rebellion. Abdukerim and Soviet advisor Peter Romanovich Alexandrov led 60 men in seizing the bridge over the Ili River. Chinese Nationalist troops sent to retake the bridge were ambushed and the city was effectively cut off from Chinese Nationalist reinforcements. Other rebel forces from Nilka fought their way into the city and quickly seized control. Nationalists strongholds were taken with the support of Soviet warplanes and artillery. After taking Ghulja, the revolutionaries massacred large numbers of Chinese Nationalist prisoners of war and Han Chinese residents.

The revolution drew support from Islamists, Pan-Turkic nationalists, and Marxists, and spread to Ili, Tarbaghatay (Tacheng) and Ashan (Altay). On 11 November 1944, the revolutionaries founded the Second East Turkestan Republic in Ghulja with Elihan Tore as its president. Abdukerim Abbasov was appointed its interior minister.

Unlike the Islamists and Turkic nationalists who wanted to create a pan-Turkic regime in Xinjiang, Abdukerim regarded the revolution as a struggle against Chinese Nationalist repression and capitalist exploitation of the working-class people of all ethnicities. He opposed a proposal to forcibly move all Han Chinese from Ghulja to internment camps in Künes County. He issued orders protecting Han Chinese residents in Ili and moved the families of Han friends and associates into his house for their protection. After fighting ceased in Ghulja, the ETR government, at his direction, created a Han Affairs Office to assist Han Chinese residents, published a Chinese-language newspaper, reopened the Han Chinese primary school, and founded an orphanage for Han Chinese children.

On 8 April 1945, the various guerilla and partisan units of the revolution were organized into the East Turkestan National Army (ETNA) and Abdukerim became its political director. The ETNA was a multiethnic army led by Uyghurs, Kazakhs, Kyrgyz and Russians, with Hui, Mongol and Xibe cavalry brigades, as well as some Han Chinese recruits. With the support of Soviet advisors and military personnel, the ETNA launched a series of offensives to expand ETR control beyond the Ili Valley.

In July, Abdukerim led the southern prong of the ETNA's breakout offensive toward Aksu. Abdukerim's forces captured the passes through the Tian Shan mountains that connect the Ili Valley with the Tarim Basin in August, and took Baicheng on 2 September and Wensu on 6 September.

After the Chinese Nationalist government and the Soviet Union concluded the Sino-Soviet Treaty of Friendship and Alliance on 14 August 1945, the Soviets ceased their support for the ETR and ETNA. To improve the ETR's political bargaining position, Elihan Tore ordered the ETNA to accelerate attacks in early September.

Abdukerim surrounded Aksu the on 7 September, but Chinese Nationalist defenders led by Zhao Hanqi fought back fiercely and broke the siege on 13 September. Abdukerim's brother, Siyiti, and other ETR political activists imprisoned inside Aksu, were executed by Chinese Nationalist authorities. In mid-September, Abdukerim resumed the siege with reinforcements from the Soviet advisor Nasyrov and Tore's son, but after weeks of desperate fighting, was forced to abandon the campaign on 6 October. Six days later, the ETR and the Chinese nationalists began peace talks in Dihua. In February 1946, they reached a peace accord.

=== Coalition government ===
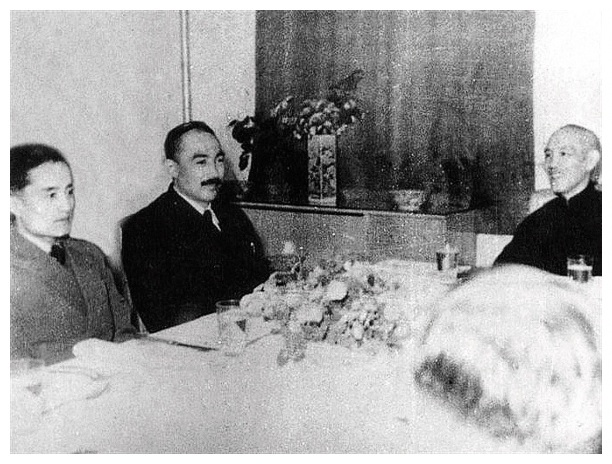
Abdukerim with Ehmetjan Qasimi and Chiang Kai-shek in Nanjing on 22 November 1946

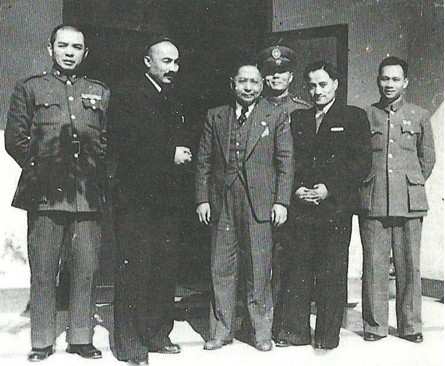
Abdukerim with Ehmetjan and Sun Fo, the son of Sun Yat-sen, in Nanjing on 24 November 1946

In July 1946, after further negotiations between Zhang Zhizhong of the Chinese Nationalist government and Ehmetjan Qasimi of the ETR, the two sides agreed to form a provincial coalition government with Zhang as chairman and Ehmetjan as vice-chairman. Abdukerim Abbasov was appointed as deputy secretary-general. Abdukerim and Ehmetjan agreed to set aside the ETR's assertions of independence, leading its reformation to the Ili District Council. Elihan Tore was exiled from Xinjiang and forcibly moved to the Soviet Union. In December 1946, Abdukerim attended the Chinese National Assembly in Nanjing as a delegate from Xinjiang.

While in Nanjing, Abdukerim met secretly with Dong Biwu, a CCP delegate from Yan'an, and asked for CCP support. He explained that the Communist League of Xinjiang had 15,000 members and its leadership had sought to join the Communist Party of the Soviet Union but did not receive permission to do so. Dong immediately cabled Zhou Enlai, who replied that the CCP would welcome cooperation with the Communist League of Xinjiang and would agree in principle to CCP membership for leaders of the league. Abdukerim returned to Xinjiang with documents from the CCP's 7th National Congress, as well as radio equipment to contact the CCP with. The radio, however, was not sufficiently powerful to reach Yan'an from Xinjiang and the two communist groups could not establish regular communication. Back in Xinjiang, under Abdukerim's leadership, two Marxist organizations, the East Turkestan Revolutionary Party and the Communist League of Xinjiang merged to form the Democratic Revolutionary Party. Abdukerim became the chair of the DRP's central committee.

In 1947, after Zhang Zhizhong left the province, relations between the Ili District Council and Chinese nationalists deteriorated under the chairmanship of Masud Sabri, whom the Council leaders regarded as anti-Soviet. As full-scale civil war broke out between the Chinese nationalists and Chinese communists in China proper, and the Chinese nationalists persuaded Osman Batur, a Kazakh military leader, to defect from the ETR. Thereafter, Abdukerim and Ehmetjan returned to Ghulja from Dihua and openly supported the Chinese communists. On 1 August 1947, they founded the Xinjiang League for the Defense of Peace and Democracy, which incorporated the DRP and other leftist groups in Ghulja. Ehmetjan was the chair of the group and Abdukerim served as a member of its central committee. The coalition government with the Chinese nationalists subsequently broke down, leading to the reformation of the Ili District Council to the Three Districts Economic Commission.

In February 1948, Abdukerim propagated Mao Zedong's People's Liberation Army Proclamation and Disciplinary Code in Uyghur to the Ili National Army. As the Chinese communists turned the tide of the civil war against the Chinese nationalists, Abdukerim moved the Three Districts Economic Commission closer to the CCP. In May 1949, he reportedly announced:

We categorically assert that the success of the People's Liberation Army alone rendered possible the victory of our own movement ... Only the victory of the national liberation struggle of the entire Chinese people can lead to the full freedom of the people of Xinjiang; only then will the correct solution of the national question in Xinjiang be reached.

In the late summer of 1949, after Liu Shaoqi visited Moscow in June and persuaded Soviet leader Joseph Stalin to facilitate the transfer of Xinjiang through political means to the CCP, Deng Liqun arrived in Ghulja on 17 August to establish contact with the Three Districts leadership. Deng met with Abdukerim and Ehmetjan and conveyed Mao's invitation to the political consultative conference in Beiping (Beijing), which the ETR leaders accepted.

=== Death ===
According to Chinese state sources, Abdukerim and Ehmetjan, along with Ishaq Beg Munonov, Dalelkhan Sugirbayev, and Luo Zhi departed Ghulja for Beiping on 22 August 1949. They traveled by car to Almaty and on 23 August 1949 flew to Novosibirsk, where they were delayed by reports of inclement weather. The delegation, not wishing to miss the conference in Beiping, reportedly insisted on continuing the journey and departed Novosibirsk on 25 August 1949. The plane crashed in poor weather in the Transbaikal region on 26 August 1949 and all aboard perished. Abdukerim Abbasov was 28 years old.

News of the crash reached Ghulja on 3 September 1949 and Seypidin Azizi led another Three Districts government delegation to Beiping on 7 September 1949. This delegation flew from Ghulja to Chita and then reached Beiping on 15 September by train via Manzhouli and Shenyang.

== Personal life ==
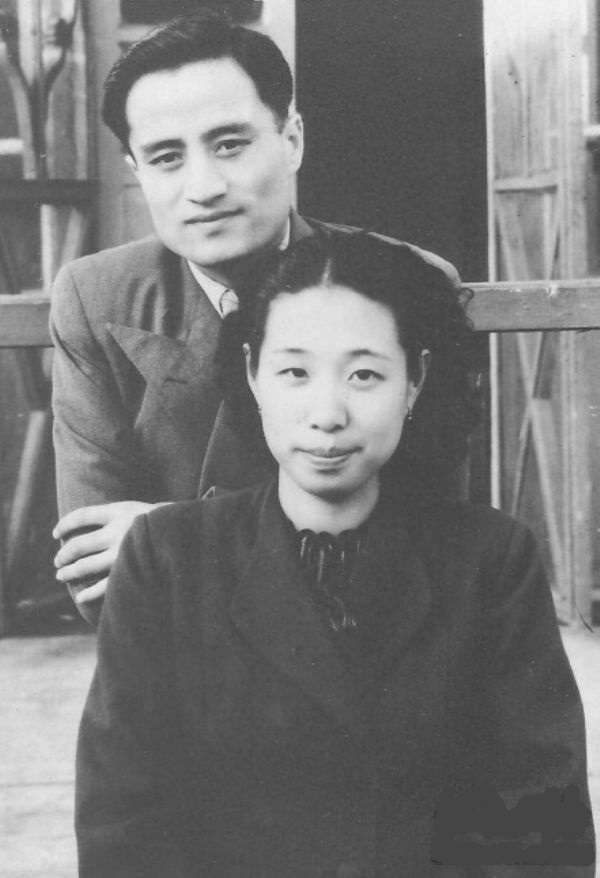
Abdukerim and his wife Lü Suxin

While Abdukerim was working at the Middle School for Girls in Ghulja, he fell in love with Yang Fengyi (楊鳳儀), a colleague, despite Uyghur tradition against relationships outside of the Islamic faith and the disapproval of Yang's father, who was the head of the local Han merchants' association. During the Ili Rebellion, Abdukerim sheltered the Yang family inside his home. When Abdukerim fell ill, Yang nursed him for 40 days back to health. In the spring of 1945, as fighting between the Chinese Nationalists and the ETNA intensified, Yang felt extreme familial and societal pressure. In April 1945, Yang committed suicide using Abdukerim's pistol. In a farewell letter to Abdukerim, she explained that she was a person who looked past ethnic divisions, but she could not tolerate the atrocities committed around her. She wrote that she had died for him, asked him to protect her family, and urged him to live on "for me, for the revolution, and for the people of all nationalities in Xinjiang". Abdukerim was heartbroken by Yang's death and immediately ordered strict bans against the killings of civilians.

After Yang's death, Abdukerim married Lü Suxin (呂素新), a student of Yang's, in February 1946. The couple had two sons and one daughter.

== Legacy ==
In the People's Republic of China, Abdukerim is remembered as a martyr and hero in the struggle against the Chinese Nationalist government. His remains were returned to China in April 1950 and later reburied in a martyrs' memorial cemetery in Ghulja. The cemetery has a stele with calligraphy by Mao Zedong, praising Abdukerim and his fellow martyrs for their contributions to the Chinese Communist Revolution and mourning their deaths en route to the inaugural Chinese People's Political Consultative Conference in Beiping.
