= Democratic Revolutionary Party (Xinjiang) =

1947–1948 communist party in Xinjiang, China

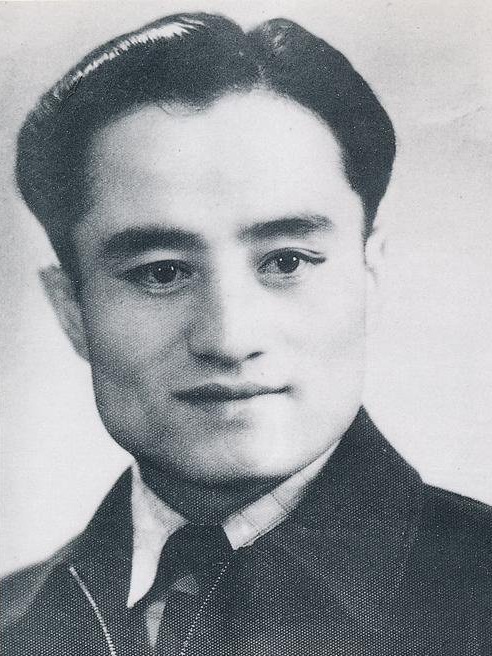
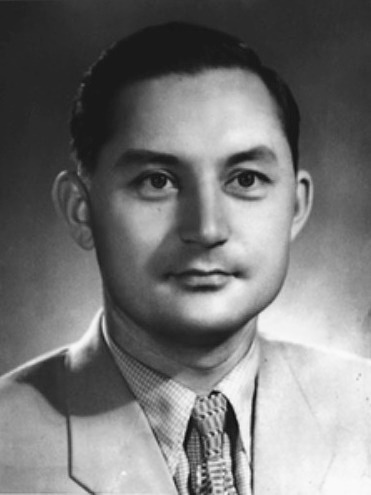
- Chairman Abdukerim Abbasov (left) and Vice Chairman Asgat Iskhakov (right)
- Chairman: Abdukerim Abbasov
- Vice Chairmen: Asgat Iskhakov; Li Taiyu (Note: Chinese: 李泰玉; pinyin: Lǐ Tàiyù)
- Founded: 3 February 1947
- Dissolved: July 1948
- Merger of: Communist League of Xinjiang; East Turkestan Revolutionary Party
- Merged into: Xinjiang League for the Defense of Peace and Democracy
- Headquarters: Dihua (Ürümqi); Ghulja (Yining)
- Newspaper: Democratic News (Note: simplified Chinese: 民主报; traditional Chinese: 民主報; pinyin: Mínzhǔ Bào)
- Ideology: Communism; Marxism–Leninism; Anti–East Turkestan independence
- Political position: Far-left

Democratic Revolutionary Party
- Simplified Chinese: 民主革命党
- Traditional Chinese: 民主革命黨
Transcriptions
Standard Mandarin
- Hanyu Pinyin: Mínzhǔ Gémìng Dǎng

The Democratic Revolutionary Party (Note: simplified Chinese: 民主革命党; traditional Chinese: 民主革命黨; pinyin: Mínzhǔ Gémìng Dǎng; also translated as the Party of the Democratic Revolution.) was a communist party active in Xinjiang, China, from 1947 to 1948. It was formed from a merger between the Han Chinese–majority Communist League of Xinjiang and the Uyghur-majority East Turkestan Revolutionary Party. The Chinese Communist Party, after multiple meetings with the latter organization's leader Abdukerim Abbasov, recommended the merger.

Its chairman was Abdukerim, and its vice chairmen were Asgat Iskhakov and Li Taiyu. The party published a newspaper called Democratic News.

In July 1948, the party merged with a number of other leftist groups in Xinjiang to form the Xinjiang League for the Defense of Peace and Democracy.
