= Abdulla Zakirov =

Chinese politician (1918–1981)

- 阿不都拉·扎克洛夫; ئابدۇللا زاكىروف
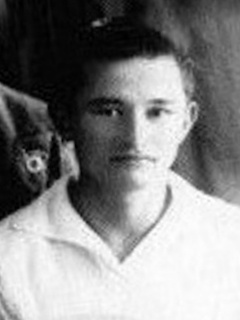
- Abdulla, c. 1930s to 1940s

Personal details
- Born: 27 February 1918 Yining, Xinjiang Province, Republic of China
- Died: 3 December 1981 (aged 63) Ürümqi, Xinjiang Uyghur Autonomous Region, People's Republic of China
- Party: East Turkestan Revolutionary Party (1946–1947); Chinese Communist Party (joined 1949)
- Children: Shohrat Zakir (son)

Chinese name
- Chinese: 阿不都拉·扎克洛夫
Transcriptions
Standard Mandarin
- Hanyu Pinyin: Ābùdūlā Zhākèluòfū

Uyghur name
- Uyghur: ئابدۇللا زاكىروف
Transcriptions
- Latin Yëziqi: Abdulla Zakirof
- Siril Yëziqi: Абдулла Закиров

Abdulla Zakirov (Note: Chinese: 阿不都拉·扎克洛夫; pinyin: Ābùdūlā Zhākèluòfū; Uyghur: ئابدۇللا زاكىروف, romanized: Abdulla Zakirof) (27 February 1918 – 3 December 1981) was a Chinese politician who held high-ranking positions in his native Xinjiang. A Uyghur from the far-western city of Yining (Ghulja), he was a leader of the East Turkestan Revolutionary Party before joining the Chinese Communist Party after the incorporation of Xinjiang into the People's Republic of China (PRC) in 1949. His son Shohrat Zakir also became a prominent politician of the PRC.

== Biography ==
Born Abdulla Zakir on 27 February 1918 in Yining, Xinjiang Province, China, Abdulla spent most of his early life in the Soviet Union, where he received his higher education at a state university in Tashkent. Like many Soviet-educated Uyghur intellectuals at the time, he adopted the -ov suffix upon his return to Xinjiang to signify his higher education abroad. He founded the first Marxist–Leninist study group in the Northern Xinjiang district of Ili, and later joined the central executive committee of the East Turkestan Revolutionary Youth League. He then became a founding member and the secretary-general of the East Turkestan Revolutionary Party, which emerged from the Youth League and existed from 1946 to 1947.

On 30 December 1949, Abdulla and 14 other ethnic minority leaders (including several of his former ETRP colleagues) took an initiation oath at the local Chinese Communist Party (CCP) office in the provincial capital Dihua (present-day Ürümqi), following the incorporation of Xinjiang into the People's Republic of China (PRC) earlier that year. He then served in a number of prominent positions in Xinjiang, including Secretary-General of the Xinjiang Provincial People's Government, Vice-Chairman of the Xinjiang Uyghur Autonomous Regional Government, and member of the Standing Committee of the Xinjiang Uyghur Autonomous Regional Party Committee. He was also a delegate to the second National People's Congress. In 1951, during the Korean War, Abdulla accompanied Xi Zhongxun, the father of future CCP general secretary Xi Jinping, on a trip to Korea to meet and speak with cadres who had enlisted in the Chinese People's Volunteer Army. He then travelled with Liao Chengzhi to the frontlines to receive a briefing from the Korean People's Army (North Korean army).

Abdulla died in Ürümqi on 3 December 1981 at the age of 63. One of his sons, Shohrat Zakir, also became a Chinese statesman, most prominently serving as Chairman of the Xinjiang Uyghur Autonomous Regional Government from 2015 to 2021.
