= Latifa Al Maktoum (disambiguation) =

Latifa Al Maktoum may refer to:

- Three daughters of Sheikh Mohammed bin Rashid Al Maktoum, ruler of the emirate of Dubai:
  - Latifa bint Mohammed Al Maktoum (I) (born 1983), daughter of Delila Aloula, Vice President of the Dubai Culture & Arts Authority, married to Sheikh Faisal bin Saud bin Khalid Al Qasimi from the royal family of Ras Al Khaimah.
  - Latifa bint Mohammed Al Maktoum (II) (born 1985), daughter of Houria Ahmed Lamara, escaped from Dubai in late February 2018 and was forcibly returned.
  - Latifa bint Mohammed Al Maktoum (III) (born 1989), daughter of Sheikha Hind bint Maktoum bin Juma Al Maktoum, married in 2009 to Sheikh Mohammed bin Hamad bin Mohammed Al Sharqi, crown prince of Fujairah.
- Lateefa bint Maktoum Al Maktoum (born 1985), daughter of Maktoum bin Rashid Al Maktoum (elder brother of Mohammed bin Rashid Al Maktoum, died in 2006) and Alia Bint Khalifa Bin Saeed Al Maktoum, so cousin of the three above mentioned, and founder of Tashkeel Dubai.
- Latifa bint Ahmed Al Maktoum (Latifa bint Ahmed bin Juma Al Maktoum, born 1985), Olympic equestrian, daughter of Sheikha Hessa bint Rashid Al Maktoum (sister of Mohammed bin Rashid Al Maktoum)
- Latifa bint Rashid Al Maktoum (born 1996), daughter of Sheikha Fatima bint Rashid bin Saeed Al Maktoum (sister of Mohammed bin Rashid Al Maktoum)
- Latifa bint Hamdan bin Rashid Al Maktoum (born 1994), daughter of Hamdan bin Rashid Al Maktoum, owner of Zabeel Ladies Club

== See also ==
- Latifa (disambiguation)
- Al Maktoum, the ruling royal family of Dubai
