= Long Shujin =

Chinese politician

- 龙书金
- Born: November 21, 1910; Chichitang Township, Chaling County, Hunan, Qing China
- Died: April 16, 2003 (aged 92); Guangzhou, Guangdong, China
- Occupations: politician, military general
- Political party: Chinese Communist Party

Long Shujin (Chinese: 龙书金; November 21, 1910 – April 16, 2003) was a People's Liberation Army major general and a People's Republic of China politician. He was born in Hunan. He was Chairman of Xinjiang (1967–1972) and Secretary of Xinjiang Uygur Autonomous Regional Committee of the Chinese Communist Party.

== Biography ==
=== First Nationalist-Communist Civil War ===
Long Shujin was born on November 21, 1910, to a peasant family in Chichitang Township, Chaling County, Hunan. He enlisted in the Chinese Red Army in September 1930, joining Red Army XII; in December 1930, he joined the Communist Youth League of China. In February 1932, he joined the Chinese Communist Party. During the Second National Revolutionary War, he distinguished himself through diligence and valor, rapidly ascending from soldier to squad leader, platoon leader, and ultimately company commander of the Political Guard Company of the First Red Army Corps, participating in all anti-encirclement and anti-suppression campaigns in the Central Revolutionary Base (Chinese: 中央苏区) and the Long March. Upon the forces' arrival in Northern Shaanxi, he commanded them to engage in the Eastern and Western Campaigns. During the Eastern Campaign (Chinese: 东征战役), he commanded the assault unit that forcibly crossed the Yellow River, earning the designation of Hero of Battle from the First Red Army Corps for the successful crossing. In the Western Campaign (Chinese: 西征战役), the 4th Company under his command gained renown for its nocturnal engagements and close-quarters battle, earning the designation "Heroic Company of Night Tigers" from the legion.

=== Second Sino-Japanese War ===
During the Second Sino-Japanese War, Long Shujin held various positions, including company commander, deputy battalion commander, and battalion commander of the 685th Regiment of the 343rd Brigade of the 115th Division of the Eighth Route Army. He also served as deputy detachment commander of the Shandong Column in Lubei Province and commander of the 17th Regiment of the 6th Brigade of the 115th Division of the Eighth Route Army. He participated in the Battle of Pingxingguan and the Mengxian Ambush Battle and commanded the Battle of Dazongjia in Lingshixian County in February 1939, where he killed over 500 officers and soldiers, but sustained a lifelong disability due to a gunshot wound to his left hand. In February 1941, he assumed the role of deputy commander of the 6th Brigade of the 115th Division of the Eighth Route Army. He also assumed leadership of the 2nd Military Sub-District of Jilu Bian by September 1942, and in February 1944, the Bohai Military Region appointed him as deputy commander.

=== Second Nationalist-Communist Civil War ===
Following the onset of the Second Nationalist-Communist Civil War, he held the position of deputy commander of the Seventh Division of the Shandong Field Army and participated in the command of the Shanhaiguan Defense Battle, the inaugural engagement in the Northeast Theater. In this confrontation, he led over 10,000 troops from six regiments against an assault by more than 60,000 soldiers from two American-style mechanized armies of the Kuomintang, thereby securing critical time for the Chinese Communist Party to advance into the Northeast ahead of the enemy with a substantial influx of military and political personnel. Subsequently, he held the positions of deputy commander of the 7th Division of the Northeast Democratic Allied Army, commander of the 17th Division of the Northeast Field Army and secretary of the Party Committee, commander of the 128th Division of the 43rd Army of the 4th Field Army, deputy commander, and commander of the 43rd Army, among others. During the Summer Offensive of 1947, he led the 17th Division to obliterate a regiment of the Nationalist New 1st Army, led by Sun Liren, thereby dispelling the illusion of the New First Army's invincibility. During the Siping Campaign, he commanded the 17th Division in a relentless assault lasting 13 days, seizing Chen Mingren's primary fortified command post and capturing Chen Mingren's younger brother, Chen Mingxin, along with almost 2,000 subordinate commanders and soldiers. During the Battle of Jinzhou, he led the 128th Division of the 43rd Army systematically seized shrines, railway infrastructure, and well-fortified artillery positions held by the Kuomintang Army, resulting in the death and capture of 12,000 Kuomintang soldiers. Afterwards, he beacome the deputy commander of the 43rd Army, where he led his forces in successive battles such as the Battle of Tianjin, the Yangtze River Crossing campaign, the Hunan-Jiangxi campaign, the Guangdong campaign.

=== People's Republic of China ===
Following the establishment of the People's Republic of China, in April 1950, he led the 128th Division Headquarters and two augmented regiments to forcibly traverse the Qiongzhou Strait on a sailboat, becoming one of the initial military commanders of the People's Liberation Army (PLA) to land on Hainan Island, thereby establishing the foundation for the success of the Battle of Hainan Island. Subsequently, they elevated him to the position of commander of the 43rd Army, and then promoted him to commander of the Western Guangdong Military Region. In 1955, he assumed command of the Central and Southern Public Security Army (Chinese: 中南公安军), served as commander and party secretary of the Guangdong Military District, and became a member of the Standing Committee of the CCP Guangdong Provincial Committee. In 1959, he traveled to Beijing to attend the Beijing Higher Military Academy. In 1962, following his graduation, he assumed the roles of commander and party secretary of the Hunan Military District, as well as a member of the Standing Committee of the CCP Hunan Provincial Committee.

In 1968, he was appointed as the commander of the Xinjiang Military District, director of the Xinjiang Autonomous Region Revolution Committee, and first secretary of the CCP Xinjiang Uygur Autonomous Region Committee. In August 1968, hostilities erupted between the Chinese and Soviet forces at Tielieketi. Subsequently, the Chinese examined the reasons behind the earlier detection of the Soviet Union and the unpreparedness of the Tacheng Military Sub-District. After Lin Biao's death in 1971, Long Shujin, a former subordinate of Lin Biao, assumed primary responsibility for Tielieketi incident. He was subsequently examined during the Criticize Lin (Biao), Criticize Confucius Campaign and reassigned from Xinjiang.

In 1983, he retired. He died in April 16, 2003 at the age of 93.

Government offices
Preceded by Saifuddin Azizi	Chairman of Xinjiang; 1967–1972	Succeeded by Saifuddin Azizi
