= Anwar Hanbaba =

Chinese educator and politician (born 1917)

- 安尼瓦尔·汗巴巴; ئەنۋەر خانبابا; Anvar Xanbaba
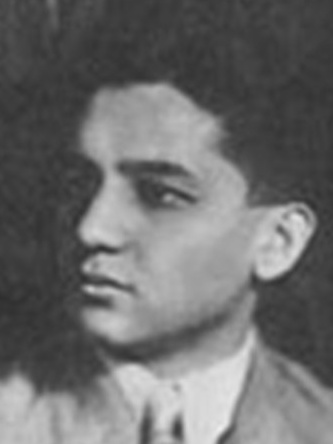
- Hanbaba as a university student, c. 1930s

Personal details
- Born: 1917 (age 108–109) Tashkent, Soviet Union
- Party: East Turkestan Revolutionary Party (1946–1947); Chinese Communist Party (joined 1949)

Chinese name
- Simplified Chinese: 安尼瓦尔·汗巴巴
- Traditional Chinese: 安尼瓦爾·汗巴巴
Transcriptions
Standard Mandarin
- Hanyu Pinyin: Ānníwǎ'ěr Hànbābā

Uyghur name
- Uyghur: ئەنۋەر خانبابا
Transcriptions
- Latin Yëziqi: Enwer Xanbaba
- SASM/GNC: Änwär Khanbaba
- Siril Yëziqi: Әнвәр Ханбаба

Uzbek name
- Uzbek: Anvar Xanbaba; Анвар Ханбаба

Anwar Hanbaba (Note: Chinese: 安尼瓦尔·汗巴巴; pinyin: Ānníwǎ'ěr Hànbābā; Uyghur: ئەنۋەر خانبابا, romanized: Enwer Xanbaba; Uzbek: Anvar Xanbaba, Cyrillic: Анвар Ханбаба) (born 1917) is a Chinese retired educator and politician who held high-ranking positions in the education departments of Xinjiang. He is an ethnic Uzbek who was born in the present-day Uzbek capital Tashkent, but his familial roots are in the Xinjiang capital Ürümqi. He was a prominent figure in the underground, Uyghur-led separatist movements of Northern Xinjiang during the 1940s, including the East Turkestan Revolutionary Party and the East Turkestan Revolutionary Youth League. However, shortly after the incorporation of Xinjiang into the People's Republic of China, he joined the Chinese Communist Party and became a career official in the regional education departments.

== Biography ==
Anwar Hanbaba was born to an Uzbek family in Tashkent, Soviet Union (present-day Uzbekistan), but his ancestral home is Dihua, Xinjiang Province (present-day Ürümqi, Xinjiang Uyghur Autonomous Region). He received his higher education in the Soviet capital Moscow and afterwards moved to Xinjiang, where he established an underground group of Turkic, mostly Uyghur, intellectuals. His first political office was heading a branch of the education department of the Second East Turkestan Republic (1944–1946). He then became a founding member of the East Turkestan Revolutionary Party (ETRP) in 1946 and served on its central executive committee as the minister of commerce until the party dissolved the next year. He was also a central committee member of the East Turkestan Revolutionary Youth League, the ETRP's youth wing which preceded the party.

On 30 December 1949, Hanbaba and 14 other ethnic minority leaders (including several of his former ETRP colleagues) took an initiation oath at the local Chinese Communist Party (CCP) office in Dihua and officially joined the party, following the incorporation of Xinjiang into the People's Republic of China (PRC) earlier that year. His subsequent posts as a PRC official included director of the education bureau of Ili Prefecture, director of the education department of Xinjiang Province, minister of the department of culture and education of the CCP Xinjiang Committee, director of the Xinjiang culture and education office, vice-president of Xinjiang University, chairman of the Xinjiang culture and education committee, and vice-chairman of the fourth and fifth Xinjiang delegations to the Chinese People's Political Consultative Conference (CPPCC). He was also a delegate to the second National People's Congress and a member of the sixth National Committee of the CPPCC.

== See also ==
- Uzbeks in China
