= Uzbeks in China =

Turkic ethnic group in Xinjiang, China

Total population
- 12,742 (2021)

Regions with significant populations
- Yining; Yarkant; Ürümqi; Tacheng

Languages
- Uzbek; Uyghur; Kazakh; Standard Chinese

Religion
- Islam

Related ethnic groups
- Uyghurs, Ili Turks, Äynus, Tor Tajiks, other Uzbeks

Chinese name
- Simplified Chinese: 乌孜别克族
- Traditional Chinese: 烏孜別克族
Transcriptions
Standard Mandarin
- Hanyu Pinyin: Wūzībiékèzú

Uzbek name
- Uzbek: O‘zbeklar

Uzbeks (Chinese: 乌孜别克族; pinyin: Wūzībiékèzú; Uzbek: O‘zbeklar) are one of the 56 officially recognized ethnic groups in China. The total population of China's Uzbeks in 2021 was 12,742, scattered in Yining, Tacheng, Ürümqi, and Yarkant in Xinjiang. Most of them live in urban areas and a few in rural areas. The Danangou Uzbek Township, located in Changji Hui Autonomous Prefecture, is the only township designated for Uzbeks in China. The Uzbeks in southern Xinjiang speak Uyghur because they have lived amongst the Uyghurs for a long time, and the Uzbeks in the pastoral areas of northern Xinjiang speak Kazakh.

== History ==
The history of Uzbeks in China dates back to the time of the Golden Horde, which existed in Central Asia and parts of China from the 13th to the 15th centuries. Many Uzbeks in China are descendants of merchants who traveled along the Silk Road, while others arrived in the 1750s following historical events in the region.

== Demographics ==
Uzbeks are one of the 56 officially recognized ethnic groups in China, with a population of approximately 10,000, making up less than 0.001% of the total population. They primarily reside in Xinjiang, particularly in cities such as Yining, Tacheng, Ürümqi, Yarkant, Yecheng, and Kashgar. Traditionally, Uzbeks in China have been urban dwellers, engaging in commerce and business. In the 1990s, less than 30% were farmers or herders; most were factory workers, technicians, and traders. Their literacy levels were among the highest in Xinjiang.

In 1953, more than 13,600 Uzbeks were recorded in China. By the 1964 census, this number had changed to around 7,700.

== Notable people ==
- Elihan Tore – President of the Second East Turkestan Republic
- Anwar Hanbaba – Chinese educator and politician (born 1917)
