= Seydulla Seypullayov =

Chinese politician and educator (1918–2002)

- 赛都拉·赛甫拉也夫; سەيدۇللا سەيپۇللايوۋ

Personal details
- Born: January 1918 Turpan County, Xinjiang Province, Republic of China
- Died: 4 September 2002 (aged 84) Ürümqi, Xinjiang Uyghur Autonomous Region, People's Republic of China
- Party: Xinjiang People's Anti-Imperialist Association (1940–1942); East Turkestan Revolutionary Party (1946–1947); Chinese Communist Party (joined 1950)

Chinese name
- Simplified Chinese: 赛都拉·赛甫拉也夫
- Traditional Chinese: 賽都拉·賽甫拉也夫
Transcriptions
Standard Mandarin
- Hanyu Pinyin: Sàidūlā Sàifǔlāyěfū

Alternative Chinese name
- Simplified Chinese: 赛都拉·赛甫拉约夫
- Traditional Chinese: 賽都拉·賽甫拉約夫
Transcriptions
Standard Mandarin
- Hanyu Pinyin: Sàidūlā Sàifǔlāyuēfū

Uyghur name
- Uyghur: سەيدۇللا سەيپۇللايوۋ
Transcriptions
- Latin Yëziqi: Seydulla Seypullayov
- Yengi Yeziⱪ: Seidulla Seipullayov
- Siril Yëziqi: Сейидулла Сейипуллайов

Seydulla Seypullayov (Note: Chinese: 赛都拉·赛甫拉也夫; pinyin: Sàidūlā Sàifǔlāyěfū; Uyghur: سەيدۇللا سەيپۇللايوۋ, romanized: Seydulla Seypullayov) (January 1918 – 4 September 2002) was a Chinese politician, educator, and writer who held high-ranking positions in the regional and local governments of Xinjiang. He was an ethnic Uyghur from Turpan and received his higher education in the Soviet Union.

== Early life and education ==
Seydulla Seypullayov was born in Turpan County, Xinjiang Province (now the Gaochang District of Turpan), in January 1918 to a Uyghur peasant family. He graduated from a Soviet state university in Tashkent, Soviet Uzbekistan, in August 1937 and returned to Xinjiang shortly thereafter. He worked as a teacher at the Xinjiang Provincial Normal School in Dihua (present-day Ürümqi), then at Ili Secondary School and Ili No. 6 Secondary School in Ghulja (present-day Yining). Among his students at the No. 6 school was Mirsultan Osmanov, who graduated in 1943 and would grow up to become a renowned Uyghur linguist and Turkologist.

In 1940, he joined the pro-Soviet Xinjiang People's Anti-Imperialist Association. In 1943, he returned to the Soviet Union to continue his post-secondary studies.

== Ili Rebellion ==
Seydulla returned to Xinjiang in 1944 and participated in the Ili Rebellion, which saw the establishment of the Soviet-backed, separatist East Turkestan Republic. He served in the provisional government's education department and was the director of the education bureaus of Ili Prefecture and Ghulja. He was also the secretary-general of the East Turkestan Revolutionary Party, vice-chairman of the East Turkestan Revolutionary Youth League, and acting head of Chapchal County. Seydulla later retroactively coined the name "Three Districts Revolution" to describe the rebellion, asserting it was a non-separatist revolution with the same objectives for Xinjiang as the Chinese Communist Party (CCP).

== Political career in the People's Republic of China ==
He joined the CCP without a preparatory period (i.e. ideological training) in March 1950 after the proclamation of the People's Republic of China (PRC), and immediately took up several positions, including leader of the Southern Xinjiang Propaganda Department, member of the Southern Xinjiang Military and Political Committee, deputy director of the Southern Xinjiang Mass Work Department, deputy secretary of the Ili Prefectural Party Committee, member of the Standing Committee of the Kashgar Prefectural Party Committee, commissioner of the Kashgar Administrative Office, and director of the United Front Work Department.

In February 1951, Seydulla hosted a "Symposium of Fifty-One Intellectuals" in Ili to discuss the establishment of a subnational Uyghur federative republic within the PRC, modelled after the Soviet Union. The following month, Seydulla and his ethnic Russian colleague Fotiy Leskin were severely reprimanded by General Wang Zhen in Ürümqi.

From August 1954, he served as a representative of the first People's Congress of the Xinjiang UAR, a member of the Standing Committee of the Xinjiang UAR Party Committee, deputy minister of the Xinjiang UAR Organisation Department, director of the Xinjiang UAR Personnel Department, and chief prosecutor of the Xinjiang UAR People's Procuratorate. In July 1956, he was appointed secretary of the Secretariat of the Xinjiang UAR Party Committee. In 1957, he was appointed deputy commissioner of the Hami Administrative Office.

After August 1979, he served as a vice chairman of the Xinjiang delegation to the Chinese People's Political Consultative Conference, vice chairman and deputy secretary of the party group of the Standing Committee of the fifth and sixth People's Congresses of the Xinjiang UAR. Sometime before that, he was also elected as a representative of the third Party Congress.

On 4 September 2002, Seydulla died of illness in Ürümqi at the age of 84.
