= Latif =

Al-Latif (Al-Laṭīf لطيف, also anglicized as Al-Lateef) is one of the names of God (Allah, one God) in Islam, meaning "gentle, kind, subtle, beautifully discreet."

Latif can also be a masculine given name, as short form of Abdul Latif, meaning "servant of the Gentle". Its feminine form is Latifa. "Al-Latif" also means "The Subtle".

== Notable persons ==
Given name

- Latif (singer/songwriter), full name Corey Latif Williams, American rhythm and blues singer
- Latif (video game player), full name Abdullatif Alhmili (born 1990), Saudi-American fighting games player
- Latif Afridi (1943–2023), Pakistani lawyer
- Shah Abdul Latif (1689/90-1752), Sindhi poet
- Latif Halmat (born 1947), or Letîf Helmet, Kurdish-Iraqi poet
- Latif Kapadia (1934–2002), Pakistani stage and television actor
- Latif Karimov (1906–1991), Azerbaijani carpet designer
- Latif Khosa (born 1946), politician, Governor of Punjab
- Latif Nangarhari (born 1981), Afghan singer
- Latif Ouedraogo (born 2007), Burkinabe footballer
- Latif Rahman, Singaporean football
- Latif Rashid (born 1944), Iraqi politician and minister
- Latif Safarov (1920–1963), Azerbaijani actor and movie director.
- Latif Salifu (born 1990), Ghanaian football player
- Latif Yahia (born 1964), Iraqi author and former body double

Family name

- Aamir Latif, a former governor in Afghanistan
- Ahmed Latif (born 1950), Afghan film director
- Amar Latif (born 1974), a blind British entrepreneur, actor, director
- Idris Hasan Latif (1923–2018), former Chief of Air Staff of the Indian Air Force
- Khalid Latif (cricketer) (born 1985), Pakistani cricketer
- Khalid Latif (imam) (born 1982), Chaplain (Imam) for the Islamic Center at New York University
- Mohamed Latif (1909–1990), Egyptian football player
- Mojib Latif (born 1954), German-Pakistani meteorologist and oceanographer
- Muhammed Latif, Iraqi major general and politician
- Muid Latif (1979–2020), Malaysian web designer and digital artist
- Naved Latif (born 1976), a Pakistani cricketer
- Nazir Latif (1927–2011), Pakistan Air Force officer
- Rashid Latif (born 1968), Pakistani cricket player
- Rizwan Latif (born 1973), Pakistani-UAE cricket player
- Shaheed Latif (1913–1967), Hindi film director, writer and producer.
- Shazad Latif (born 1988), a British television actor

== See also ==
- Latifur Rahman (disambiguation)
- Lateef (disambiguation)
- Lutfi
- Lutfullah
