= Lutfi Lepaja =

Kosovar writer

- Born: 20 May 1945 (age 81); Bajcina (near Podujevo), DFR Yugoslavia
- Occupations: novelist, poet, critic, teacher

Lutfi Lepaja (born 20 May 1945 in Bajçina, a village near Podujevo, DFR Yugoslavia.) is a Kosovar writer who writes in Albanian. Lepaja is author of more than ten works (novels, essays, poetry, plays, etc.).

== Biography ==
Lutfi Lepaja finished elementary and secondary school in Stantërg and Mitrovica. For his literary formation responds with full sense the word "autodidact". He deals with five artistic literary genres: novel, story, essay, poetry, and journalism. He is typical author "discovered" by anonymous literary competitions and on almost all these genres was awarded more than once. Radio Pristina realised three of his plays, also his monodrama Ruleti kosovar was put om stage on many local theaters, and the same was also staged at the International Monodrama Festival in Korçë (Albania), in 2010. He has many unpublished works ready there waiting for publishing. He also collaborates with web-based newspaper "JAVA" and publishes his works mainly there.

== Published works ==
- Parimi i Pritjes
- Përqafim i padukshëm
- Kona
- Tepër Serioz
- Gëte ka të drejtë
- Granias Lament
- Shkollë për specialistë
- Ngutja në jetë
- Valëza e Lumit
- Zero zero
- Zinxhiri i këputur
- Panairi i ideve
- Kopili
- Ruleti kosovar
