= Latifa School for Girls =

School for girls in Dubai, United Arab Emirates

Location
- Nad Al Sheba; Dubai; United Arab Emirates
- Coordinates: 25.1424°N 55.3272°E

Information
- Religious affiliation: Islam
- Established: 1982
- Headmistress: Mrs. Debra Forsyth
- Grades: Nursery - Grade 13
- Gender: Girls
- Age range: 3 - 18
- Average class size: 45 pupils
- Education system: GCSE/GCE
- Hours in school day: Primary = 7:30 am - 2:00 pm Secondary = 7:35 am - 3:00 pm
- Colours: Red, Green, Black and White
- Slogan: Learning For Life
- Nickname: LSG
- School fees: non-profit
- Website: www.lsg.sch.ae/lsg/index.php/en/

Latifa School for Girls was founded in 1982 by Sheikh Maktoum. It was headed by Tim Charlton, who also founded Dubai College in 1978.

LSFG had approximately 300 students.
