= Shahid Lateef =

Pakistani military officer

Air Marshal Shahid Lateef HI(M), SI(M), SBt
- Born: Sahiwal
- Military career
- Allegiance: Pakistan
- Branch: Pakistan Air Force
- Service years: 1974–2009
- Rank: Air Marshal
- Commands: Vice-Chief of Air Staff (VCAS); DCAS (Aerial Operations); Project-Director, F-17 Thunder program Military advisor to the UAE Air Force
- Conflicts: Indo-Pakistani war of 1971; Soviet–Afghan War; 2001 India Pakistan standoff War in North-West Pakistan
- Awards: Hilal-e-Imtiaz (Military) Sitara-e-Imtiaz (Military) Sitara-e-Basalat

Shahid Lateef (Urdu: شاہد لطیف; HI(M), SI(M), SBt, is a retired Pakistan Air Force three-star air marshal, geostrategist and military strategist, and political commentator. Lateef is from Pakistan city of Sahiwal.

A veteran fighter pilot, Lateef was commissioned in April, 1974 in the Pakistan Air Force (PAF), serving in influential staff appointments during his air force career. He completed an academic degree with top honours, and was awarded a Sword of Honour from the PAF Academy in Risalpur. Lateef has performed duties as a fighter pilot in various squadrons of the PAF and was among the founders of the F-16 induction programme in the PAF.

On March 24, 2017, Lateef accused Nawaz Sharif of a "blasphemous speech" to Karachi's Hindu community.

== Biography ==
Lateef hailed from Sahiwal in Punjab,having a humble background with his late father being a stenographer clerk in the government. Years before Lateef was to be commissioned as an officer, he was an exceptional student at PAF Public School, Lower Topa. One of Latif's closest associates was Group Captain (R) Shamsher Ali (later commissioned in the Air Defence branch of PAF and served as DG NAB,Lahore) who had numerous anecdotal encounters with Lateef throughout his life.Both friends were extraordinarily gifted in the domain of athletic activities.In 1970, Lateef was inducted in the PAF Academy in Risalpur, Khyber-Pakhtunkhwa, and participated in the war with India in 1971. Graduated with BA degree in 1974, he stood at the top of his class in his alma mater and conferred with Sword of Honour. He gained commission in 1974 in General Duties Pilot (GDP) branch.

=== Air Force career ===
Due to his excellent performance on the Chinese F-6 aircraft, he moved on to the French Mirage at an early stage of his career.

He was chosen in the group of the first six PAF Pilots to undergo F-16 conversion in the United States. Lateef was the first pilot to ferry the F-16 from USA to Pakistan in 1982, and formed part of the pioneer team for training pilots in Pakistan on the F-16 weapon system. With these same pilots he flew numerous combat missions in defence of Pakistan during the Afghan war in the 1980s. He was sent to the United Arab Emirates where he was assigned the command of a Mirage squadron. He was then chosen to command a fighter squadron, fighter wing and a fighter base in the PAF.

He has had numerous key staff appointments at the Air Headquarters including the JF-17 Project.

He was to actively encouraged to the rank of Air vice Marshal, and was given the JF-17 Project; a programme that was not able to start due to difficulties, forcing the PAF to continue to operate obsolete equipment. Through his efforts, the JF-17 project finally came to life. He served the Air Force of Pakistan from September, 1971 to April, 2006. In recognition of his services he was awarded the Hilal-e-Imtiaz (Military), Sitara-e-Imtiaz (Military) and Sitara-i-Basalat.

== Defense analyst ==
After retirement from the PAF, Lateef started a new career as a defense analyst and appeared on a number of talk shows and gave his expert analysis on geopolitical affairs. Lateef has given bold opinions against several political developments and personalities in the country. However, later into his life, Lateef reportedly distanced himself from the public eye, simultaneously cutting off relations with some of his closest confidants, including Group Captain (R) Shamsher. This alarming change in behaviour has suspected to stem from a throat disease Lateef suffers from which makes it unpleasant for him to maintain social interaction.

== Awards and decorations ==
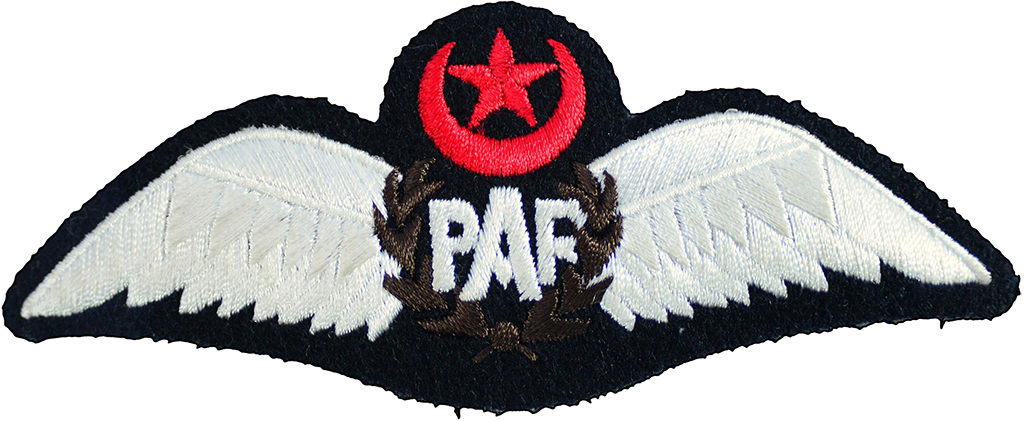

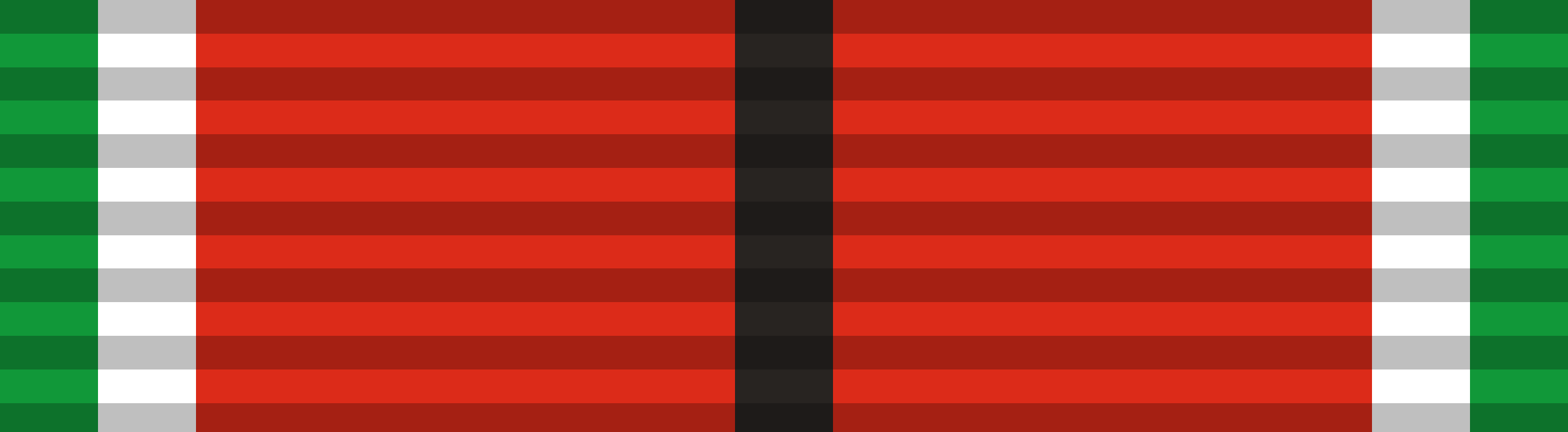

PAF GD(P) Badge RED (More than 3000 Flying Hours)
	Hilal-e-Imtiaz (Military) (Crescent of Excellence)		
Hilal-e-Imtiaz (Military) (Crescent of Excellence)	Sitara-e-Imtiaz (Military) (Star of Excellence)	Sitara-e-Basalat (Star of Good Conduct)	Tamgha-e-Jang 1971 War (War Medal 1971)
Tamgha-e-Baqa (Nuclear Test Medal) 1998	Tamgha-e-Istaqlal Pakistan (Escalation with India Medal) 2002	10 Years Service Medal	20 Years Service Medal
30 Years Service Medal	35 Years Service Medal	Tamgha-e-Sad Saala Jashan-e- Wiladat-e-Quaid-e-Azam (100th Birth Anniversary of Muhammad Ali Jinnah) 1976	Hijri Tamgha (Hijri Medal) 1979
Jamhuriat Tamgha (Democracy Medal) 1988	Qarardad-e-Pakistan Tamgha (Resolution Day Golden Jubilee Medal) 1990	Tamgha-e-Salgirah Pakistan (Independence Day Golden Jubilee Medal) 1997	Military Unity Star (UAE)

=== Foreign Decorations ===
Foreign Awards
UAE	Military Unity Star (1986)

== See also ==
- Sohail Aman
- Pakistan Air Force
