= East Turkestan People's Revolutionary Party =

Uyghur separatist group (1968–1969)

- Founded: 1968 or earlier
- Dissolved: 1969
- Headquarters: Kazakh SSR, Soviet Union
- Active regions: Xinjiang, China
- Ideology: Communism; Marxism–Leninism; East Turkestan independence
- Size: 60,000 (self-claimed, unverified)

Uyghur name
- Uyghur: شەرقىي تۈركىستان خەلق ئىنقىلاۋى پارتىيىسى
Transcriptions
- Latin Yëziqi: Sherqiy Türkistan Xelq Inqilawi Partiyisi
- Yengi Yeziⱪ: Xərⱪiy Türkistan Helq Inⱪilawi Partiyisi
- Siril Yëziqi: Шәрқий Түркистан Хәлқ Инқилави Партийиси

Russian name
- Russian: Народно-революционная партия Восточного Туркестана
- Romanization: Narodno-revolyutsionnaya partiya Vostochnogo Turkestana

Chinese name
- Simplified Chinese: 东突厥斯坦人民革命党
- Traditional Chinese: 東突厥斯坦人民革命黨
Transcriptions
Standard Mandarin
- Hanyu Pinyin: Dōng Tūjuésītǎn Rénmín Gémìng Dǎng

People's Revolutionary Party
- Simplified Chinese: 人民革命党
- Traditional Chinese: 人民革命黨
Transcriptions
Standard Mandarin
- Hanyu Pinyin: Rénmín Gémìng Dǎng

The East Turkestan People's Revolutionary Party (ETPRP) (Note: Uyghur: شەرقىي تۈركىستان خەلق ئىنقىلاۋى پارتىيىسى, romanized: Sherqiy Türkistan Xelq Inqilawi Partiyisi; Russian: Народно-революционная партия Восточного Туркестана, romanized: Narodno-revolyutsionnaya partiya Vostochnogo Turkestana; Chinese: 东突厥斯坦人民革命党; pinyin: Dōng Tūjuésītǎn Rénmín Gémìng Dǎng) was a communist militant organization advocating East Turkestan independence (i.e. Xinjiang separatism). It was founded as the Uyghurstan People's Party amid the height of the Sino-Soviet split, in either 1967 or 1968. It was based in Soviet Kazakhstan and received covert support from the Soviet government. The group disappeared following the arrest or exile of most of its leaders in 1969 and a decline in Soviet support owing to a rekindling of Sino-Soviet relations.

== History ==
According to its former members, the Uyghurstan People's Party was founded in or a few years before 1967 or 1968. Chinese historian Zhang Yuxi suggests that the group may have been established clandestinely as early as 1963. The group changed its name to the East Turkestan People's Revolutionary Party (ETPRP) to echo the legacy of the earlier East Turkestan Revolutionary Party (1946–1947) and to appeal to Turkic populations aside from the Uyghurs, particularly the Kazakhs and Kyrgyz in China.

Former ETPRP members claimed the group reached a peak of 60,000 fighters and 178 underground branches in 1969, which would have made the ETPRP the largest separatist group in Xinjiang since the region's 1949 takeover by the People's Republic of China. However, these figures have never been verified by a third party. The group initially set up clandestine branches in Kashgar and Ürümqi, the cultural and political capitals of Xinjiang, but its leadership was based in Soviet Kazakhstan.

After a failed insurrection in 1969, the ETPRP gradually weakened due to the arrest and exile of most of its members. The ETPRP blamed the Soviets for their "lack of commitment" to supporting the separatists. Soviet support decreased as Sino-Soviet relations began warming up again that year.
