= Lutfi (court official) =

Lutfi was a court official who lived in the Ottoman Empire during the 16th century. He was well respected and an influential man.

== Background ==
There is very little information on Lutfi therefore the dates of his birth and death are unknown; nothing beyond his services of the court are known either. In the document that Giancarlo Casele deems to be written by Lutfi himself, Lutfi calls himself “His Majesty’s Servant Lutfi.”[Lutfi Bendeleri]. He acted as "courier, and as bearer on [another] occasion of a message from the Ottoman sultan to the Acehnese."^{1} From the writing of his report, we can conclude that he had formal education. The date that we do know is that one that was fixed in Lutfi's letter. His letter was "written in the middle of the month of Cemazi the Second in the year three and seventy and nine hundred^{2}" which roughly translates to August 1565-6. In this time period, the Ottoman Empire and the Portuguese were having disputes over the Indian Ocean in terms of trade.

== Career ==
From Lutfi’s title, it is already known that he was a servant of the court. However, his job descriptions branches out from there; "Lutfi is described as an experienced seaman, as a member of the Ottoman sultan's special corps of sea captains [muteferrika re’isleri], and as the official escort of an Acehnese embassy to Istanbul^{3}.” He was very popular among the Acehnese. "Lutfi was apparently so highly estemmed among the Acehnese that they requested he be sent back from Istanbul to Sumatra at his earliest convenience^{4}." Lutfi's career is linked to Sokollu Mehmed Pasha. It was Sokollu who sent Lutfi to "investigate conditions in the region first-hand, and explore the possibility of expanding operations^{5}." He was responsible for keeping Ottoman interests in the Indian Ocean as well as spreading the Islamic faith. He travelled to different places, namely Aceh and Sumatra.

Lutfi's mission for going to Aceh was to observe and report about the routes and had to "return to Istanbul with a judgement about whether or not it was feasible to send a shipment of military supplies^{6}" that was asked for by the Acehnese.

== Significance ==
The arrival of Lutfi caused much excitement to the places he went. "In the light of all this diplomatic activity, it can hardly be a coincidence that, in the years immediately following Lutfi's visit to Sumatra, Muslim political leaders clear across the Indian Ocean began to organize resistance to Portuguese rule in an impressive and unprecedented display of pan-Islamic unity.^{7}" Lutfi was also a promoter of the Islamic faith. At a port in Aceh, Lutfi got into an argument with a Portuguese ship crew and "demanded the crew be forced to convert to Islam or be put to the sword for their insolence, and the Achnese sultan agreed^{8}."

Lutfi's letter, itself, has been a valuable document to historians "in any language about the political history of the Indian Ocean in this period^{9}."

== Extractions from Lutfi's Writing ==
In the year nine hundred and seventy two. His Majesty's Servant Lutfi came here, and on his return journey he loaded sixteen kanters of pepper, silk, cinnamon, cloves, camphor, hisalbend, and other products from the "Lands below the Winds" onto a large famous ship known as the "Samadi".

In fact, when rulers of Ceylon and Calicut received news that your Majesty's servant Lutfi had arrived here, they sent ambassadors to us who proclaimed: "We are servants of his Imerpial Majesty..." and took an oath swearing that if your Imperial Majesty's propitious fleet were tro journey to these lands, they themselves would come to the faith and profess the religion of Isman, and that likewise all of their infidel subjects would forsake false belief for the straight path of the one true religion.
