= Asgat Iskhakov =

Chinese Tatar politician (1921–1976)

- 艾斯海提·伊斯哈科夫; ئەسئەت ئىسھاقوف; Әсгать Исхаков
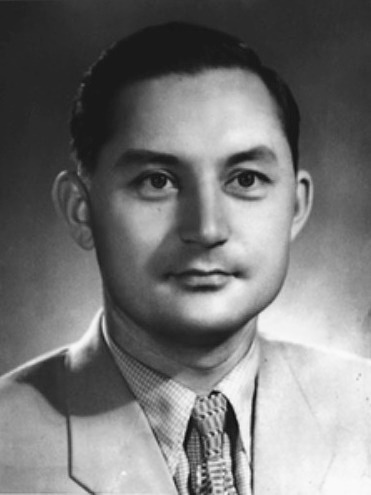

Vice Chairman of the Xinjiang Uyghur Autonomous Region
- In office August 1956 – September 1968

Personal details
- Born: Asgat Timergali uli Iskhakov; 1 December 1921 Emin County, Xinjiang Province, Republic of China
- Died: 7 January 1976 (aged 54) Xinjiang Uyghur Autonomous Region, People's Republic of China
- Party: East Turkestan Revolutionary Party (1946–1947); Xinjiang League (1947–1949); Chinese Communist Party (from 1950)
- Relations: Margub Iskhakov (brother)

Chinese name
- Chinese: 艾斯海提·伊斯哈科夫
Transcriptions
Standard Mandarin
- Hanyu Pinyin: Àisīhǎití Yīsīhākēfū

Uyghur name
- Uyghur: ئەسئەت ئىسھاقوف
Transcriptions
- Latin Yëziqi: Es'et Ishaqof

Tatar name
- Tatar: Әсгать Тимергали улы Исхаков; Äsğät Timergali ulı İsxaqov

Asgat Timergali uli Iskhakov (Note: Chinese: 艾斯海提·伊斯哈科夫; pinyin: Àisīhǎití Yīsīhākēfū; Uyghur: ئەسئەت ئىسھاقوف, romanized: Es'et Ishaqof; Tatar: Әсгать Тимергали улы Исхаков, romanized: Äsğät Timergali ulı İsxaqov) (1 December 1921 – 7 January 1976) was a Chinese Tatar politician who occupied several political offices in his native Xinjiang. He was one of several former high-ranking officials of the East Turkestan Republic to join the Chinese Communist Party after the 1949 incorporation of Xinjiang into the People's Republic of China. In 1954, he was elected to the 1st National People's Congress. He served as vice-chairman of the Xinjiang Uyghur Autonomous Region from August 1956 to September 1968.
