= Lutfi Kabirova =

Lutfi Kabirova Лутфӣ Кабирова
- Born: 7 October 1932; Samarkand, Uzbek SSR, Soviet Union
- Died: 19 May 2013 (aged 80) Dushanbe, Tajikistan
- Genres: Classical
- Occupations: Opera singer; actress
- Instrument: Singing

Lutfi Rahimjonovna Kabirova (Note: Tajik: Лутфӣ Раҳимҷоновна Кабирова, romanized: Lutfī Raqimjonovna Kabirova; Russian: Лютфия Рашиджановна Кабирова, romanized: Lyutfiya Rashidzhanovna Kabirova) (October 7, 1932 – May 19, 2013) was a Soviet and Tajikistani opera singer.

== Biography ==
Kabirova was born into a working-class family in Samarkand, and graduated from the Dushanbe School of Music in 1949, after which she entered the voice department of the Moscow Conservatory. A soprano, she graduated from that institution in 1954 and at once joined the roster of the Ayni Theater of Opera and Ballet. She sang roles in operas by numerous Tajikistani composers, including Niso in Bakhtiar and Niso by Sergey Balasanian (1954), Gulru in Pulod and Gulru by Sharofiddin Saifiddinov (1957), Surma in The Famous Son-in-Law by Samuil Urbakh (1961), and Malohat in Return by Yakhiel Sabzanov (1967). Other roles in her repertory included Tatiana in Eugene Onegin, Lisa in The Queen of Spades, Desdemona in Otello, Bess in Porgy and Bess, the title roles in Aida and Madama Butterfly, Katerina in The Taming of the Shrew by Vissarion Shebalin, and Natasha in Quiet Flows the Don by Ivan Dzerzhinsky. She also performed in operetta, notably in such works as Die Csárdásfürstin and Countess Maritza by Emmerich Kálmán; in concert she mingled the work of Tajikistani and foreign composers. Kabirova traveled both within the Soviet Union and abroad during her career. She was named a People's Artist of the USSR for her work in 1977, and received such other awards as the Order of the Red Banner of Labour and the Honour of the Presidium of the Supreme Soviet of the Tajik SSR.
