= Latifabad, Lorestan =

Latifabad لطيف آباد
- Village
- Location within Iran
- Coordinates: 33°35′10″N 49°15′18″E
- Country: Iran
- Province: Lorestan
- County: Dorud
- Bakhsh: Central
- Rural District: Zhan

Population (2006)
  - Total: 80
- Time zone: UTC+3:30 (IRST)
  - Summer (DST): UTC+4:30 (IRDT)

Latifabad (Persian: لطيف آباد, also Romanized as Laṭīfābād) is a village in Zhan Rural District, in the Central District of Dorud County, Lorestan Province, Iran. At the 2006 census, its population was 80, in 23 families.
