= Latif, Lorestan =

Latif لطيف
- Village
- Location within Iran
- Coordinates: 33°30′00″N 47°07′00″E
- Country: Iran
- Province: Lorestan
- County: Kuhdasht
- Bakhsh: Tarhan
- Rural District: Tarhan-e Gharbi

Population (2006)
  - Total: 356
- Time zone: UTC+3:30 (IRST)
  - Summer (DST): UTC+4:30 (IRDT)

Latif (Persian: لطيف, also Romanized as Laţīf) is a village in Tarhan-e Gharbi Rural District, Tarhan District, Kuhdasht County, Lorestan Province, Iran. At the 2006 census, its population was 356, in 78 families.
