= Nijat (given name) =

Nijat is an Azerbaijani male given name that may refer to

- Nijat Abasov (born 1995), Azerbaijani chess player
- Nidjat Mamedov (born 1985), Azerbaijani chess player
- Nijat Rahimov (born 1993), Azerbaijani-Kazakhstani weightlifter
- Nijat Shikhalizade (born 1988), Azerbaijani judoka
