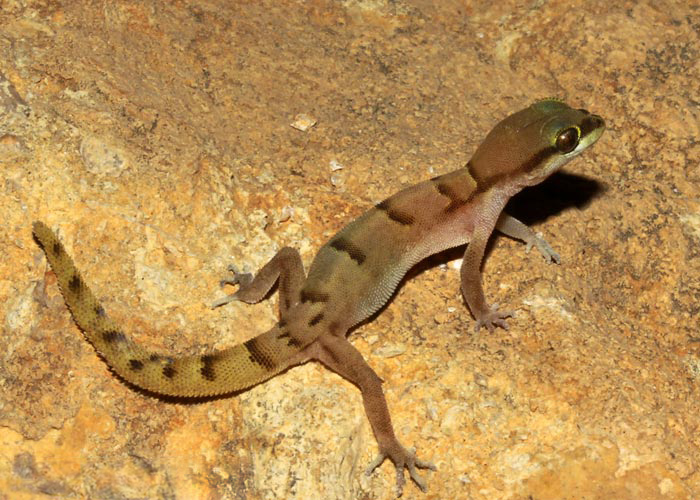

Conservation status
- Least Concern (IUCN 3.1)

Scientific classification
- Kingdom: Animalia
- Phylum: Chordata
- Class: Reptilia
- Order: Squamata
- Suborder: Gekkota
- Family: Gekkonidae
- Genus: Microgecko
- Species: M. latifi

Binomial name
- Microgecko latifi (Leviton & S.C. Anderson, 1972)

Synonyms
- Tropiocolotes latifi Leviton & S.C. Anderson, 1972; Tropiocolotes (Microgecko) latifi — Golubev, 1984; Microgecko latifi — Kluge, 1993; Microgecko latifi — Bauer et al., 2013

= Latifi's dwarf gecko =

Species of reptiles, genus of Microgecko

Latifi's dwarf gecko (Microgecko latifi), also known commonly as the Zagros tiny gecko, is a species of lizard in the family Gekkonidae. The species is endemic to Iran.

== Etymology ==
The specific name, latifi, is in honor of Iranian herpetologist Mahmoud Latifi (1929–2005).

== Geographic range ==
M. latifi is found in the Zagros Mountains in Iran in the provinces of Fars, Kerman, and Markazi.

== Habitat ==
The preferred natural habitat of M. latifi is shrubland near fresh water.

== Reproduction ==
M. latifi is oviparous.
