= Ürümqi Revolutionary Martyrs Cemetery =

Cemetery and memorial in Xinjiang, China

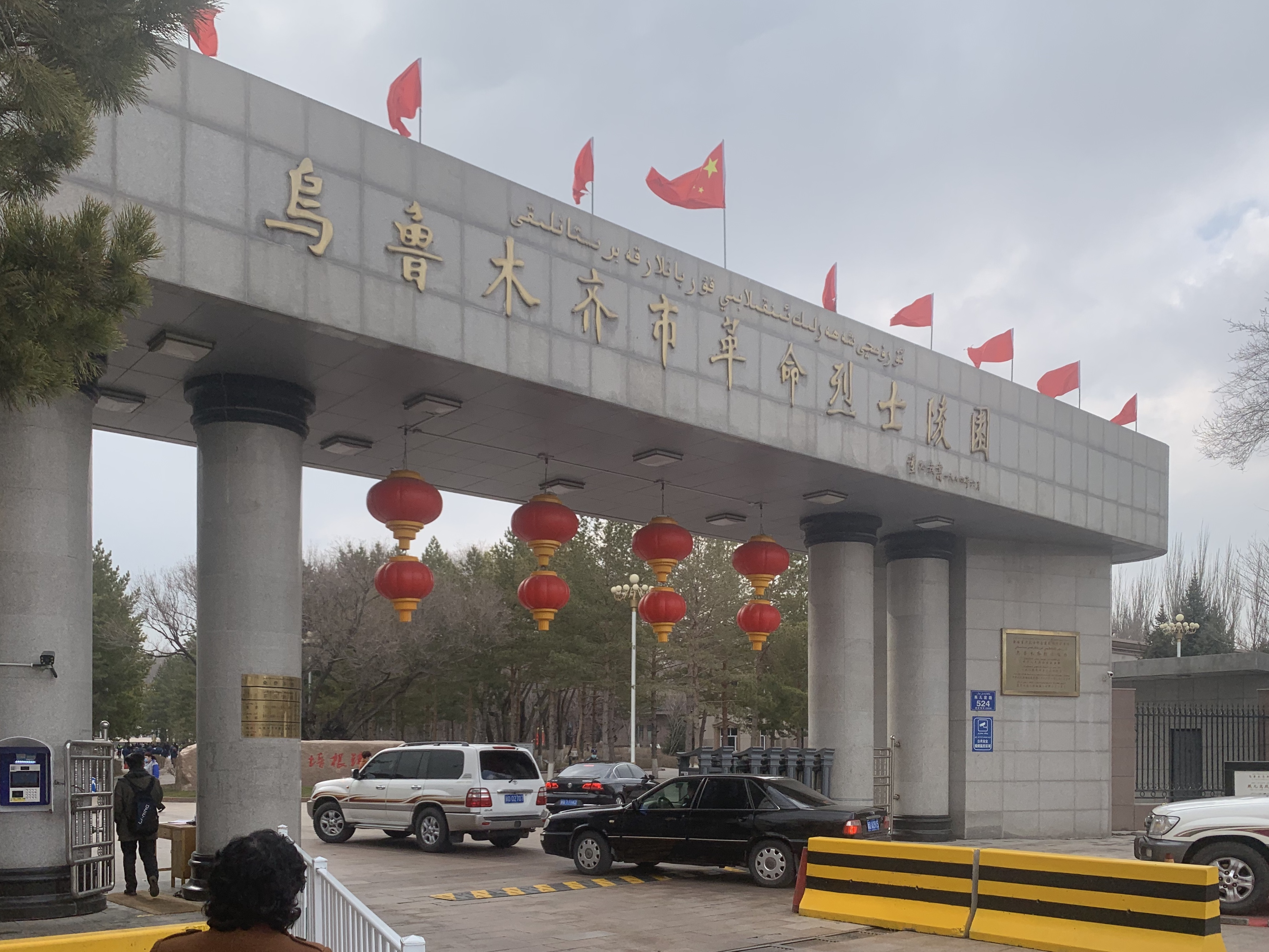
- Main gate of the cemetery
- Interactive map of Ürümqi Revolutionary Martyrs Cemetery

Details
- Established: 25 July 1956
- Location: 524 Yan'erwu Road, Tianshan, Ürümqi
- Country: China
- Coordinates: 43°43′53″N 87°35′37″E
- Size: 54 ha (130 acres)

The Ürümqi Revolutionary Martyrs Cemetery (Uyghur: ئۈرۈمچى شەھەرلىك ئىنقىلابىي قۇربانلار قەبرىستانلىقى, Chinese: 乌鲁木齐市革命烈士陵园) is a commemorative garden in Tianshan District, Urumqi City in Xinjiang, China. It buries the bodies of former communist veterans such as Chen Tanqiu, Mao Zemin, Lin Jilu, and Burhan Shahidi, as well as soldiers fallen in Ili Rebellion, Sino-Indian and Sino-Vietnamese War. The cemetery has been designated as a key historical site by the government.

== Background ==
Sheng Shicai, the warlord prominent in Xinjiang, arrested dozens of Chinese Communist Party members stationed in Xinjiang in February 1943, after he turned against Soviet Union as Moscow stopped aiding China. In September, Chen Tanqiu, Mao Zemin, Lin Jilu, Du Zhongyuan and others were secretly executed in Ürümqi, while the remaining were released in June 1946.

== History ==
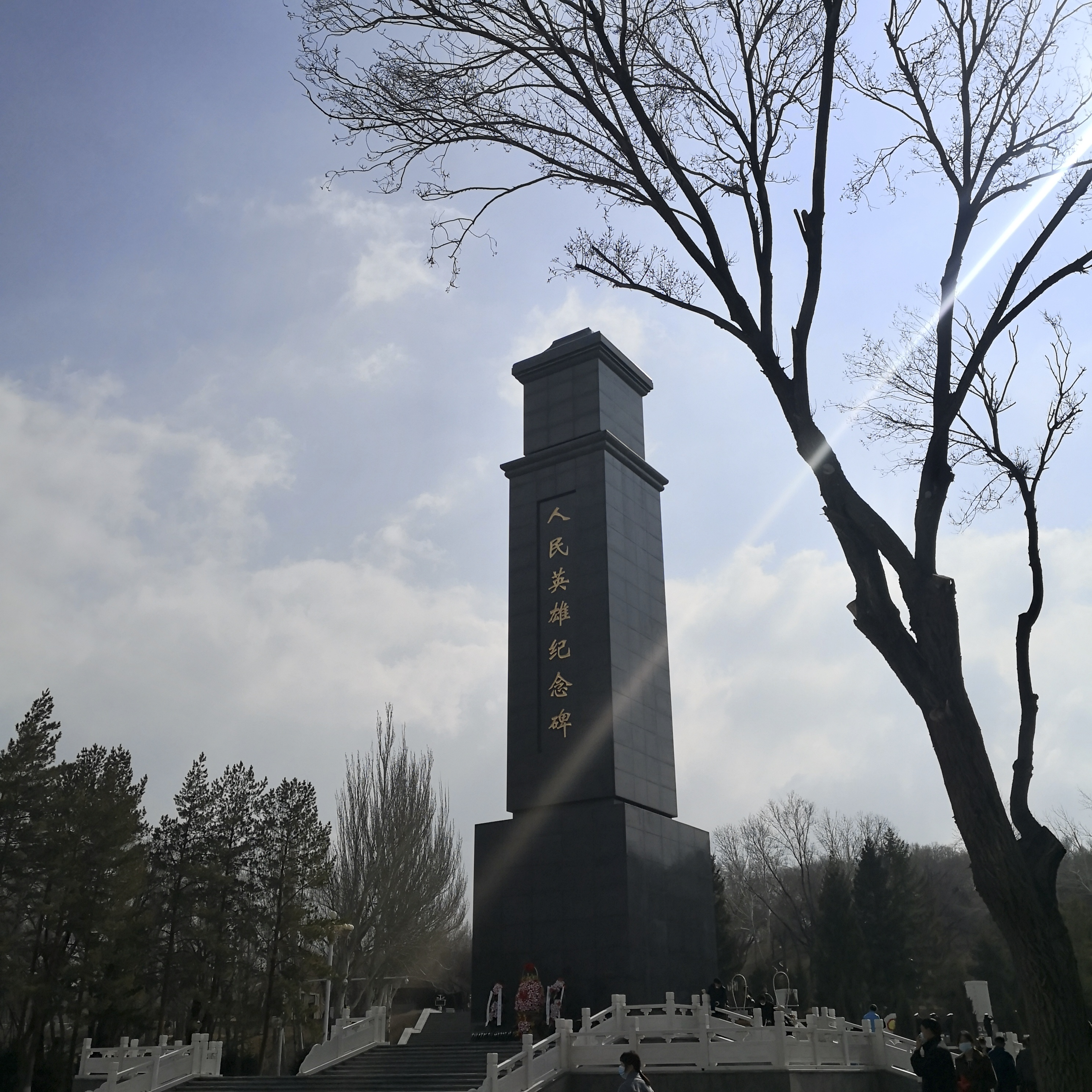
Monument of he People's Heroes

Five years after Xinjiang was taken over by the communists, in 1954, the local government and party branch agreed to construct a revolutionary martyrs cemetery, which formally began in June 1956. After the remains of the veterans were relocated to and interred in July, the cemetery officially opened on 25 July. It was visited by several communist leaders including Zhu De, Chen Yi, He Long, Deng Yingchao, Burhan Shahidi, Wang Enmao, Xi Zhongxun, Jiang Zemin, and Yu Zhengsheng. In 1965, a pavilion and a resting room and other new facilities were built in the cemetery and trees were planted to commemorate the tenth anniversary of the takeover. The tomb is now adorned with thousands of trees, including peach, pine, and cypress trees, among others.

During the Cultural Revolution, the gravestones of Qiao Guozhen and Wu Maolin were destroyed; they were repaired in 1980. In 1974, Dong Biwu, then vice president, visited the cemetery and inscribed the name. The cemetery was also renovated a year later, with further expansions in 1980 and 2010s with new statutes, halls, and exhibition rooms. The size of the cemetery is over 54 ha.

== Status ==
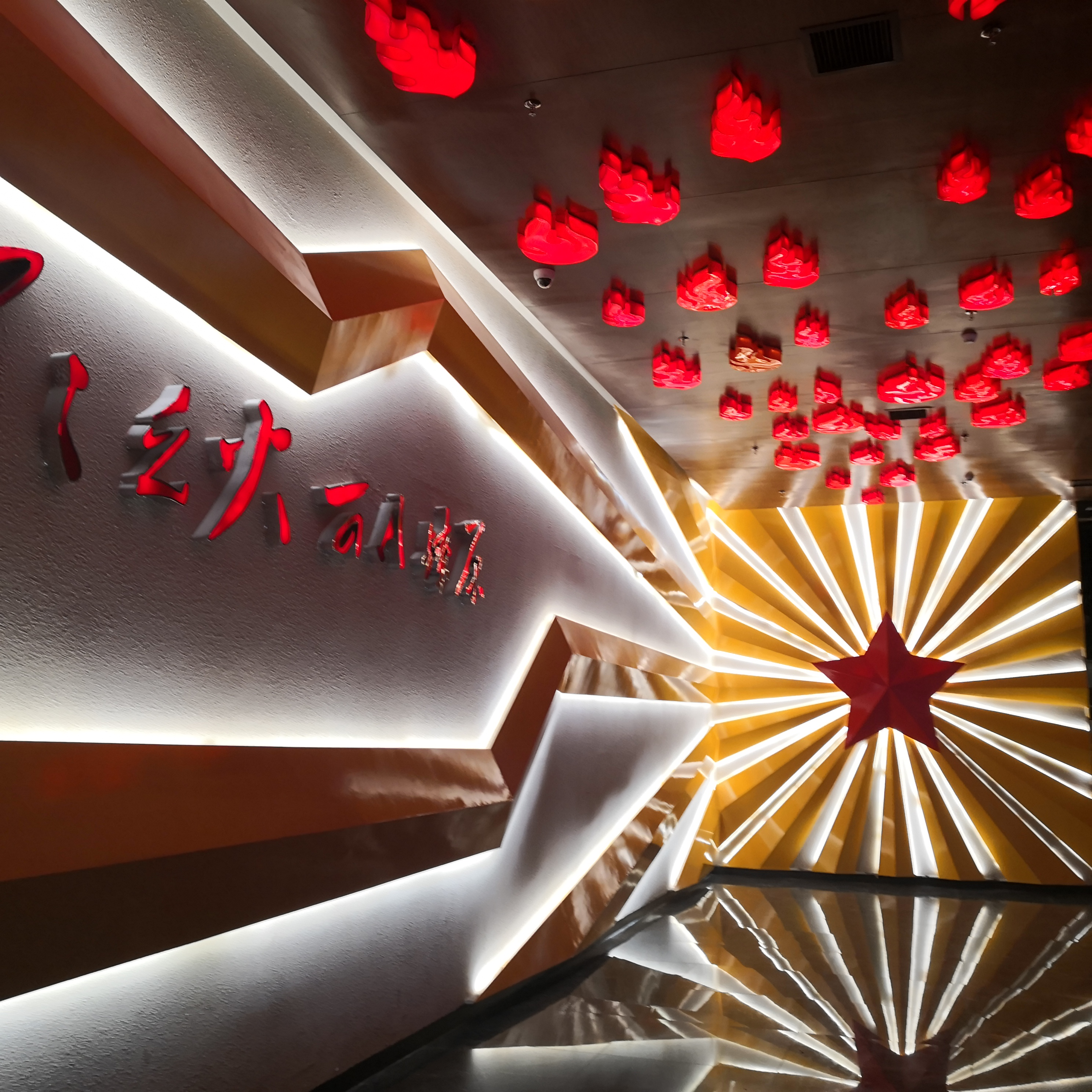
Museum of Heroic Deeds

The cemetery was enlisted in the second cohort of Xinjiang Uygur Autonomous Region Cultural Relics Protection Units in 1962, and National Key Martyrs' Memorial Buildings Protection Units in 1986. It became one of the National Patriotism Education Demonstration Bases in 1997, and national AAA-level tourist attractions in 2011. It was also included in the National List of Antiwar Memorial Facilities and Sites and the initial cohort of the List of Revolutionary Cultural Relics in Xinjiang Uygur Autonomous Region in 2015 and 2021.
