= Latif, Hamadan =

Latif لطيف
- Village
- Location within Iran
- Coordinates: 34°44′41″N 48°03′20″E
- Country: Iran
- Province: Hamadan
- County: Asadabad
- Bakhsh: Central
- Rural District: Darbandrud

Population (2006)
  - Total: 160
- Time zone: UTC+3:30 (IRST)
  - Summer (DST): UTC+4:30 (IRDT)

Latif (Persian: لطيف, also Romanized as Laţīf; also known as Laţīfābād) is a village in Darbandrud Rural District, in the Central District of Asadabad County, Hamadan Province, Iran. At the 2006 census, its population was 160, in 37 families.
