= Lateef (film) =

- Directed by: Israr Ahmed
- Written by: S Sachindra; Badshah Khan
- Screenplay by: S Sachindra; Badshah Khan
- Produced by: Amina Ahmed
- Starring: See below
- Music by: Various Artists
- Production companies: Screenshot Media & Entertainment
- Distributed by: Screenshot Media & Entertainment
- Release date: 15 May 2015
- Running time: 118 minutes
- Country: India
- Language: Hindi
- Budget: ₹4.6 crore (US$540,000)
- Box office: ₹0.67 crore (US$79,000)

Lateef is a 2005 Indian thriller film directed by Israr Ahmed and produced by Amina Ahmed under the Screenshot Media & Entertainment banner. It was released on 15 May 2015.

== Cast ==
- Nawazuddin Siddiqui as Lateef
- Murli Sharma as Zafar Dongri
- Mukesh Tiwari as ACP Sawant
- Kader Khan as Police Commissioner Khan
- Pratima Kazmi as Mafia Boss Lady
- Akhilendra Mishra as Minister Narayan Dutt Agrawal (NDA)
- Sudesh Berry as Drug-addict Ajeet
- Pawan Singh
- Raza Murad as Narrator
- KANIKA SAHA AS A REPORTER

== Plot ==
The plot of the movie revolves around the unholy nexus of Drug Mafia with Corrupt Politicians in power, and their constant struggle with honest police officers ACP Sawant and Commissioner Khan. An innocent and aspiring medical student Lateef is incorrectly implicated by Police in a drug-peddling case. Lateef is convicted and awarded seven years imprisonment. After getting released from Jail, Lateef tries to search for his ex flame from his college days, who has now become a prostitute in red light area. Depressed and dejected Lateef turns to drugs and becomes a permanent addict.

ACP Sawant at the behest Commissioner Khan, arrests Zafar Dongri from one of his hideouts and then later on proceeds to arrest Minister Narayan Dutt Agrawal, whose own daughter Divya turns police witness in Social Worker Anand Kalsiwal and his son Jeet Kalsiwal's murder cases.

In the end, Lateef's friend Ajeet dies and is taken away by Municipal Hospital Ambulance. Lateef is reunited with his estranged sister and promises to never do drugs again. Minister Narayan Dutt Agrawal is shown taking oath again as a Minister, which infuriates ACP Sawant who is shown breaking his Television set.

== Music ==
1. " Chain Milta Nahin" – Udit Narayan, Sadhna Singh, Shahid Mallya
2. "Dekhe The Kitne Sapne" – Kumar Sanu
3. "Kash Me" – Aishwarya Nigam, Sonika Sharma
4. "Rasme Mohabbat Ki" – Adnan Sami
