= Alternates of the 10th Central Committee of the Chinese Communist Party =

The 10th Central Committee of the Chinese Communist Party was elected by the 10th National Congress in 1973. 124 individuals served as alternates during this electoral term.

== Alternates ==
Alternates of the 10th Central Committee of the Chinese Communist Party
Name		9th CC	11th CC	Birth	PM	Death	Birthplace	Ethnicity	Gender	Ref.
Bai Dongcai	白栋材	Nonmember	Member	1916	1935	2014	Shaanxi	Han	Male	
Bu Guxiang	卜谷香	Nonmember	Alternate	1936	1959	Alive	Hunan	Han	Male	
Chen Daifu	陈代富	Nonmember	Nonmember	1942	1963	Alive	Sichuan	Han	Male	
Chen Hefa	陈和发	Alternate	Nonmember	1915	1953	2001	Jiangsu	Han	Male	
Chen Jiazhong (Note: Chen Jiazhong was removed at an unspecified date after the Cultural Revolution.)	陈佳忠	Nonmember	Nonmember	1933	1954	Alive	Fujian	Han	Male	
Chen Peizhen (Note: Chen Peizhen was removed at an unspecified date after the Cultural Revolution.)	陈佩珍	Nonmember	Nonmember	1944	1966	Alive	Zhejiang	Han	Female	
Chen Yubao	陈玉宝	Nonmember	Alternate	1937	1961	Alive	Shandong	Han	Male	
Cui Xiufan	崔修范	Alternate	Nonmember	1938	1952	Alive	Liaoning	Han	Male	
Daluo (Note: Daluo was removed at an unspecified date after the Cultural Revolution.)	达洛	Alternate	Nonmember	1930	1954	1998	Qinghai	Tibetan	Male	
Deng Hua	邓华	Alternate	Alternate	1910	1927	1980	Hunan	Han	Male	
Fan Xiaoju	樊孝菊	Alternate	Nonmember	1932	1952	2015	Jiangxi	Han	Female	
Feng Pinde	冯品德	Nonmember	Alternate	1939	1966	Alive	Shandong	Han	Male	
Feng Zhanwu	冯占武	Alternate	Alternate	1938	1956	Alive	Jilin	Han	Male	
Gao Shulan	高淑兰	Nonmember	Nonmember	1942	1969	Alive	Tianjin	Han	Female	
Guo Yaoqing	郭耀卿	Nonmember	Alternate	1935	1956	Alive	Guangxi	Zhuang	Male	
Hu Jindi	胡金娣	Nonmember	Alternate	1943	1966	Alive	Jiangsu	Han	Female	
Hu Liangcai	胡良才	Alternate	Alternate	1939	1959	Alive	Hebei	Han	Male	
Hu Wei	胡炜	Alternate	Nonmember	1920	1938	2018	Henan	Han	Male	
Huang Bingxiu	黄炳秀	Nonmember	Nonmember	1938	1956	Alive	Hunan	Han	Female	
Huang Chenglian	黄成连	Alternate	Nonmember	1935	1956	Alive	Shaanxi	Han	Male	
Huang Ronghai	黄荣海	Alternate	Alternate	1915	1935	1996	Jiangxi	Han	Male	
Huang Wenming	黄文明	Alternate	Nonmember	1909	1930	1995	Jiangxi	Han	Male	
Huang Zhizhen	黄知真	Nonmember	Member	1920	1935	1993	Jiangxi	Han	Male	
Huang Zuozhen	黄作珍	Alternate	Alternate	1914	1930	1991	Jiangxi	Han	Male	
Janabil	贾那布尔	Nonmember	Alternate	1934	1953	2024	Xinjiang	Kazakh	Male	
Jiang Baodi	蒋宝娣	Alternate	Alternate	1938	1961	Alive	Zhejiang	Han	Female	
Jiang Hua	江华	Nonmember	Member	1907	1925	1999	Hunan	Yao	Male	
Jiang Weiqing	江渭清	Nonmember	Member	1910	1929	2000	Hunan	Han	Male	
Kang Jianmin (Note: Wang Deshan was removed at an unspecified date in January 1977.)	康健民	Alternate	Nonmember	1916	1933	1977	Gansu	Han	Male	
Kang Lin	康林	Alternate	Alternate	1916	1933	1995	Jiangxi	Han	Male	
Li Dingshan (Note: Li Dingshan was removed at an unspecified date after the Cultural Revolution.)	李定山	Alternate	Nonmember	1935	1962	1993	Anhui	Han	Male	
Li Huamin	李化民	Alternate	Alternate	1915	1933	2002	Gansu	Han	Male	
Li Rinai	厉日耐	Nonmember	Alternate	1935	1955	2002	Shandong	Han	Male	
Li Shoulin	李守林	Alternate	Alternate	1927	1950	1992	Shaanxi	Han	Male	
Li Yuan	黎原	Alternate	Alternate	1917	1938	2008	Henan	Han	Male	
Li Yuesong	李跃松	Alternate	Nonmember	1930	1960	Alive	Shandong	Han	Male	
Li Zugen	李祖根	Nonmember	Alternate	1939	1961	Alive	Jiangsu	Han	Male	
Liao Zhigao	廖志高	Nonmember	Member	1913	1934	2000	Sichuan	Han	Male	
Lin Liming	林李明	Nonmember	Member	1910	1933	1977	Guangdong	Han	Male	
Liu Chunqiao	刘春樵	Alternate	Member	1923	1950	2006	Hunan	Han	Male	
Liu Guangtao	刘光涛	Nonmember	Member	1920	1938	2011	Shaanxi	Han	Male	
Liu Xiyao	刘西尧	Alternate	Alternate	1916	1937	2013	Hunan	Han	Male	
Liu Zhenhua	刘振华	Alternate	Alternate	1921	1938	2018	Shandong	Han	Male	
Long Guangqian	隆光前	Alternate	Nonmember	1942	1968	Alive	Hunan	Han	Male	
Lu Dadong	鲁大东	Alternate	Member	1915	1938	1998	Hebei	Han	Male	
Lu Jinlong	陆金龙	Nonmember	Alternate	1936	1965	Alive	Jiangsu	Han	Male	
Lu Zhongyang	卢忠阳	Nonmember	Alternate	1936	1959	Alive	Henan	Han	Male	
Luo Chunyu	罗春俤	Alternate	Nonmember	1925	1953	1990	Fujian	Han	Female	
Lu Cunjie	吕存姐	Alternate	Alternate	1939	1966	Alive	Qinghai	Tu	Female	
Lu He	吕和	Alternate	Alternate	1911	1948	1979	Inner Mongolia	Han	Male	
Ma Jinhua	马金花	Nonmember	Alternate	1938	1961	Alive	Ningxia	Hui	Female	
Ma Lixin	马立新	Nonmember	Nonmember	1929	1947	Alive	Hebei	Han	Male	
Ma Ming	马明	Nonmember	Alternate	1937	1959	2012	Shanxi	Han	Male	
Ma Xiaoliu	马小六	Nonmember	Nonmember	1938	1959	1993	Hebei	Han	Male	
Pan Meiying	盘美英	Alternate	Alternate	1930	1957	Alive	Guangxi	Yao	Female	
Pei Zhouyu	裴周玉	Alternate	Nonmember	1912	1932	2015	Hunan	Han	Male	
Peng Chong	彭冲	Alternate	Member	1915	1934	2010	Fujian	Han	Male	
Peng Guihe (Note: Peng Guihe was removed at an unspecified date after the Cultural Revolution.)	彭贵和	Alternate	Nonmember	1926	1954	2000	Yunnan	Han	Male	
Qian Xuesen	钱学森	Alternate	Alternate	1911	1958	2009	Zhejiang	Han	Male	
Qilin Wangdan	七林旺丹	Alternate	Alternate	1935	1959	2016	Yunnan	Tibetan	Male	
Ren Rong	任荣	Nonmember	Member	1917	1934	2017	Sichuan	Han	Male	
Rouzi Turdi	肉孜·吐尔迪	Alternate	Alternate	1921	1952	1982	Xinjiang	Uyghur	Male	
Ruan Bosheng	阮泊生	Alternate	Member	1916	1933	2017	Hebei	Han	Male	
She Jide	佘积德	Nonmember	Nonmember	1916	1933	1981	Anhui	Han	Male	
Shen Maogong (Note: Wang Deshan was removed at the 3rd Plenary Session of the 10th Central Committee, held on 16–21 July 1977.)	申茂功	Nonmember	Alternate	1940	1958	Alive	Henan	Han	Male	
Shi Shaohua	石少华	Alternate	Nonmember	1918	1938	1998	Guangdong	Han	Male	
Song Qingyou	宋庆友	Nonmember	Alternate	1938	1959	1988	Shandong	Han	Male	
Song Shilun	宋时轮	Nonmember	Member	1907	1926	1991	Hunan	Han	Male	
Song Shuanglai	宋双来	Alternate	Nonmember	1926	1941	2016	Hebei	Han	Male	
Sun Jian	孙健	Nonmember	Nonmember	1936	1958	1997	Tianjin	Han	Male	
Sun Yuguo	孙玉国	Nonmember	Nonmember	1941	1963	Alive	Liaoning	Han	Male	
Tang Kebi	唐克碧	Nonmember	Alternate	1942	1961	Alive	Sichuan	Han	Female	
Tang Liang	唐亮	Alternate	Alternate	1910	1930	1986	Hunan	Han	Male	
Tang Wensheng	唐闻生	Nonmember	Alternate	1943	1959	Alive	United States	Han	Female	
Tie Ying	铁瑛	Nonmember	Member	1916	1937	2009	Henan	Han	Male	
Wang Baide	王百得	Nonmember	Nonmember	1934	1958	2005	Hebei	Han	Male	
Wang Deshan (Note: Wang Deshan was removed at an unspecified date after the Cultural Revolution.)	王德山	Nonmember	Nonmember	1926	1954	1980	Liaoning	Han	Male	
Wang Guanglin	王光临	Alternate	Nonmember	1937	1959	Alive	Shanxi	Han	Male	
Wang Jiadao	汪家道	Alternate	Nonmember	1916	1932	1992	Anhui	Han	Male	
Wang Jingsheng (Note: Wang Jingsheng was removed at an unspecified date after the Cultural Revolution.)	王景升	Nonmember	Nonmember	1939	1960	Alive	Liaoning	Han	Male	
Wang Liusheng	王六生	Alternate	Alternate	1917	1932	1995	Jiangxi	Han	Male	
Wang Meiji	王美季	Nonmember	Nonmember	1942	1968	Alive	Guangdong	Han	Female	
Wang Qian	王谦	Nonmember	Member	1917	1936	2007	Shanxi	Han	Male	
Wang Ti	王体	Alternate	Nonmember	1914	1958	1990	Shanxi	Han	Male	
Wang Xiangjun (Note: Wang Xiangjun was removed at an unspecified date after the Cultural Revolution.)	汪湘君	Nonmember	Nonmember	1938	1970	Alive	Zhejiang	Han	Female	
Wang Zhiqiang	王志强	Alternate	Nonmember	1914	1939	1996	Henan	Hui	Male	
Wen Xianglan	文香兰	Alternate	Alternate	1934	1954	Alive	Henan	Han	Female	
Wu Congshu	吴从树	Nonmember	Nonmember	1941	1958	Alive	Anhui	Han	Male	
Wu Jinquan	吴金全	Alternate	Alternate	1934	1954	Alive	Henan	Han	Female	
Wu Xiangbi	吴向必	Nonmember	Alternate	1926	1952	1997	Guizhou	Miao	Male	
Wu Yude (Note: Wu Yude was removed at an unspecified date after the Cultural Revolution.)	吴玉德	Nonmember	Nonmember	1933	1969	Alive	Shandong	Han	Male	
Wu Zhong	吴忠	Alternate	Alternate	1921	1935	1990	Sichuan	Han	Male	
Xiang Zhonghua	向仲华	Nonmember	Alternate	1912	1930	1981	Yannan	Han	Male	
Xiao Ke	肖克	Nonmember	Member	1907	1927	2008	Hunan	Han	Male	
Xie Jiatang (Note: Xie Jiatang was removed at an unspecified date after the Cultural Revolution.)	谢家塘	Alternate	Nonmember	1935	1955	Alive	Hunan	Han	Male	
Xie Wangchun	谢望春	Alternate	Nonmember	1930	1956	2011	Hubei	Tujia	Female	
Xie Zhenhua	谢振华	Nonmember	Nonmember	1916	1930	2011	Jiangxi	Han	Male	
Xu Chi	徐驰	Alternate	Alternate	1913	1956	2012	Hubei	Han	Male	
Xue Jinlian	薛金莲	Nonmember	Alternate	1942	1964	Alive	Inner Mongolia	Han	Female	
Yang Dayi	杨大易	Nonmember	Alternate	1919	1934	1997	Sichuan	Han	Male	
Yang Fuzhen	杨富珍	Nonmember	Alternate	1932	1949	Alive	Jiangsu	Han	Female	
Yang Gui	杨贵	Nonmember	Nonmember	1928	1943	2018	Henan	Han	Male	
Yang Junsheng	杨俊生	Alternate	Alternate	1916	1935	1998	Jiangxi	Han	Male	
Yang Polan	杨坡兰	Nonmember	Nonmember	1941	1956	Alive	Shandong	Han	Female	
Yang Zong	央宗	Alternate	Nonmember	1943	1964	Alive	Tibet	Tibetan	Female	
Yao Lianwei	姚连蔚	Alternate	Nonmember	1935	1962	2012	Shaanxi	Han	Male	
Yao Yilin	姚依林	Nonmember	Member	1917	1935	1994	Anhui	Han	Male	
Ye Fei	叶飞	Nonmember	Member	1914	1932	1999	Philippines	Han	Male	
Zhang Guoquan (Note: Zhang Guoquan was removed at an unspecified date after the Cultural Revolution.)	张国权	Nonmember	Nonmember	1940	1970	Alive	Zhejiang	Han	Male	
Zhang Huailian	张怀连	Nonmember	Alternate	1933	1956	Alive	Shandong	Han	Male	
Zhang Jianglin	张江霖	Alternate	Nonmember	1917	1937	1999	Sichuan	Han	Male	
Zhang Jihui	张积慧	Alternate	Alternate	1927	1945	2023	Shandong	Han	Male	
Zhang Linchi	张林池	Nonmember	Alternate	1911	1937	2002	Hebei	Han	Male	
Zhang Lingbin	张令彬	Alternate	Alternate	1902	1926	1987	Hunan	Han	Male	
Zhang Shizhong (Note: Zhang Shizhong was removed at an unspecified date after the Cultural Revolution.)	张世忠	Alternate	Nonmember	1936	1960	1994	Hebei	Han	Male	
Zhang Sizhou	张泗洲	Alternate	Nonmember	1920	1952	1980	Sichuan	Han	Male	
Zhang Yingcai	张英才	Alternate	Nonmember	1924	1942	2017	Shanxi	Han	Male	
Zhao Feng	赵峰	Alternate	Nonmember	1914	1938	2007	Henan	Han	Male	
Zhao Xinchu	赵辛初	Nonmember	Member	1915	1938	1991	Hubei	Han	Male	
Zhao Xingyuan	赵兴元	Alternate	Alternate	1925	1940	2016	Shandong	Han	Male	
Zheng Sansheng	郑三生	Alternate	Alternate	1917	1934	1990	Jiangxi	Han	Male	
Zhu Guangya	朱光亚	Alternate	Member	1924	1956	2011	Hubei	Han	Male	
Zhu Huifen	诸惠芬	Nonmember	Nonmember	1937	1962	Alive	Shanghai	Han	Female	
Zhu Kejia	朱克家	Nonmember	Nonmember	1950	1973	Alive	Shanghai	Han	Male	
