= Alternates of the 9th Central Committee of the Chinese Communist Party =

The 9th Central Committee of the Chinese Communist Party was elected by the 9th National Congress in 1969. 109 individuals served as alternates during this electoral term.

== Composition ==
Alternates of the 9th Central Committee of the Chinese Communist Party
Name		8th CC	10th CC	Birth	PM	Death	Birthplace	Ethnicity	Gender	Ref.
Cen Guorong	岑国荣	Nonmember	Member	1934	1955	2018	Guangxi	Han	Male	
Chen Ganfeng	陈敢峰	Nonmember	Nonmember	1943	1968	Alive	Fujian	Han	Male	
Chen Hefa	陈和发	Nonmember	Alternate	1915	1953	2001	Jiangsu	Han	Male	
Chen Huatang	陈华堂	Nonmember	Nonmember	1911	1931	1983	Hubei	Han	Male	
Chen Liyun (Note: Chen Liyun stood accused of being involved in a coup against Mao Zedong, known as Project 571. He was expelled from the party in September 1971.)	陈励耘	Nonmember	Expelled	1919	1938	2004	Sichuan	Han	Male	
Chen Renqi	陈仁麒	Nonmember	Nonmember	1913	1932	1994	Fujian	Han	Male	
Cui Hailong	崔海龙	Nonmember	Member	1928	1947	1996	Jilin	Korean	Male	
Cui Xiufan	崔修范	Nonmember	Alternate	1938	1952	Alive	Liaoning	Han	Male	
Daluo	达洛	Nonmember	Alternate	1930	1954	1998	Qinghai	Tibetan	Male	
Deng Hua	邓华	Member	Alternate	1910	1927	1980	Hunan	Han	Male	
Fan Deling	樊德玲	Nonmember	Member	1933	1960	1999	Hebei	Han	Male	
Fan Xiaoju	樊孝菊	Nonmember	Alternate	1932	1952	2015	Jiangxi	Han	Female	
Fang Ming	方铭	Nonmember	Nonmember	1921	1938	1981	Zhejiang	Han	Male	
Fang Yi	方毅	Alternate	Member	1916	1931	1997	Fujian	Han	Male	
Feng Zhanwu	冯占武	Nonmember	Alternate	1938	1956	Alive	Jilin	Han	Male	
Fu Chuanzuo	傅传作	Nonmember	Member	1914	1931	1982	Hubei	Han	Male	
Geng Qichang	耿起昌	Nonmember	Member	1915	1938	1991	Shanxi	Han	Male	
Guo Hongjie	郭宏杰	Nonmember	Member	1937	1956	2008	Anhui	Han	Male	
Guo Yufeng	郭玉峰	Nonmember	Member	1918	1938	2000	Hebei	Han	Male	
Han Ying	韩英	Nonmember	Member	1935	1956	Alive	Liaoning	Han	Male	
Hu Liangcai	胡良才	Nonmember	Alternate	1939	1959	Alive	Hebei	Han	Male	
Hu Wei	胡炜	Nonmember	Alternate	1920	1938	2018	Henan	Han	Male	
Hua Linsen	华林森	Nonmember	Member	1926	1956	1987	Shanghai	Han	Male	
Huang Chenglian	黄成连	Nonmember	Alternate	1935	1956	Alive	Shaanxi	Han	Male	
Huang Ronghai	黄荣海	Nonmember	Alternate	1915	1935	1996	Jiangxi	Han	Male	
Huang Wenming	黄文明	Nonmember	Alternate	1909	1930	1995	Jiangxi	Han	Male	
Huang Zhiyong	黄志勇	Nonmember	Nonmember	1914	1930	2011	Jiangxi	Han	Male	
Huang Zuozhen	黄作珍	Nonmember	Alternate	1914	1930	1991	Jiangxi	Han	Male	
Jiang Baodi	蒋宝娣	Nonmember	Alternate	1938	1961	Alive	Zhejiang	Han	Female	
Jiao Linyi	焦林义	Nonmember	Member	1920	1937	2005	Hebei	Han	Male	
Jin Zumin	金祖敏	Nonmember	Member	1934	1960	1997	Zhejiang	Han	Male	
Kang Jianmin	康健民	Nonmember	Alternate	1916	1933	1977	Gansu	Han	Male	
Kang Lin	康林	Nonmember	Alternate	1916	1933	1995	Jiangxi	Han	Male	
Lan Rongyu	蓝荣玉	Nonmember	Nonmember	1914	1933	1980	Fujian	Han	Male	
Lan Yinong	蓝亦农	Nonmember	Nonmember	1919	1938	2008	Hunan	Han	Male	
Li Dingshan	李定山	Nonmember	Alternate	1935	1962	1993	Anhui	Han	Male	
Li Huamin	李化民	Nonmember	Alternate	1915	1933	2002	Gansu	Han	Male	
Li Li	李立	Nonmember	Nonmember	1908	1927	2006	Jiangxi	Han	Male	
Li Shoulin	李守林	Nonmember	Alternate	1927	1950	1992	Shaanxi	Han	Male	
Li Shumao	李书茂	Nonmember	Nonmember	1914	1950	1993	Shaanxi	Han	Male	
Li Yuan	黎原	Nonmember	Alternate	1917	1938	2008	Henan	Han	Male	
Li Yuesong	李跃松	Nonmember	Alternate	1930	1960	Alive	Shandong	Han	Male	
Li Zaihan	李再含	Nonmember	Nonmember	1919	1938	1975	Sichuan	Han	Male	
Liang Jintang	梁锦棠	Nonmember	Member	1940	1966	Alive	Guangdong	Han	Male	
Liu Chunqiao	刘春樵	Nonmember	Alternate	1923	1950	2006	Hunan	Han	Male	
Liu Haotian	刘浩天	Nonmember	Nonmember	1912	1931	1984	Jiangxi	Han	Male	
Liu Xiyao	刘西尧	Nonmember	Alternate	1916	1937	2013	Hunan	Han	Male	
Liu Zhenhua	刘振华	Nonmember	Alternate	1921	1938	2018	Shandong	Han	Male	
Long Guangqian	隆光前	Nonmember	Alternate	1942	1968	Alive	Hunan	Han	Male	
Lu Cunjie	吕存姐	Nonmember	Alternate	1939	1966	Alive	Qinghai	Tu	Female	
Lu Dadong	鲁大东	Nonmember	Alternate	1915	1938	1998	Hebei	Han	Male	
Lu He	吕和	Nonmember	Alternate	1911	1948	1979	Inner Mongolia	Han	Male	
Luo Chunyu	罗春俤	Nonmember	Alternate	1925	1953	1990	Fujian	Han	Female	
Luo Xikang	罗锡康	Nonmember	Member	1931	1960	2002	Guizhou	Han	Male	
Luo Yuanfa	罗元发	Nonmember	Nonmember	1910	1929	2010	Fujian	Han	Male	
Ma Tianshui	马天水	Nonmember	Member	1912	1931	1988	Hebei	Han	Male	
Nie Yuanzi	聂元梓	Nonmember	Nonmember	1921	1938	2019	Henan	Han	Female	
Pan Meiying	盘美英	Nonmember	Alternate	1930	1957	Alive	Guangxi	Yao	Female	
Pei Zhouyu	裴周玉	Nonmember	Alternate	1912	1932	2015	Hunan	Han	Male	
Peng Chong	彭冲	Nonmember	Alternate	1915	1934	2010	Fujian	Han	Male	
Peng Guihe	彭贵和	Nonmember	Alternate	1926	1954	2000	Yunnan	Han	Male	
Qian Xuesen	钱学森	Nonmember	Alternate	1911	1958	2009	Zhejiang	Han	Male	
Qilin Wangdan	七林旺丹	Nonmember	Alternate	1935	1959	2016	Yunnan	Tibetan	Male	
Rouzi Turdi	肉孜·吐尔迪	Nonmember	Alternate	1921	1952	1982	Xinjiang	Uyghur	Male	
Ruan Bosheng	阮泊生	Nonmember	Alternate	1916	1933	2017	Hebei	Han	Male	
Shi Shaohua	石少华	Nonmember	Alternate	1918	1938	1998	Guangdong	Han	Male	
Shu Jicheng	舒积成	Nonmember	Nonmember	1933	1956	Alive	Chongqing	Han	Male	
Song Shuanglai	宋双来	Nonmember	Alternate	1926	1941	2016	Hebei	Han	Male	
Tan Qilong	谭启龙	Nonmember	Member	1913	1933	2003	Jiangxi	She	Male	
Tang Liang	唐亮	Alternate	Alternate	1910	1930	1986	Hunan	Han	Male	
Wang Enmao	王恩茂	Member	Nonmember	1913	1930	2001	Jiangxi	Han	Male	
Wang Guanglin	王光临	Nonmember	Alternate	1937	1959	Alive	Shanxi	Han	Male	
Wang Jiadao	汪家道	Nonmember	Alternate	1916	1932	1992	Anhui	Han	Male	
Wang Liusheng	王六生	Nonmember	Alternate	1917	1932	1995	Jiangxi	Han	Male	
Wang Ti	王体	Nonmember	Alternate	1914	1958	1990	Shanxi	Han	Male	
Wang Weiguo (Note: Wang Weiguo stood accused of being involved in a coup against Mao Zedong, known as Project 571. He was expelled from the party in September 1971.)	王维国	Nonmember	Expelled	1919	1938	1993	Hebei	Han	Male	
Wang Xin	王新	Nonmember	Nonmember	1919	1938	1991	Shandong	Han	Male	
Wang Zhiqiang	王志强	Nonmember	Alternate	1914	1939	1996	Henan	Hui	Male	
Wei Zuzhen	韦祖珍	Nonmember	Nonmember	1912	1932	1982	Guangxi	Zhuang	Male	
Wen Xianglan	文香兰	Nonmember	Alternate	1934	1954	Alive	Henan	Han	Female	
Wu Chunren	吴纯仁	Nonmember	Nonmember	1921	1937	2010	Shaanxi	Han	Male	
Wu Jinquan	吴金全	Nonmember	Alternate	1925	1955	Alive	Chongqing	Han	Male	
Wu Zhong	吴忠	Nonmember	Alternate	1921	1935	1990	Sichuan	Han	Male	
Xie Jiatang	谢家塘	Nonmember	Alternate	1935	1955	Alive	Hunan	Han	Male	
Xie Wangchun	谢望春	Nonmember	Alternate	1930	1956	2011	Hubei	Tujia	Female	
Xu Chi	徐驰	Nonmember	Alternate	1913	1956	2012	Hubei	Han	Male	
Yang Huanmin	杨焕民	Nonmember	Nonmember	1912	1934	1994	Hubei	Han	Male	
Yang Junsheng	杨俊生	Nonmember	Alternate	1916	1935	1998	Jiangxi	Han	Male	
Yang Zong	央宗	Nonmember	Alternate	1943	1964	Alive	Tibet	Tibetan	Female	
Yao Lianwei	姚连蔚	Nonmember	Alternate	1935	1962	2012	Shaanxi	Han	Male	
Yi Yaocai	易耀彩	Nonmember	Nonmember	1917	1931	1990	Jiangxi	Han	Male	
You Taizhong	尤太忠	Nonmember	Member	1918	1934	1998	Henan	Han	Male	
Zeng Yongya	曾雍雅	Nonmember	Nonmember	1917	1932	1995	Jiangxi	Han	Male	
Zhang Jianglin	张江霖	Nonmember	Alternate	1917	1937	1999	Sichuan	Han	Male	
Zhang Jihui	张积慧	Nonmember	Alternate	1927	1945	2023	Shandong	Han	Male	
Zhang Lingbin	张令彬	Nonmember	Alternate	1902	1926	1987	Hunan	Han	Male	
Zhang Riqing	张日清	Nonmember	Nonmember	1917	1932	2004	Fujian	Han	Male	
Zhang Shizhong	张世忠	Nonmember	Alternate	1936	1960	1994	Hebei	Han	Male	
Zhang Sizhou	张泗洲	Nonmember	Alternate	1920	1952	1980	Sichuan	Han	Male	
Zhang Xiting	张西挺	Nonmember	Nonmember	1926	1941	1993	Henan	Han	Female	
Zhang Xiuchuan	张秀川	Nonmember	Nonmember	1919	1936	2005	Hebei	Han	Male	
Zhang Yancheng	张延成	Nonmember	Member	1942	1964	Alive	Shandong	Han	Male	
Zhang Yingcai	张英才	Nonmember	Alternate	1924	1942	2017	Shanxi	Han	Male	
Zhao Feng	赵峰	Nonmember	Alternate	1914	1938	2007	Henan	Han	Male	
Zhao Qimin	赵启民	Nonmember	Nonmember	1910	1930	1997	Shaanxi	Han	Male	
Zhao Xingyuan	赵兴元	Nonmember	Alternate	1925	1940	2016	Shandong	Han	Male	
Zheng Sansheng	郑三生	Nonmember	Alternate	1917	1934	1990	Jiangxi	Han	Male	
Zhu Guangya	朱光亚	Nonmember	Alternate	1924	1956	2011	Hubei	Han	Male	
Yan Zhongchuan	阎仲川	Nonmember	Nonmember	1922	1939	2002	Hebei	Han	Male	
