= Nurmuhemmet Tohti =

Uyghur writer (1949–2019)

Nurmuhemmet Tohti (also Nurmemet Tohti, Nurmamat Tohti) (December 1949 – 31 May 2019) was a prominent Uyghur writer.

== Biography ==
Tohti was born in December 1949 in the village of Tewekul in Hotan prefecture, Xinjiang, China. He graduated from Xinjiang University in 1977 and worked as a lecturer at Hotan Pedagogical College before becoming a minor official at the Hotan Prefectural Government. He was a member of the Xinjiang Writers Association. Shohret Hoshur writing for the Radio Free Asia noted that he "was revered within his community for having left an indelible mark on Uyghur literature." His works touched upon contemporary and sometimes controversial issues faced by Uyghurs such as desertification, hardships originating from corrupted officials and the impact of ethnic Chinese settlers in Xinjiang. One of his works, Letter from Hotan, was about forced labour in silk farms; another, Son of Desert, focuses on the efforts to save endangered species in the Xinjiang. In 2012 he visited his relatives in Canada.

In 2019 international media and human rights and cultural organizations (such as PEN America) reported that Tohti was detained from November 2018 to March 2019 in the system of Xinjiang re-education camps, where he was denied treatment for diabetes and heart disease. He was released from the camp system after his health deteriorated, and died on 31 May 2019. His granddaughter in Canada noted that his family in China was threatened by the authorities who cautioned them against informing their relatives abroad, including her, about his death.

In response, the Chinese officials released a statement confirming that Tohti died shortly after "suffering an acute myocardial infarction at home" on 31 May 2019 but also denying that he was ever detained in a re-education camp. They did say that he "was asked to live at a designated place under surveillance by local public security" from 14 December to 10 March because of participation in "illegal religious activities". The authorities also said that Tohti literary works "lean toward extremism in some parts".
