= Zunun Taipov =

Chinese Tatar military officer (1917–1984)

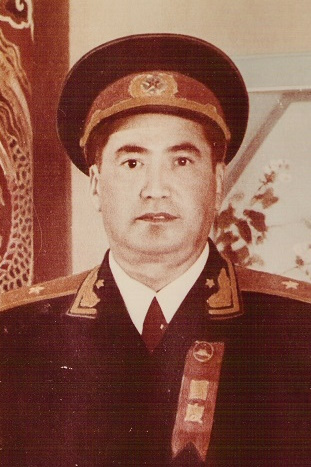
- Born: 18 August 1917; Jarkent, Russian Empire
- Died: 12 October 1984 (aged 67); Alma-Ata, Kazakh SSR, Soviet Union
- Burial place: Dostyk, Kazakhstan
- Military career
- Allegiance: East Turkestan Republic (1944–1946); People's Republic of China (1949–1961)
- Branch: East Turkestan National Army (1945–1949); People's Liberation Army (1949–1961)
- Rank: Major General of the PLA
- Conflicts: Ili Rebellion (1944–1946)

Chinese name
- Simplified Chinese: 祖农·太也夫
- Traditional Chinese: 祖農·太也夫
Transcriptions
Standard Mandarin
- Hanyu Pinyin: Zǔnóng Tàiyěfū

Alternative Chinese name
- Simplified Chinese: 祖农·塔约夫
- Traditional Chinese: 祖農·塔約夫
Transcriptions
Standard Mandarin
- Hanyu Pinyin: Zǔnóng Tǎyuēfū

Uyghur name
- Uyghur: زۇنۇن تايوف
Transcriptions
- Latin Yëziqi: Zunun Tayof
- Siril Yëziqi: Зунун Тайоф

Russian name
- Russian: Зунун Таипович Таипов

Zunun Taipovich Taipov (18 August 1917 – 12 October 1984) was a Chinese Tatar military officer in the armies of the Second East Turkestan Republic and the People's Republic of China. He defected to the Soviet Union in the 1962 Yi–Ta incident, amid the Sino-Soviet split. He died in Alma-Ata (Almaty), Kazakhstan, in 1984.
