= Tacheng =

Tacheng: 塔城市 (Chinese); چۆچەك شەھىرى (Uyghur); شاۋەشەك قالاسى (Kazakh); Qoqek, Chuguchak, Tarbagatay
- County-level city
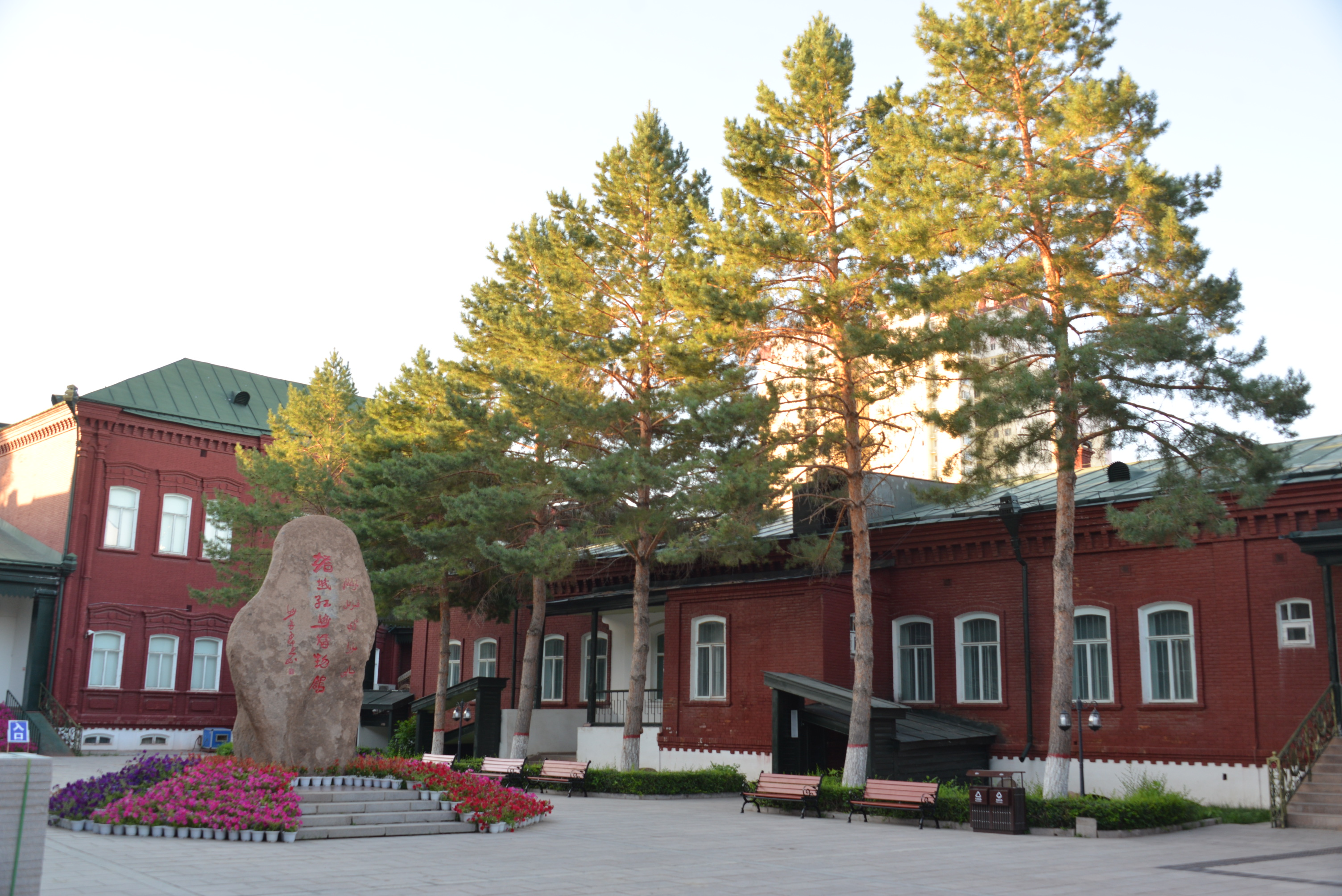
- Red Mansion of Tacheng

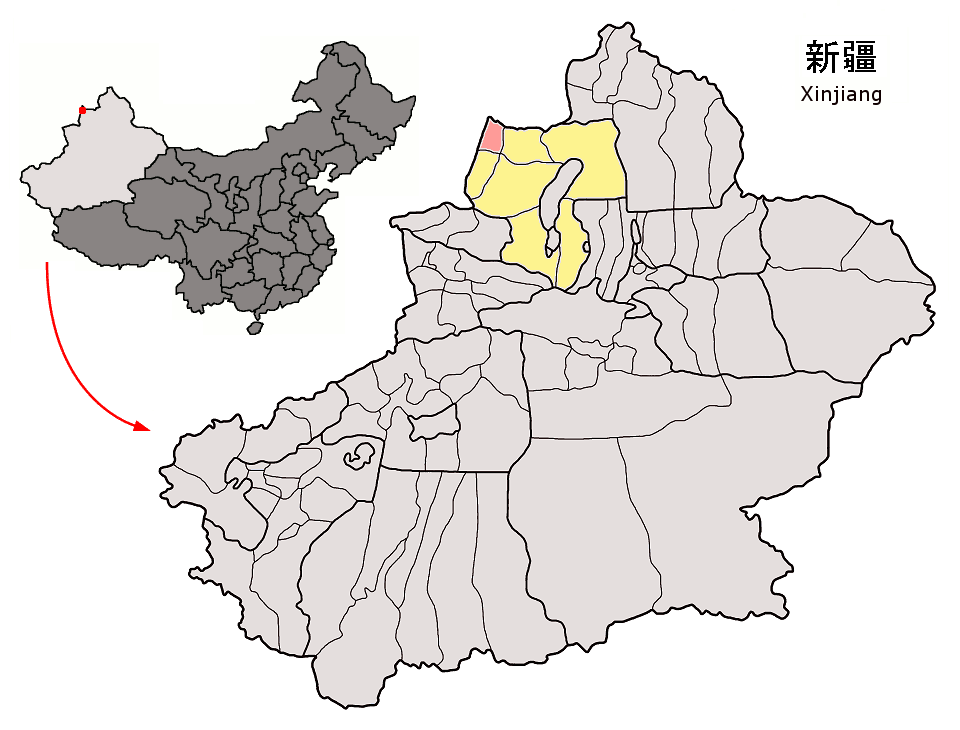
- Location of Tacheng City (pink) in Tacheng Prefecture (yellow) and Xinjiang

- Location of the city centre in Xinjiang Tacheng (Xinjiang) Tacheng (China)
- Coordinates (Tacheng municipal government): 46°45′06″N 82°59′13″E
- Country: China
- Autonomous region: Xinjiang
- Prefecture: Tacheng
- Municipal seat: Heping Subdistrict

Area
  - Total: 3,991.9 km^{2} (1,541.3 sq mi)

Population (2020)
  - Total: 158,098
  - Density: 39.605/km^{2} (102.58/sq mi)
- Time zone: UTC+8 (China Standard (Note: Locals in Xinjiang frequently observe UTC+6 (Xinjiang Time), 2 hours behind Beijing.))
- Postal code: 834700
- Website: www.xjtcsh.gov.cn

Tacheng

Chinese name
- Chinese: 塔城
Transcriptions
Standard Mandarin
- Hanyu Pinyin: Tǎchéng

Alternative Chinese name
- Chinese: 缺切克
Transcriptions
Standard Mandarin
- Hanyu Pinyin: Quēqièkè

Second alternative Chinese name
- Chinese: 楚呼楚
Transcriptions
Standard Mandarin
- Hanyu Pinyin: Chǔhūchǔ

Third alternative Chinese name
- Simplified Chinese: 塔尔巴哈台城
- Traditional Chinese: 塔爾巴哈台城
- Literal meaning: Tarbagatay City
Transcriptions
Standard Mandarin
- Hanyu Pinyin: Tǎ'ěrbāhātái Chéng

Mongolian name
- Mongolian Cyrillic: Тарвагатай
- Mongolian script: ᠲᠠᠷᠪᠠᠭᠠᠲᠠᠢ

Uyghur name
- Uyghur: چۆچەك
Transcriptions
- Latin Yëziqi: Chöchek
- Yengi Yeziⱪ: Qɵqək
- SASM/GNC: Qoqek
- Siril Yëziqi: Чөчәк

Russian name
- Russian: Чугучак

Kazakh name
- Kazakh: شاۋەشەك; Шәуешек; Şäueşek

Daur name
- Daur: Тарбгьти; Tarbgti

Tacheng (Chinese: 塔城), also known as Qoqek (Uyghur: چۆچەك; Kazakh: شاۋەشەك) and historically as Chuguchak (Russian: Чугучак), is a county-level city and the administrative seat of Tacheng Prefecture, in northern Ili Kazakh Autonomous Prefecture, Xinjiang. The Chinese name "Tacheng" is an abbreviation of Tarbagatay City (塔尔巴哈台城), a reference to the Tarbagatay Mountains. Tacheng is located in the Dzungarian Basin, some 10 km (6.2 mi) from the Chinese border with Kazakhstan. For a long time it has been a major center for trade with Central Asia because it is an agricultural hub. Its industries include food processing, textiles, and utilities.

== History ==
In the mid-19th century, Chuguchak was considered the most important commercial center of Western China after Ghulja (Yining), being an important center of trade between China and Russia, in particular in tea. The city, surrounded by an earth wall, was the residence of two Qing ambans and had a garrison of some 1,000 Chinese soldiers and 1,500 Manchu and Mongol soldiers.

Chuguchak suffered harshly in 1865 during the fighting between the Qing forces and the Dungan and Hui rebels.

From March to May 1962, 58,000 Chinese citizens, predominantly ethnic Kazakhs, left Tacheng by crossing the border into the Soviet Union, in what would become known as the Yi–Ta incident. The emigrants were driven by deteriorating living conditions in Xinjiang brought by the Great Leap Forward and false rumours of Soviet citizenship.

Tacheng is the site of an internment camp for Turkic Muslims such as the Uyghurs and Kazakhs; it is one of many such camps in Xinjiang. The Chinese government maintains that they are "vocational education centers" for citizens to learn trade skills and the Chinese language, and that the camp was shut down in 2019. However, satellite imagery shows that the camp expanded five-fold later that year.

== Border crossing ==
The Baktu border crossing (simplified Chinese: 巴克图口岸; traditional Chinese: 巴克圖口岸; pinyin: Bākètú Kǒu'àn) into Kazakhstan is located 17 km (11 mi) from Tacheng. The checkpoint on the Kazakh side of the border is also known as Bakhty and is located 60 km (37 mi) from Makanchi in East Kazakhstan Province. In April 1962, during the Yi–Ta incident, over 60,000 Chinese citizens, including around 48,000 Tacheng residents, crossed the Xinjiang–Kazakh SSR border, leading to massive economic loss in Tacheng; the border crossing closed in August of that year. The crossing re-opened on 20 October 1990, and was deemed a "first-class port of entry" (一类口岸) on 14 March 1994. On 1 July 1995, the crossing opened to use by third nations.

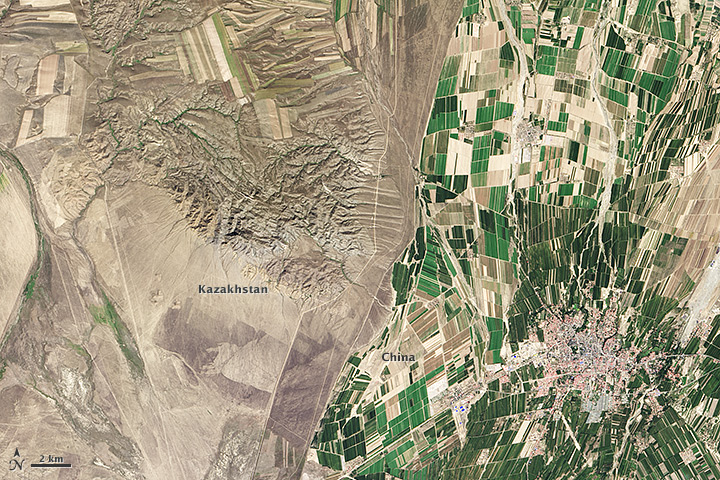
China–Kazakhstan border near Tacheng

== Demographics ==
The proportion of nationalities in Tacheng City
Nationality	Percentage
Han People	60.9%
Kazakhs	16.9%
Hui People	8.5%
Uyghurs	3.1%
Daur people	3.1%
Russian	1.4%
Kyrgyz	1.1%
Mongols	1.0%
Xibe people	0.9%
Tatars	0.1%
Manchus	0.1%
Uzbeks	0.1%
Others	2.7%
Source of the population statistics :

== Administrative divisions ==
Tacheng is divided into 3 subdistricts, 2 towns, 3 townships, and 1 ethnic township,

Name	Simplified Chinese	Hanyu Pinyin	Uyghur (UEY)	Uyghur Latin (ULY)	Kazakh (Arabic script)	Kazakh (Cyrillic script)	Administrative division code
Subdistricts
Heping Subdistrict	和平街道	Hépíng Jiēdào	تېنچىلىق كوچا باشقارمىسى	tënchiliq kocha bashqarmisi	بەيبىت ءمالى باسقارماسى	Бейбіт мәлі басқармасы	654201001
Dubik Subdistrict	杜别克街道	Dùbiékè Jiēdào	دۇبىك كوچا باشقارمىسى	dubik kocha bashqarmisi	دۋبەك ءمالى باسقارماسى	Дубек мәлі басқармасы	654201002
Xincheng Subdistrict	新城街道	Xīnchéng Jiēdào	يېڭى شەھەر كوچا باشقارمىسى	yëngi sheher kocha bashqarmisi	جاڭا قالا ءمالى باسقارماسى	Жаңа қала мәлі басқармасы	654201003
Towns
Ergong Town	二工镇	Èrgōng Zhèn	ئەرگۇڭ بازىرى	Ergung baziri	ارگۇڭ قالاشىعى	Әргүң қалашығы	654201100
Chasha Town	恰夏镇	Qiàxià Zhèn	چاشا بازىرى	chasha baziri	شاشا قالاشىعى	Шаша қалашығы	654201101
Bozdakh Town	博孜达克镇	Bózīdákè Zhèn	بوزداق بازىرى	bozdaq baziri	بوزداق قالاشىعى	Боздақ қалашығы	654201102
Townships
Karakabak Township	喀拉哈巴克乡	Kālāhǎbākè Xiāng	قاراقاباق يېزىسى	qaraqabaq yëzisi	قاراقاباق اۋىلى	Қарақабақ ауылы	654201200
Abdira Township	阿不都拉乡	Ābùdūlā Xiāng	ئابدىرا يېزىسى	Abdira yëzisi	ابدىرا اۋىلى	Абдыра ауылы	654201203
Ëmil Township	也门勒乡	Yěménlè Xiāng	ئېمىل يېزىسى	Ëmil yëzisi	ەمىل اۋىلى	Еміл ауылы	654201204
Ethnic Township
Axili Daur Ethnic Township	阿西尔达斡尔民族乡	Āxī'ěr Dáwò'ěr Mínzúxiāng	ئاشىلى داغۇر يېزىسى	Ashili daghur yëzisi	اشىلى داعۇر ۇلتتىق اۋىلى	Ашылы Дағұр Ұлттық ауылы	654201202

- Others
  - Bozdaq Farm (博孜达克农场, بوزداق دېھقانچىلىق مەيدانى, بوزداق اۋىل شارۋاشىلىعى الاڭىنداعى)
  - Tacheng Prefectural Pasture (塔城地区种牛场, تارباغاتاي ۋىلايەتلىك چارۋىچىلىق مەيدانى, تارباعاتاي ايماقتىق مال شارۋاشىلىعى الاڭىنداعى)
  - Woyijiayilao Pasture (窝依加依劳牧场, ئويجايلاۋ چارۋىچىلىق مەيدانى, ۋيجايلاۋ مال شارۋاشىلىعى الاڭىنداعى)
  - XPCC 164th Regiment (兵团一六四团, 164-تۇەن مەيدانى, 164-تۋان الاڭىنداعى)

== Climate ==
Tacheng has a typical Xinjiang cool semi-arid climate (Köppen BSk) that is almost moist enough to be a hot summer humid continental climate (Köppen Dfa), as being on the west side of the Altay Mountains the region receives more winter snowfall than most of Xinjiang.

Climate data for Tacheng, elevation 535 m (1,755 ft), (1991–2020 normals, extremes 1971–2010)
Month	Jan	Feb	Mar	Apr	May	Jun	Jul	Aug	Sep	Oct	Nov	Dec	Year
Record high °C (°F)	8.6 (47.5)	10.5 (50.9)	24.7 (76.5)	33.2 (91.8)	38.2 (100.8)	37.6 (99.7)	40.3 (104.5)	41.6 (106.9)	37.7 (99.9)	32.0 (89.6)	20.8 (69.4)	11.8 (53.2)	41.6 (106.9)
Mean daily maximum °C (°F)	−4.0 (24.8)	−0.8 (30.6)	7.0 (44.6)	18.2 (64.8)	24.2 (75.6)	29.3 (84.7)	31.1 (88.0)	30.2 (86.4)	24.2 (75.6)	15.8 (60.4)	5.2 (41.4)	−2.1 (28.2)	14.9 (58.8)
Daily mean °C (°F)	−9.9 (14.2)	−6.8 (19.8)	0.9 (33.6)	11.1 (52.0)	16.8 (62.2)	21.7 (71.1)	23.4 (74.1)	22.2 (72.0)	16.3 (61.3)	8.5 (47.3)	−0.3 (31.5)	−7.4 (18.7)	8.0 (46.5)
Mean daily minimum °C (°F)	−14.7 (5.5)	−11.8 (10.8)	−4.0 (24.8)	5.2 (41.4)	10.3 (50.5)	14.9 (58.8)	16.8 (62.2)	15.2 (59.4)	9.5 (49.1)	3.0 (37.4)	−4.5 (23.9)	−11.6 (11.1)	2.4 (36.2)
Record low °C (°F)	−33.5 (−28.3)	−37.1 (−34.8)	−30.6 (−23.1)	−12.3 (9.9)	−3.7 (25.3)	2.6 (36.7)	6.2 (43.2)	4.0 (39.2)	−4.1 (24.6)	−13.3 (8.1)	−31.5 (−24.7)	−34.7 (−30.5)	−37.1 (−34.8)
Average precipitation mm (inches)	21.6 (0.85)	17.3 (0.68)	18.5 (0.73)	28.8 (1.13)	29.1 (1.15)	25.2 (0.99)	28.0 (1.10)	20.5 (0.81)	18.2 (0.72)	23.1 (0.91)	38.0 (1.50)	28.8 (1.13)	297.1 (11.7)
Average precipitation days (≥ 0.1 mm)	9.7	8.2	8.2	7.8	8.2	8.5	9.0	7.1	5.2	6.9	10.1	11.0	99.9
Average snowy days	11.4	11.1	7.3	1.3	0.2	0	0	0	0	2.0	9.1	13.5	55.9
Average relative humidity (%)	70	68	63	51	48	49	51	47	47	57	69	71	58
Mean monthly sunshine hours	151.7	172.4	232.1	263.4	320.2	324.7	331.7	321.3	273.3	219.1	142.7	125.5	2,878.1
Percentage possible sunshine	53	58	62	64	68	69	70	75	74	67	52	47	63
Source 1: China Meteorological Administration
Source 2: Weather China

== Transportation ==
The Karamay–Tacheng Railway (opened on May 30, 2019) connects Tacheng with Baikouquan Station (百口泉站) on the Kuytun–Beitun Railway in Karamay City. It takes 9 hours from Tacheng to Ürümqi.

Tacheng is also served by the Tacheng Qianquan Airport with flights to Ürümqi and other cities in Xinjiang.

== Gallery ==
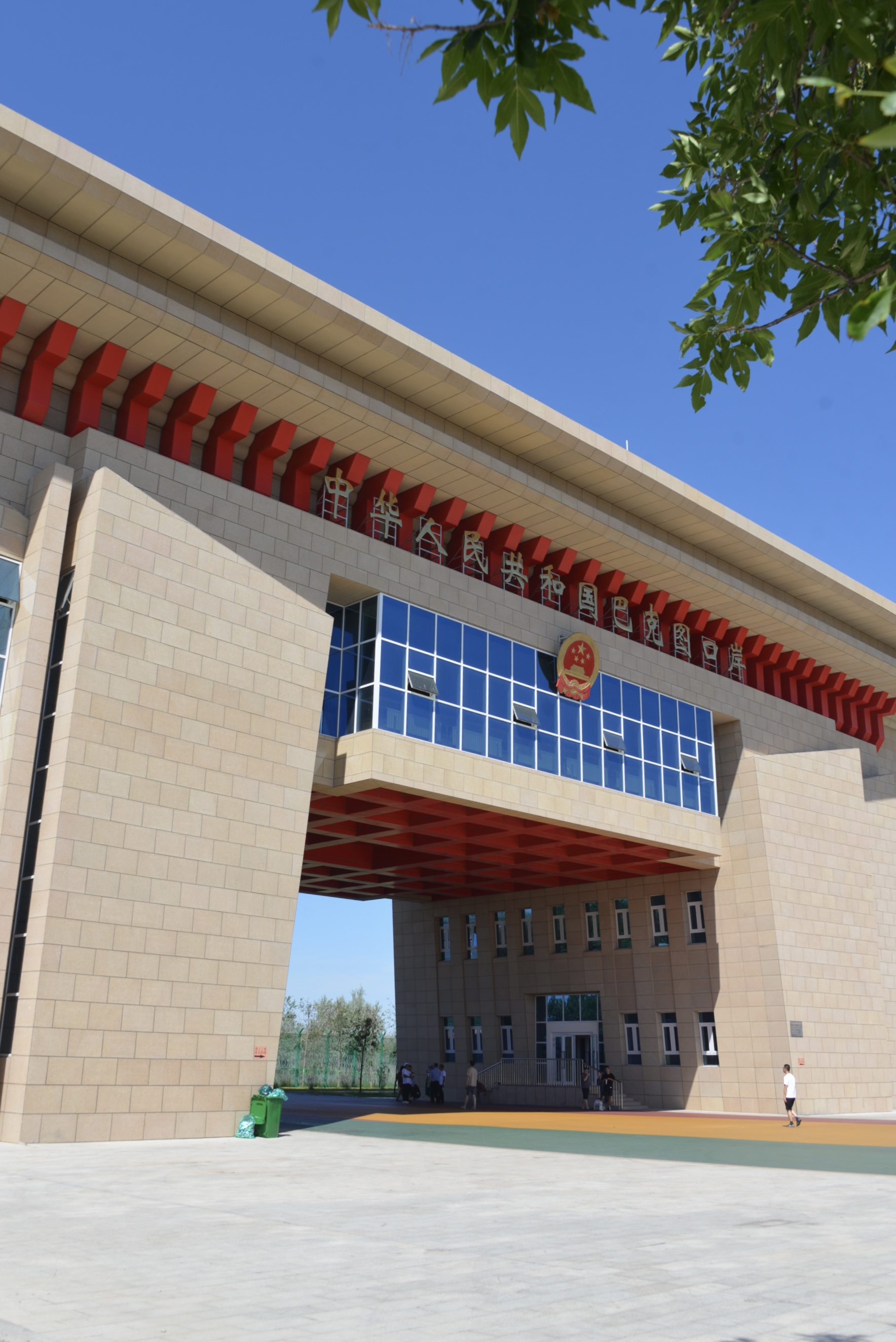
Baktu Port of Entry

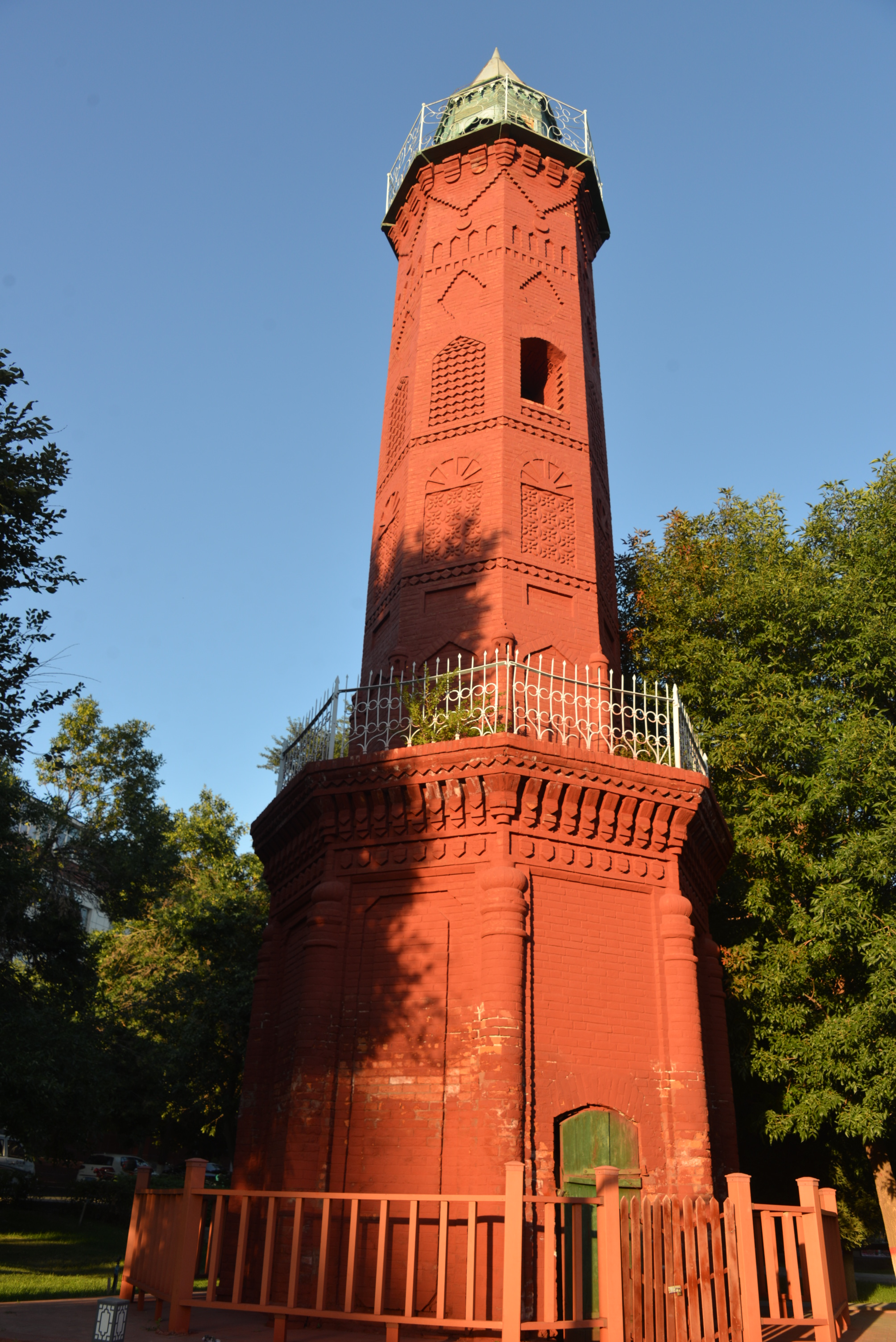
Minaret of the Khanaka Mosque

== Notable people ==
- Li Jingliang (born 1988), Chinese mixed martial artist, currently competes in the welterweight in the Ultimate Fighting Championship.
- Zhang Yangyang (born 1991), Chinese pop singer.
