= Wu Zhong =

Major General in the People's Liberation Army (1921–1990)

- Native name: 吴忠
- Born: Wu Guangzhu (吴光珠); 21 October 1921; Cangxi County, Sichuan, Republic of China
- Died: 26 February 1990 (aged 68) Hainan, People's Republic of China
- Allegiance: Chinese Communist Party; People's Republic of China
- Branch: People's Liberation Army Ground Force
- Service years: 1933–1988
- Rank: Major General
- Commands: PLA Beijing Garrison
- Conflicts: Chinese Civil War; Second Sino-Japanese War; Korean War; Sino-Vietnamese War
- Awards: Order of Bayi (Third class); Order of Independence and Freedom (Second class); Order of Liberation (Second class); Red Star Meritorious Medal (First class)

Wu Zhong (Chinese: 吴忠; pinyin: Wú Zhōng; 21 October 1921 – 26 February 1990) was a major general in the Chinese People's Liberation Army (PLA).

== Life and career ==
Wu Zhong was born on 21 October 1921 in Cangxi County, Sichuan, with his ancestral home in Jiangxi. At the age of seven, he began attending a private school, completing six years of education. In 1933, Wu joined the Chinese Workers' and Peasants' Red Army. By 1935, he had joined both the Communist Youth League of China and the Chinese Communist Party. He served as a cadre in the political office of the 268th Regiment in the 90th Division of the 30th Red Army, participating in the Long March.

During the Second Sino-Japanese War, Wu held several positions, including platoon leader and deputy company commander in the Special Service Regiment of the Eighth Route Army Headquarters. Later, he became a guerrilla brigade commander and held key roles in Western Shanxi and Shandong. In 1945, he was appointed commander of the 5th Regiment in the 8th sub-district of the Hebei-Shandong-Henan Military Region. Following the end of World War II and during the Chinese Civil War, Wu commanded various units and participated in key campaigns such as the Huaihai Campaign, Yangtze River Crossing Campaign, Shanghai Campaign, and the Southwest Campaign. In February 1949, he became commander of the 52nd Division in the 18th Army of the Second Field Army.

Following the founding of the People's Republic of China, Wu served as a division commander. During the Korean War, he commanded the 31st Division of the 12th Army under the People's Volunteer Army, participating in engagements like the Battle of Triangle Hill. Following his return to China in 1954, he served in variety of positions, including as commander of a mechanized division. In 1955, at the age of 34, Wu was awarded the rank of major general, making him one of the youngest generals in the People's Liberation Army. Originally, the youngest general was Margub Iskhakov, a 32-year-old PLA general of Chinese Tatar descent. However, after Iskhakov immigrated to the Soviet Union during the Yi–Ta incident in 1962, the title was stripped from his official records. As a result, Wu was retroactively recognized as the youngest general in PLA's historiography.

From 1968, Wu served as the first deputy commander of the PLA Beijing Garrison and became its commander in 1970. In 1976, he played a pivotal role in suppressing the Gang of Four, contributing to the end of the Cultural Revolution. From 1977 to 1980, as deputy commander of the Guangzhou Military Region. During this time, he played role in preparing for the Sino-Vietnamese War of 1979. He was tasked with overseeing military preparations in Guangxi and held unified command over the Southern Group troops of the military region. Wu took on significant responsibilities, including planning and executing major assault operations during the conflict.

During the war, he was accused of being linked to former counter-revolutionary groups of Lin Biao and the Gang of Four. Additionally, his involvement in suppressing protests during the 1976 Tiananmen Incident was cited as a basis for these allegations. These accusations led the Central Military Commission to launch an investigation against him. Wu was removed from his position as deputy commander of the Guangzhou Military Region and ordered to report to Beijing for questioning. Despite the orders, Wu did not comply immediately and continued participating in military operations during the Sino-Vietnamese War. His defiance added to the political challenges he faced, and he endured eight years of investigation. It was only on 18 June 1987 that the Beijing Military Region Party Committee, with approval from the Central Military Commission, formally cleared him of all charges. The investigation concluded that Wu had no ties to counter-revolutionary groups and that the accusations against him were unfounded.

In 1988, Wu resigned from the military with the approval of the Central Military Commission. After retiring, Wu wrote memoirs and articles about Marshal of the People's Republic of China Liu Bocheng. Wu died in a car accident while traveling from Sanya to Haikou in Hainan on 26 February 1990, at the age of 68.

== Awards and decorations ==
His decorations include:

- Order of Bayi (Third class)
- Order of Independence and Freedom (Second class)
- Order of Liberation (Second class)
- Red Star Meritorious Medal (First class)
