= Yi–Ta incident =

1962 mass exodus of people from China to the Soviet Union

- Part of the Xinjiang conflict
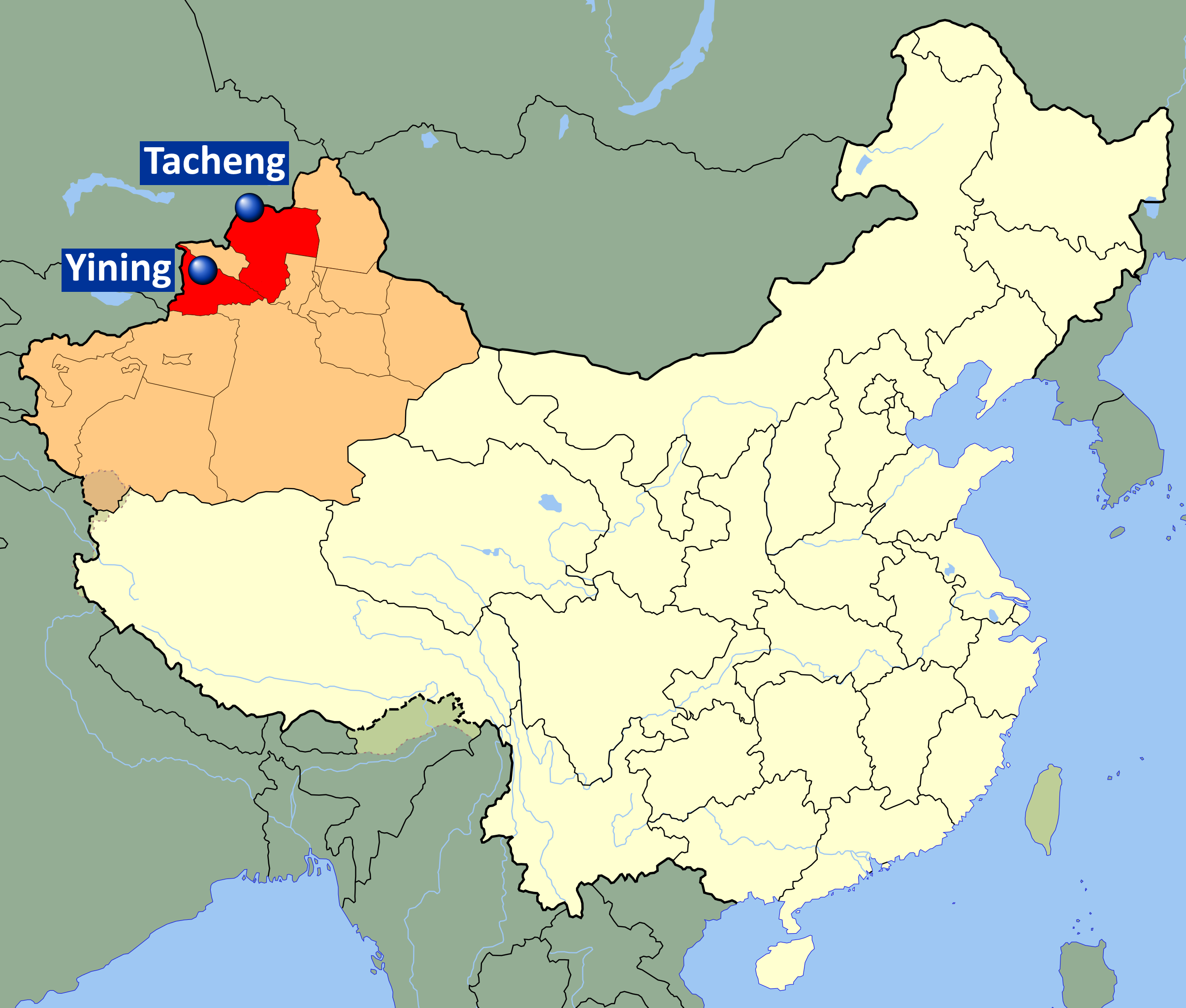
- Map of China with the prefectures of Ili and Tacheng highlighted in red, and their capitals Yining and Tacheng pinpointed
- Date: March – May 1962
- Location: Ili Kazakh Autonomous Prefecture and Tacheng Prefecture, in Xinjiang, China
- Caused by: Shortages of basic necessities in Xinjiang; Anti-Chinese sentiment amid an influx of Han Chinese migrants to Xinjiang; Uncertainty regarding the Sino–Soviet split
- Result: Migration of at least 60,000 Chinese citizens to the Soviet Union; Closure of the Sino–Soviet border until 1983; Closure of Soviet consulates and businesses in Xinjiang

Parties
| Chinese citizens, predominantly ethnic Kazakhs | Government of China: Chinese Communist Party; People's Police; Xinjiang Production and Construction Corps |

Number
| 2,000 protesters in Yining | |

Casualties and losses
| 5 killed 12 wounded | |

The Yi–Ta incident (Chinese: 伊塔事件) was a mass exodus of people from China to the Soviet Union in early 1962. At least 60,000 Chinese citizens migrated to the Soviet Union by crossing the border between the Xinjiang Uyghur Autonomous Region and the Kazakh Soviet Socialist Republic from March to May 1962. The migrants were predominantly ethnic Kazakhs, but many Kyrgyz, Tatars, Uyghurs, and Uzbeks also left, driven by deteriorating living conditions in Xinjiang, the Chinese government's perceived bias towards the Han Chinese, and claims of Soviet citizenship being granted to migrants of "Soviet nationalities". The exodus occurred amid a climate of panic and uncertainty surrounding the Sino–Soviet split, with rumours spreading among Xinjiang's populace that, among other things, the Sino–Soviet border would soon be closed and a war would erupt between the two countries. The exodus ended when the Chinese authorities pressured their Soviet counterparts to close the border, prompting protests in Yining, the then de facto political and economic centre of Xinjiang.

The exodus came to be known as the "Yi–Ta incident" because it took place in Ili (Yili) Kazakh Autonomous Prefecture and Tacheng Prefecture. The Chinese government describes the protests in Yining, which turned violent, as the "29 May counter-revolutionary riots" (Chinese: 5·29反革命暴乱事件).

== Etymology ==
Yi–Ta incident
- Chinese: 伊塔事件
Transcriptions
Standard Mandarin
- Hanyu Pinyin: Yī-Tǎ shìjiàn

29 May counter-revolutionary riots
- Simplified Chinese: 5·29反革命暴乱事件
- Traditional Chinese: 5·29反革命暴亂事件
Transcriptions
Standard Mandarin
- Hanyu Pinyin: wǔ-èr-jiǔ fǎngémìng bàoluàn shìjiàn

The abbreviation "Yi–Ta" (伊塔) is derived from the Chinese names of the two prefectures where the exodus took place, Yili (伊犁州) and Tacheng (塔城地区). Yi–Ta may also refer to each prefecture's capital, Yining (伊宁市) and Tacheng (塔城市), respectively. Some scholars use the abbreviation "I–Ta", derived from the prefectures' Turkic names, Ili and Tarbagatay.

== Background ==
During the latter half of the 19th century, the Russian Empire sought to extend its influence to Xinjiang (Sinkiang), particularly the Ili region, to facilitate cross-border trade and create a buffer zone between Russia and China. By the mid-19th century, Russia had conquered most of Central Asia, up to the present-day border between Kazakhstan and China. In 1865, Oirat rebel armies of the Dungan Revolt in Xinjiang began intruding into Russian-occupied parts of the Tarbagatay Mountains, attacking locals and disrupting cross-border trade. Taranchi rebels meanwhile declared a sultanate in the Ili region and began intruding into Russian territory in 1867. Adding to Russia's concerns was the rise of Yakub Beg and his regime centered around Kashgar, which threatened to expand northward into the Ili region. These worries culminated in Russia invading the Ili region in 1871, ostensibly to protect Russian subjects living in its borderlands. Russia agreed to withdraw from the Ili region following the 1881 Treaty of Saint Petersburg, or Treaty of Ili, which delineated most of the border between Russian Turkestan and Xinjiang. By 1883, Russia had fully withdrawn its occupying forces but continued to exert influence over the region.

The Soviet Union, in continuation of its predecessor's ambitions, attempted to maintain influence in Xinjiang by backing the Soviet-friendly regime of Chinese warlord Sheng Shicai from 1934 to 1942, and the Second East Turkestan Republic (ETR) from 1944 to 1945. Many progressives within the ETR leadership were Soviet-educated children of Turkic émigrés to Xinjiang. The Soviets withdrew their support for the ETR following negotiations with the Kuomintang-led government of the Republic of China (ROC) in 1945. The ETR and ROC subsequently formed a coalition government at the encouragement of the Soviets. However, the coalition government collapsed in 1947, and the Soviet leadership began revising their internal policy towards Xinjiang when it became more certain that the region would eventually be taken over by the Chinese communists and their People's Liberation Army (PLA).

The Chinese communists' proclamation of the People's Republic of China and takeover of Xinjiang in 1949 marked the beginning of a new era of Sino–Soviet policy in the region. The Russian revolutions of 1917 had prompted tens-of-thousands of Turkic Muslims living in the Russian borderlands to flee to Xinjiang. Many of these émigrés became stateless, as they did not return home to obtain Soviet citizenship and did not apply for Chinese citizenship. Consequently, their descendants were by and large stateless as well. In 1962, Chinese officials in Ili Prefecture estimated that 60 per cent of the prefecture's 900,000 residents were stateless. Ili Prefecture also had a large population of Soviet citizens – migrants or descendants of migrants who arrived through unpatrolled borders during the Chinese Civil War. In a show of "socialist fraternity", the Chinese government allowed Soviet citizens and Soviet-origin stateless peoples to freely return to the Soviet Union during the Soviets' Virgin Lands campaign. From 1954 to 1963, 186,295 people were repatriated from Ili Prefecture to the Soviet Union. A further 5,620 people were repatriated from Tacheng Prefecture.

== Causes ==
=== Shortages of basic necessities ===
To achieve the goals of the Great Leap Forward, the Chinese government began limiting cross-border trade in Xinjiang in 1961. By 1960, goods such as grain, sugar, tea, cloth, and boots were in short supply. Although locals in Ili Prefecture and Tacheng Prefecture relied on cross-border trade with the Soviet Union for such necessities, the Chinese leadership in Beijing issued a directive for local cadres to prioritise industrial materials for the Great Leap Forward instead. Deteriorating Sino–Soviet relations and the spread of the Great Chinese Famine to Xinjiang prompted the Chinese government to further restrict cross-border trade to limit the spending of foreign exchange. The Chinese government completely halted imports of what it considered "non-emergency goods", which included basic necessities like food and clothing. The import volume to Xinjiang from the Soviet Union was 148,665 Soviet rubles in 1961, almost half of what it was in 1960. The import percentage of "non-emergency goods" also dropped from 52 per cent in 1960 to 0 per cent in 1961.

In response to the shortages, many residents of Ili Prefecture and Tacheng Prefecture began asking relatives in the Soviet Union to mail them food and clothing. In 1961, the number of parcels being sent from the Soviet Union to Tacheng Prefecture ballooned to 1,777. In the early months of 1962, a total of 2,519 parcels were sent from the Soviet Union to Ili Prefecture and 562 to Tacheng Prefecture. The Chinese government pointed to the parcels as evidence of a plot by "Soviet revisionists" to entice locals into leaving Xinjiang.

=== Anti-Chinese sentiment ===
The movement of tens-of-thousands of Uyghurs between Xinjiang and Soviet Central Asia in the 1920s and 1930s produced an unprecedented number of Uyghur intellectuals, many of whom developed views against Chinese rule. Many had studied Soviet-style autonomy and pointed to the Soviet republics in Central Asia as examples of Turkic peoples being governed by their own leaders. The establishment of the ETR in the three districts of Ili, Tacheng, and Altay in 1944 was a culmination of the desires to emulate Soviet Central Asia in Xinjiang and to form an independent state governed by the region's Turkic majority.

Despite official narratives, the takeover of Xinjiang by the Chinese communists in 1949 did not repair the relationship between the Chinese central government and the Turkic peoples of Xinjiang, which was marred by distrust. The Chinese government sought to stamp out "separatist tendencies" and "local nationalism" among the populace in the areas formerly governed by the ETR. Chinese authorities were fearful that a separatist movement in Xinjiang could serve as a tool of Soviet subversion amid worsening Sino–Soviet relations. From August 1957 to March 1960, an "Anti-Rightist Campaign" was waged in Xinjiang. Hundreds of non–Han Chinese officials were removed from their positions in the local government, denounced, and imprisoned. The Chinese government then replaced them with Han Chinese officials and recruited 800,000 Han Chinese youth from the country's east to aid the new leaders in "socialist construction". The rapid disappearance of ethnic minorities in the local governments of Xinjiang intensified anti-Chinese and pro-Soviet sentiments among the non–Han Chinese populace.

The influx of Han Chinese migrants to Xinjiang in general also exacerbated ethnic tensions. In Ili Prefecture, from 1949 to 1959, the Kazakh and Uyghur populations grew by 18 and 39 per cent, respectively, while the Han Chinese population increased nearly ten-fold, from 38,099 to 365,250 people. A local ethnic Kazakh cadre of the Chinese Communist Party was recorded as having said: "[Ili] is not a Kazakh autonomous prefecture. It is a [Han] Chinese autonomous prefecture."

=== Sino–Soviet split ===
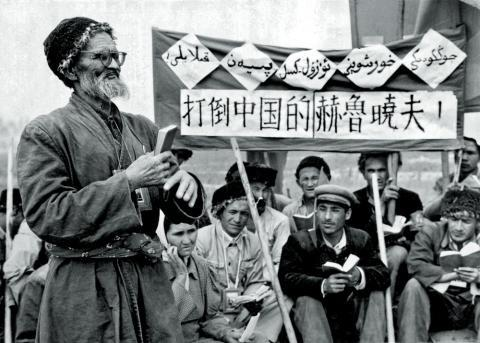
Uyghur communists hold a banner which reads "Down with China's Khrushchev!" (a reference to Liu Shaoqi) in Uyghur and Chinese.

Amid the Soviet Union's Virgin Lands campaign and China's Great Leap Forward, both countries began competing for the labour force in Xinjiang, particularly the large population of stateless peoples of Soviet origin. Before the Sino–Soviet split, the Soviet government's official position reflected that of the Chinese government, that the stateless peoples of Xinjiang were "Chinese". However, when relations started to deteriorate in 1960, the Soviet government began demanding the repatriation of "Soviet nationals". The Chinese government responded by recognising the stateless peoples as "Chinese citizens" and issuing them Chinese passports. Legal processes for migration to the Soviet Union were delayed, and applicants were removed from their schools or jobs without explanation, as a warning to others who would consider leaving Xinjiang.

The poor state of Sino–Soviet relations came to light during the 22nd Congress of the Communist Party of the Soviet Union held in Moscow in October 1961. Soviet premier Nikita Khrushchev delivered a searing criticism of the pro-Chinese Party of Labour of Albania. Chinese premier Zhou Enlai, who was invited to the congress as a delegate from the Chinese Communist Party, deduced that the criticism was actually aimed at him and his party. Zhou consequently condemned Khrushchev and left the congress in protest, worsening and publicising the already strained relations between China and the Soviet Union. The public revelation led to fears in Xinjiang that the Sino–Soviet border would soon be closed and a war between the two countries was imminent.

=== Rumours of Soviet citizenship ===
As the Chinese government tightened its migration policies, rumours began to spread in Xinjiang about who the Soviets would accept as citizens. One rumour claimed that the Soviets stated, "All Kazakhs, Uzbeks, and Tatars are Soviet citizens, and all should return to the Soviet Union." Another asserted that an invitation had been made to the people of Tacheng Prefecture: "Most people in Tacheng [Prefecture] are originally from the Soviet Union. Even today, the Soviet government regards them as Soviet citizens. The door of the Soviet Union is still open for them." The rumours gradually evolved, and the claims as to who the Soviets would welcome became more wide-encompassing. The rumour became that anyone with Soviet identification could cross the border and become a Soviet citizen. It then became anyone who claimed to have arrived in Xinjiang from the Soviet Union, regardless of what documentation they possessed.

With the existing rumours "solving" the problem of legal migration and citizenship, the focus of the tall tales shifted to how one would cross the border. Locals in Ili Prefecture and Tacheng Prefecture began claiming to each other that "the Soviets [had] opened the border" and would "send buses to pick [them] up". Rumours further claimed that the Soviets had instructed locals to bring their entire families: "When you come, do not come alone. Bring your relatives and friends with you. If you come, we will give you money and houses. We will let you learn to drive buses. We will reward you." These false claims of Soviet hospitality encouraged many locals in Xinjiang to migrate to the Soviet Union as soon as possible.

== Exodus and protests ==
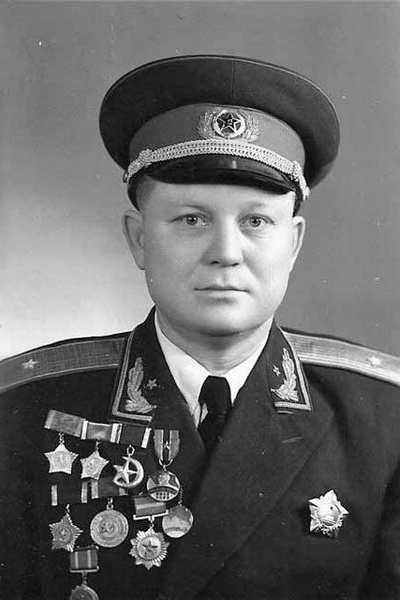
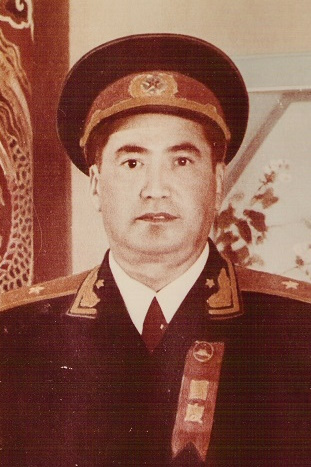
PLA major generals Margub Iskhakov (left) and Zunun Taipov (right) were among those who left.

In early 1962, the Soviet authorities changed their border policy and began accepting the entry of "unofficial" migrants rather than deporting them back to China. From March to May 1962, 60,000 to 67,000 Chinese citizens, mostly ethnic Kazakhs who had only recently obtained Chinese citizenship, migrated to the Soviet Union by crossing the border from Xinjiang to Soviet Kazakhstan. Many Kyrgyz, Tatars, Uyghurs, and Uzbeks also left. The Ili prefectural government estimated that 14,000 of its residents had left through the border city of Korgas, while the Tacheng prefectural government meanwhile estimated that up to 58,000 of its residents had left through the prefectural capital Tacheng, another border city. Several cooperative farms in the region were consequently left empty of workers. Major Generals Margub Iskhakov and Zunun Taipov of the People's Liberation Army (PLA), both Tatars, were the most prominent figures among those who migrated.

Under pressure from the Chinese government, the Soviet authorities reversed their decision and sealed off their side of the border, prompting protests in Ili Prefecture. On 29 May 1962, 2,000 protesters demonstrated in Yining, the prefectural capital, demanding that Chinese authorities allow them to migrate to the Soviet Union. They shouted several slogans, including: "Let us go to the Soviet Union!", "Abolish grain rationing!", "The Han Chinese have been suppressing us for twelve years!", and "Down with the Chinese Communist Party, eradicate the Han Chinese, release the political dissidents!" A group of protesters manage to break into and occupy the offices of the prefectural government, while other protesters attempted to seize the neighbouring prefectural headquarters of the Chinese Communist Party. The Central Committee of the Chinese Communist Party immediately authorised the use of force to disperse the protesters. The 4th Agricultural Division of the Xinjiang Production and Construction Corps (or Bingtuan), a government paramilitary organisation, was mobilised to assist local police. The unrest ended when government troops opened fire at the protesters, killing five and seriously wounding twelve.

== Aftermath ==
Then paramount leader of China Mao Zedong described the Yi–Ta incident as a "conspiracy" by "Soviet revisionists" and called on the country to "be prepared for war", although war never came. In June 1962, the Chinese government closed all Soviet consulates in Xinjiang, and by August all Soviet businesses in the region had been shutdown as well. The Sino–Soviet border was closed indefinitely, and it would not open again until 1983.

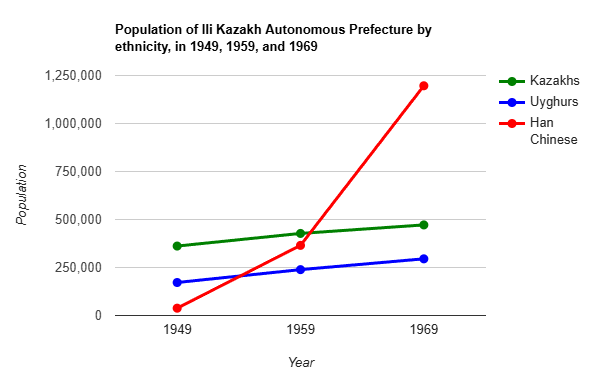
Population of Ili Kazakh Autonomous Prefecture by ethnicity, in 1949, 1959, and 1969

The Han Chinese population in northern Xinjiang continued to grow exponentially after the Yi–Ta incident. To further secure the border and compensate for the loss in manpower brought about by the exodus, thousands of Bingtuan soldiers were relocated to northern Xinjiang from the region's interior. The Chinese government also encouraged the migration of hundreds of thousands of Han Chinese youth from major cities such as Beijing, Shanghai, and Tianjin. By 1969 the number of Han Chinese in Ili Prefecture had reached 1.2 million, outnumbering the number of Kazakhs and Uyghurs combined.

Yining lost its status as Xinjiang's de facto political and economic center, as after the protests the Chinese government moved its administrative buildings and industrial focus to Ürümqi. The Chinese government also began construction on a railway connecting Ürümqi to China proper in the east. As a result, Xinjiang was culturally and economically reoriented away from Central Asia and towards China proper.
