= Margub Iskhakov =

Chinese Tatar military officer (1923–1992)

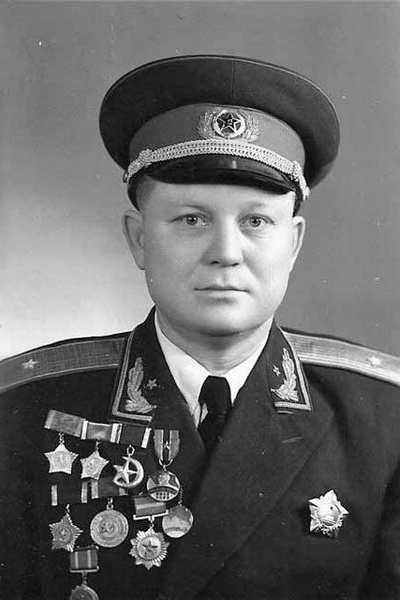
- Born: Margub Timergali uli Iskhakov; 13 March 1923; Ghulja, Xinjiang Province, Republic of China
- Died: 1992 (aged 68–69); Alma-Ata, Kazakhstan
- Relatives: Asgat Iskhakov (brother)
- Military career
- Allegiance: East Turkestan Republic (1944–1946); People's Republic of China (1949–1961)
- Branch: East Turkestan National Army (1945–1949); People's Liberation Army (1949–1961)
- Rank: Major General of the PLA
- Commands: PLA Fifth Army (1949–1954); Ili Military Region (1954–1960); Xinjiang Military Region (1960–1961)
- Conflicts: Ili Rebellion (1944–1946)

Chinese name
- Traditional Chinese: 馬爾果甫·伊斯卡果夫
- Simplified Chinese: 马尔果夫·伊斯哈科夫
Transcriptions
Standard Mandarin
- Hanyu Pinyin: Mǎ'ěrguǒfǔ Yīsīkǎguǒfū

Russian name
- Russian: Маргуб Тимергалиевич Исхаков

Tatar name
- Tatar: Мәргуб Тимергали улы Исхаков; Märgub Timergali ulı İsxaqov

Margub Timergali uli Iskhakov (Note: Tatar: Мәргуб Тимергали улы Исхаков; also Margub Timergalievich Iskhakov, from Russian: Маргуб Тимергалиевич Исхаков) (13 March 1923 – 1992) was a Chinese Tatar military officer who held several important commands in the armies of the Second East Turkestan Republic and the People's Republic of China. He defected to the Soviet Union in the 1962 Yi–Ta incident, amid the Sino-Soviet split. He died in Alma-Ata (Almaty), Kazakhstan, in 1992.

== Biography ==
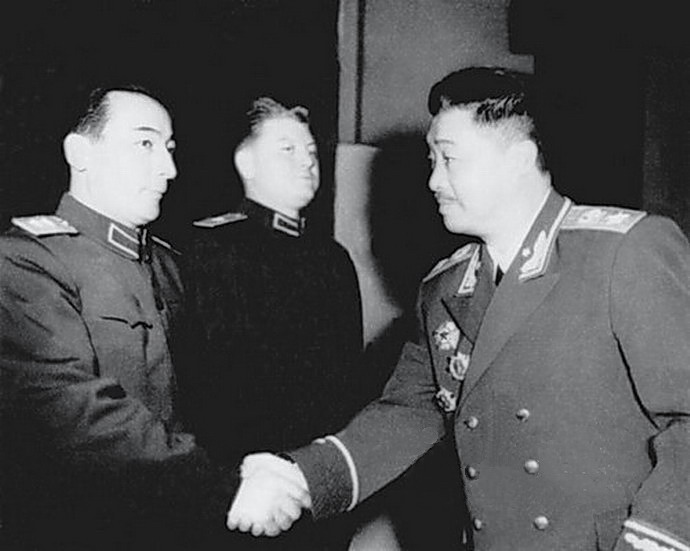
Iskhakov (center) standing beside Seypidin Azizi, 1955

Iskhakov was born to an ethnic Tatar, Muslim family in the Chinese city of Ghulja in 1923. A communist, Iskhakov was imprisoned for two years under the regime of Sheng Shicai, after which he joined the Ili Rebellion as a political commissar. In 1945, he was appointed Chief of Staff of the Ili National Army of the Second East Turkestan Republic. Following the Incorporation of Xinjiang into the People's Republic of China in 1949, Iskhakov joined the Chinese Communist Party and accepted a commission in the People's Liberation Army (PLA). He was eventually appointed Chief of Staff of the Xinjiang Military Region and in 1955 became the youngest general in the PLA.

In 1956, the Sino-Soviet Split began, and during this period of political dispute many Tatars and ethnic Muslims in Xinjiang, including Iskhakov, sided with the Soviet Union and were granted Soviet citizenship. However, Iskhakov's relocation to the Soviet Union was handled legally and with few political consequences, resulting in his peaceful immigration to the Kazakh Soviet Socialist Republic in 1962. Following his immigration to the Soviet Union, the PLA removed the title of youngest general from Iskhakov and retroactively awarded it to Major General Wu Zhong.
