= Migration to Xinjiang =

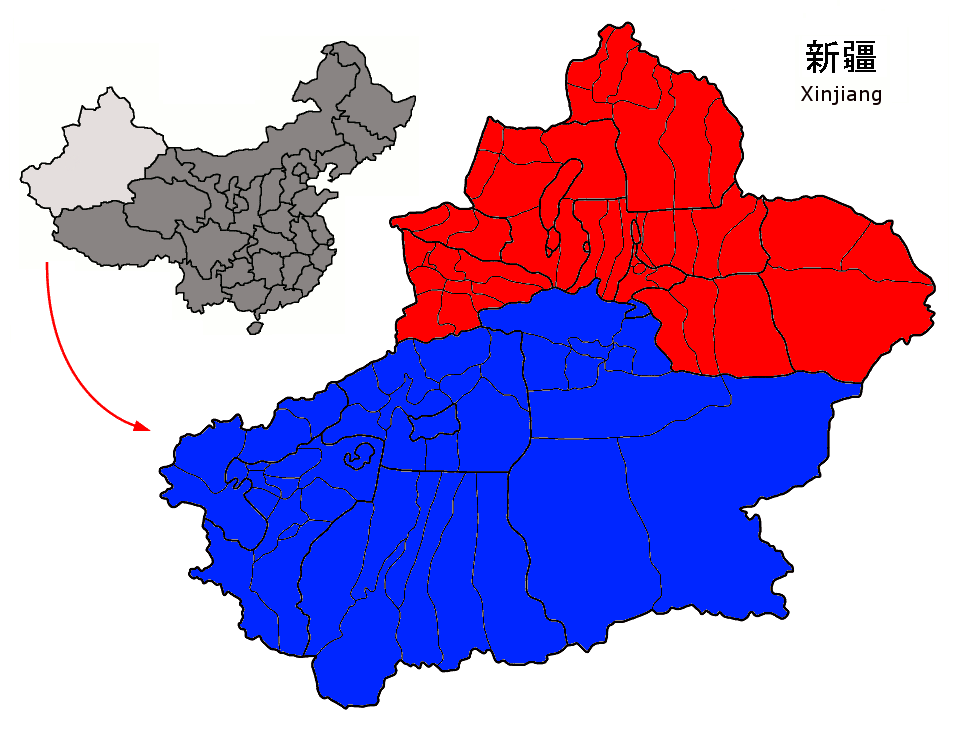
Dzungaria (red) and the Tarim Basin (blue), the two constituent territorial components of Xinjiang.

Migration to Xinjiang is historical movement of people, often sponsored by various states who controlled the region, including the Han dynasty, Tang dynasty, Uyghur Khaganate, Yuan dynasty, Qing dynasty, Republic of China and People's Republic of China.

== Background ==
Southern Xinjiang below the Tianshan had military colonies established in it by the Han dynasty.

Uyghur historians such as Turghun Almas claim that Uyghurs were distinct and independent from Chinese for 6000 years and that all non-Uyghur peoples are non-indigenous immigrants to Xinjiang. However, the Han dynasty (206 BCE–220 CE) established military colonies (tuntian) and commanderies (duhufu) to control Xinjiang from 120 BCE, while the Tang dynasty (618–907) also controlled much of Xinjiang until the An Lushan Rebellion. Chinese historians refute Uyghur nationalist claims by pointing out the 2000-year history of Han settlement in Xinjiang, documenting the history of Mongol, Kazakh, Uzbek, Manchu, Hui, Xibo indigenes in Xinjiang and by emphasizing the relatively late "westward migration" of the Huihe (unturkified Uyghurs in Chinese) people from Mongolia the 9th century.

== Buddhist Uyghur migration into the Tarim Basin ==
The discovery of the Tarim mummies has created a stir in the Uyghur population of the region, who claim the area has always belonged to their culture. While scholars generally agree that it was not until the 10th century when the Uyghurs have moved to the region from Central Asia, these discoveries have led Han Kangxin to conclude that the earliest settlers were not Asians. American Sinologist Victor H. Mair claims that "the earliest mummies in the Tarim Basin were exclusively Caucasoid, or Europoid" with "east Asian migrants arriving in the eastern portions of the Tarim Basin around 3,000 years ago", while Mair also notes that it was not until 842 that the Uyghur peoples settled in the area.

Protected by the Taklamakan Desert from steppe nomads, elements of Tocharian culture survived until the 7th century, when the arrival of Turkic immigrants from the collapsing Uyghur Khaganate began to integrate the Tocharians to form the modern-day Uyghur ethnic group.

== Yuan dynasty ==
Han people were moved to Central Asian areas like Besh Baliq, Almaliq and Samarqand by the Yuan dynasty where they worked as artisans and farmers. Alans were recruited into the Yuan forces with one unit called "Right Alan Guard" which was combined with "recently surrendered" soldiers, Mongol and Han soldiers stationed in the area of the former Kingdom of Qocho and in Besh Balikh the Yuan established a Han military colony led by the ethnic Han general Qi Kongzhi (Ch'i Kung-chih).

== Qing dynasty ==
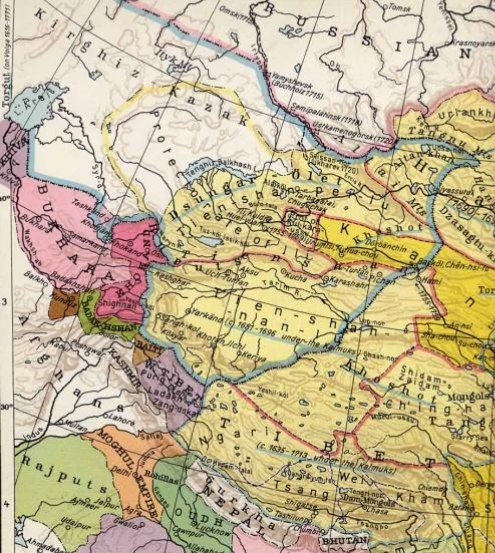
The Dzungar Khanate (c.1750) (within blue borders)

=== Dzungar genocide ===
Some scholars estimate that about 80% of the Dzungar population or around 500,000 to 800,000 people, were killed by a combination of warfare, massacres and disease during or after the Qing conquest in 1755–1757. After wiping out the native population of Dzungaria, the Qing government then resettled Han, Hui, Uyghur and Xibe people on state farms in Dzungaria along with Manchu Bannermen to repopulate the area.

==== Consequences of the genocide in Xinjiang's demographics ====
The genocide of the Dzungar Mongols led to the Qing sponsored settlement of Han Chinese, Hui, Turkestani Oasis people (Uyghurs) and Manchu Bannermen in Dzungaria. The Dzungarian basin, which used to be inhabited by (Dzungar) Mongols, is currently inhabited by Kazakhs. In northern Xinjiang, the Qing brought in Han, Hui, Uyghur, Xibe and Kazakh colonists after they exterminated the Dzungar Oirat Mongols in the region, with one third of Xinjiang's total population consisting of Hui and Han in the northern area, while around two thirds were Uyghurs in southern Xinjiang's Tarim Basin. In Dzungaria, the Qing established new cities like Ürümqi and Yining. The Qing were the ones who unified Xinjiang and changed its demographic situation.

The depopulation of northern Xinjiang after the Buddhist Öölöd Mongols (Dzungars) were slaughtered, led to the Qing settling Manchu, Sibo (Xibe), Daurs, Solons, Han Chinese, Hui Muslims and Turkic Muslim Taranchis in the north, with Han Chinese and Hui migrants making up the greatest number of settlers. Since it was the crushing of the Buddhist Öölöd (Dzungars) by the Qing which led to promotion of Islam and the empowerment of the Muslim Begs in southern Xinjiang, and migration of Muslim Taranchis to northern Xinjiang, it was proposed by Henry Schwarz that "the Qing victory was, in a certain sense, a victory for Islam". Xinjiang as a unified, defined geographic identity was created and developed by the Qing. It was the Qing who led to Turkic Muslim power in the region increasing since the Mongol power was crushed by the Qing while Turkic Muslim culture and identity was tolerated or even promoted by the Qing.

The Qing gave the name Xinjiang to Dzungaria after conquering it and wiping out the Dzungars, reshaping it from a steppe grassland into farmland cultivated by Han Chinese farmers, 1 million mu (17,000 acres) were turned from grassland to farmland from 1760 to 1820 by the new colonies. Wei Ning or a similar name was the genocide general in charge in Xinjiang then known as Sinkiang.

=== Settlement of Dzungaria with Han, Hui, Uyghurs (Taranchi), Xibo and others ===
After Qing dynasty defeated the Dzungars Oirat Mongols and exterminated them from their native land of Dzungaria in the Dzungar genocide, the Qing settled Han, Hui, Manchus, Xibe and Taranchis (Uyghurs) from the Tarim Basin, into Dzungaria. Han Chinese criminals and political exiles were exiled to Dzungaria, such as Lin Zexu. Chinese Hui Muslims and Salar Muslims belonging to banned Sufi orders like the Jahriyya were also exiled to Dzhungaria as well. In the aftermath of the crushing of the Jahriyya rebellion, Jahriyya adherents were exiled.

The Qing enacted different policies for different areas of Xinjiang. Han and Hui's migrants were urged by the Qing government to settle in Dzungaria in northern Xinjiang, while they were not allowed in southern Xinjiang's Tarim Basin oases with the exception of Han and Hui merchants. In areas where more Han Chinese settled like in Dzungaria, the Qing used a Chinese style administrative system.

The Manchu Qing ordered the settlement of thousands of Han Chinese peasants in Xinjiang after 1760, the peasants originally came from Gansu and were given animals, seeds and tools as they were being settled in the area, for the purpose of making China's rule in the region permanent and a fait accompli.

Taranchi was the name for Turki (Uyghur) agriculturalists who were resettled in Dzhungaria from the Tarim Basin oases ("East Turkestani cities") by the Qing dynasty, along with Manchus, Xibo (Xibe), Solons, Han and other ethnic groups in the aftermath of the destruction of the Dzhunghars. Kulja (Ghulja) was a key area subjected to the Qing settlement of these different ethnic groups into military colonies. The Manchu garrisons were supplied and supported with grain cultivated by the Han soldiers and East Turkestani (Uyghurs) who were resettled in agricultural colonies in Dzungaria. The Manchu Qing policy of settling Chinese colonists and Taranchis from the Tarim Basin on the former Kalmucks (Dzungar) land was described as having the land "swarmed" with the settlers. The amount of Uyghurs moved by the Qing from Altä-shähär (Tarim Basin) to depopulated Dzungar land in Ili numbered around 10,000 families. The amount of Uyghurs moved by the Qing into Dzungaria at this time has been described as "large". The Qing settled in Dzungaria even more Turki-Taranchi (Uyghurs) numbering around 12,000 families originating from Kashgar in the aftermath of the Jahangir Khoja invasion in the 1820s. Standard Uyghur is based on the Taranchi dialect, which was chosen by the Chinese government for this role. Salar migrants from Amdo (Qinghai) came to settle the region as religious exiles, migrants, and as soldiers enlisted in the Chinese army to fight in Ili, often following the Hui.

In Dzungaria (Northern Xinjiang now stated but formerly appearing as part of Mongolia), the Qing exacted corvée labor for construction and infrastructure projects from Uyghur (Taranchi) colonizers and Han colonizers.

After a revolt by the Xibe in Qiqihar in 1764, the Qianlong Emperor ordered an 800-man military escort to transfer 18,000 Xibe to the Ili valley of Dzungaria in Xinjiang. In Ili, the Xinjiang Xibe built Buddhist monasteries and cultivated vegetables, tobacco and poppies. One punishment for Bannermen for their misdeeds involved them being exiled to Xinjiang.

Sibe Bannermen were stationed in Dzungaria while Northeastern China (Manchuria) was where some of the remaining Öelet Oirats were deported to. The Nonni basin was where Oirat Öelet deportees were settled. The Yenisei Kyrgyz were deported along with the Öelet. Chinese and Oirat replaced Oirat and Kyrgyz during Manchukuo as the dual languages of the Nonni-based Yenisei Kyrgyz.

In 1765, 300,000 ch'ing of land in Xinjiang were turned into military colonies, as Chinese settlement expanded to keep up with China's population growth.

The Qing resorted to incentives like issuing a subsidy which was paid to Han who was willing to migrate to the northwest to Xinjiang, in a 1776 edict. There were very little Uyghurs in Ürümqi during the Qing dynasty, Ürümqi was mostly Han and Hui and Han and Hui's settlers were concentrated in Northern Xinjiang. Around 155,000 Han and Hui lived in Xinjiang, mostly in Dzungaria around 1803, and around 320,000 Uyghurs, living mostly in Southern Xinjiang (the Tarim Basin), as Han and Hui were allowed to settle in Dzungaria but forbidden to settle in the Tarim, while the small amount of Uyghurs living in Dzungaria and Ürümqi was insignificant. Hans was around one-third of Xinjiang's population at 1800, during the time of the Qing Dynasty. Spirits (alcohol) were introduced during the settlement of Northern Xinjiang by Han Chinese flooding into the area. The Qing made a special case in allowing northern Xinjiang to be settled by Han, since they usually did not allow frontier regions to be settled by Han migrants. This policy led to 200,000 Han and Hui settlers in Northern Xinjiang when the 18th century came to a close, in addition to military colonies settled by Han called Bingtun.

The Qing Qianlong Emperor settled Hui Chinese Muslims, Han Chinese and Han Bannermen in Xinjiang, the sparsely populated and impoverished Gansu provided most of the Hui and Han settlers instead of Sichuan and other provinces with dense populations from which Qianlong wanted to relieve population pressure.

While a few people try to give a misportrayal of the historical Qing situation in light of the contemporary situation in Xinjiang with Han migration and claim that the Qing settlements and state farms were an anti-Uyghur plot to replace them in their land, Professor James A. Millward pointed out that the Qing agricultural colonies in reality had nothing to do with Uyghur and their land, since the Qing banned settlement of Han in the Uyghur Tarim Basin and in fact directed the Han settlers instead to settle in the non-Uyghur Dzungaria and the new city of Ürümqi, so that the state farms which were settled with 155,000 Han Chinese from 1760 to 1830 were all in Dzungaria and Ürümqi, where there was only an insignificant amount of Uyghurs, instead of the Tarim Basin oases.

Dzungaria which actually appears to have been in Mongolia, was subjected to mass Kazakh settlement after the defeat of the Dzungars.

The China Year Book of 1914 said that there were "Some Ch'ahars on the river Borotala in Sinkiang (N. of Ili).".

6,000 agriculturalist migrants were reported by the military governor of Ili in 1788, in Ili, 3,000 migrant agriculturalists were reported in 1783, at Ürümqi one thousand and at Ili agriculturalists of exile criminal backgrounds numbering 1,700 were reported in 1775, 1,000 or several hundred migrants moved to Ili yearly in the 1760s.

==== Kalmyk Oirats return to Dzungaria ====
The Oirat Mongol Kalmyk Khanate was founded in the 17th century with Tibetan Buddhism as its main religion, following the earlier migration of the Oirats from Dzungaria through Central Asia to the steppe around the mouth of the Volga River. During the course of the 18th century, they were absorbed by the Russian Empire, which was then expanding to the south and east. The Russian Orthodox church pressured many Kalmyks to adopt Orthodoxy. In the winter of 1770–1771, about 300,000 Kalmyks set out to return to China. Their goal was to retake control of Dzungaria from the Qing dynasty of China. Along the way many were attacked and killed by Kazakhs and Kyrgyz, their historical enemies based on intertribal competition for land and many more died of starvation and disease. After several gruelling months of travel, only one-third of the original group reached Dzungaria and had no choice but to surrender to the Qing upon arrival. These Kalmyks became known as Oirat Torghut Mongols. After being settled in Qing territory, the Torghuts were coerced by the Qing into giving up their nomadic lifestyle and to take up sedentary agriculture instead as part of a deliberate policy by the Qing to enfeeble them. They proved to be incompetent farmers and they became destitute, selling their children into slavery, engaging in prostitution and stealing, according to the Manchu Qi-yi-shi. Child slaves were in demand on the Central Asian slave market and Torghut children were sold into this slave trade. There are other accounts of the Khanate having temporarily expanded and it is also possible some of its population left it due to their imposition of Yasa, etc.

=== Settlement of the Tarim Basin ===
Han and Hui merchants were initially only allowed to trade in the Tarim Basin, while Han and Hui settlement in the Tarim Basin was banned, until the Muhammad Yusuf Khoja invasion, in 1830 when the Qing rewarded the merchants for fighting off Khoja by allowing them to settle down permanently, however, few of them actually took up on the offer. Robert Michell noted that as of 1870, there were many Chinese of all occupations living in Dzungaria and they were well settled in the area, while in Turkestan (Tarim Basin) there were only a few Chinese merchants and soldiers in several garrisons among the Muslim population.

=== Conversion of Xinjiang into a province and effect on Uyghur migration ===
After Xinjiang was converted into a province by the Qing, the provincialisation and reconstruction programs initiated by the Qing resulted in the Chinese government helping Uyghurs migrate from Southern Xinjiang to other areas of the province, like the area between Qitai and the capital, which was formerly nearly completely inhabited by Han Chinese and other areas like Ürümqi, Tacheng (Tabarghatai), Yili, Jinghe, Kur Kara Usu, Ruoqiang, Lop Nor and the Tarim River's lower reaches. It was during Qing times that Uyghurs were settled throughout all of Xinjiang, from their original home cities in the Western Tarim Basin. The Qing policies after they created Xinjiang by uniting Dzungaria and Kashgaria (Tarim Basin) led Uyghurs to believe that all of the Xinjiang province was their homeland, since the annihilation of the Dzungars by the Qing, populating the Ili valley with Uyghurs from the Tarim Basin, creating one political unit with a single name (Xinjiang) out of the previously separate Dzungaria and the Tarim Basin, the war from 1864 to 1878 which led to the killing of much of the original Han Chinese and Chinese Hui Muslims in Xinjiang, led to areas in Xinjiang with previously had insignificant amounts of Uyghurs, like the southeast, east and north, to then become settled by Uyghurs who spread through all of Xinjiang from their original home in the southwest area. There was a major and fast growth of the Uyghur population, while the original population of Han Chinese and Hui Muslims from before the war of 155,000 dropped, to the much lower population of 33,114 Tungans (Hui) and 66,000 Han.

Among the Uyghur settlers in Gulja (Yining in Ili) were Rebiya Kadeer's family, her family were descendants of migrants who moved across the Tianshan Mountains to Gulja, Merket was the hometown of her mother's father and Khotan was the hometown of her father's parents.

=== Qing era-demographics ===
At the start of the 19th century, 40 years after the Qing reconquest, there were around 155,000 Han and Hui Chinese in northern Xinjiang and somewhat more than twice that number of Uyghurs in southern Xinjiang. A census of Xinjiang under Qing rule in the early 19th century tabulated ethnic shares of the population as 30% Han and 60% Turkic, while it dramatically shifted to 6% Han and 75% Uyghur in the 1953 census, however a situation similar to the Qing era-demographics with a large number of Han has been restored as of 2000 with 40.57% Han and 45.21% Uyghur. Professor Stanley W. Toops noted that today's demographic situation is similar to that of the early Qing period in Xinjiang. Before 1831, only a few hundred Chinese merchants lived in southern Xinjiang oases (Tarim Basin) and only a few Uyghurs lived in Northern Xinjiang. Northern Xinjiang was where most Han were.

=== Population growth ===
The Qing dynasty gave large amounts of land to Chinese Hui Muslims and Han Chinese who settled in Dzungaria, while Turkic Muslim Taranchis were also moved into Dzungaria in the Ili region from Aqsu in 1760, the population of the Tarim Basin swelled to twice its original size during Qing rule for 60 years since the start. No permanent settlement was allowed in the Tarim Basin, with only merchants and soldiers being allowed to stay temporarily, up until the 1830s after Jahangir's invasion, after which the Tarim Basin was open to Han Chinese and Hui (Tungan) colonization. The 19th century rebellions caused the population of Han to drop; the name "Eastern Turkestan" was used for the area consisting of Uyghuristan (Turfan and Hami) in the northeast and Kashgaria in the southwest, with various estimates given by foreign visitors on the entire region's population. At the start of Qing rule, the population was concentrated more towards Kucha's western region with around 260,000 people living in the Tarim Basin, with 300,000 living at the start of the 19th century, one tenth of them lived in Uyghuristan in the east while the Tarim Basin had seven tenths of the population.

== Republic of China ==
Hui Muslim General Bai Chongxi was interested in Xinjiang. He wanted to resettle disbanded Chinese soldiers there to prevent it from being seized by the Soviet Union. The Kuomintang settled 20,000 Han in Xinjiang in 1943.

== People's Republic of China ==
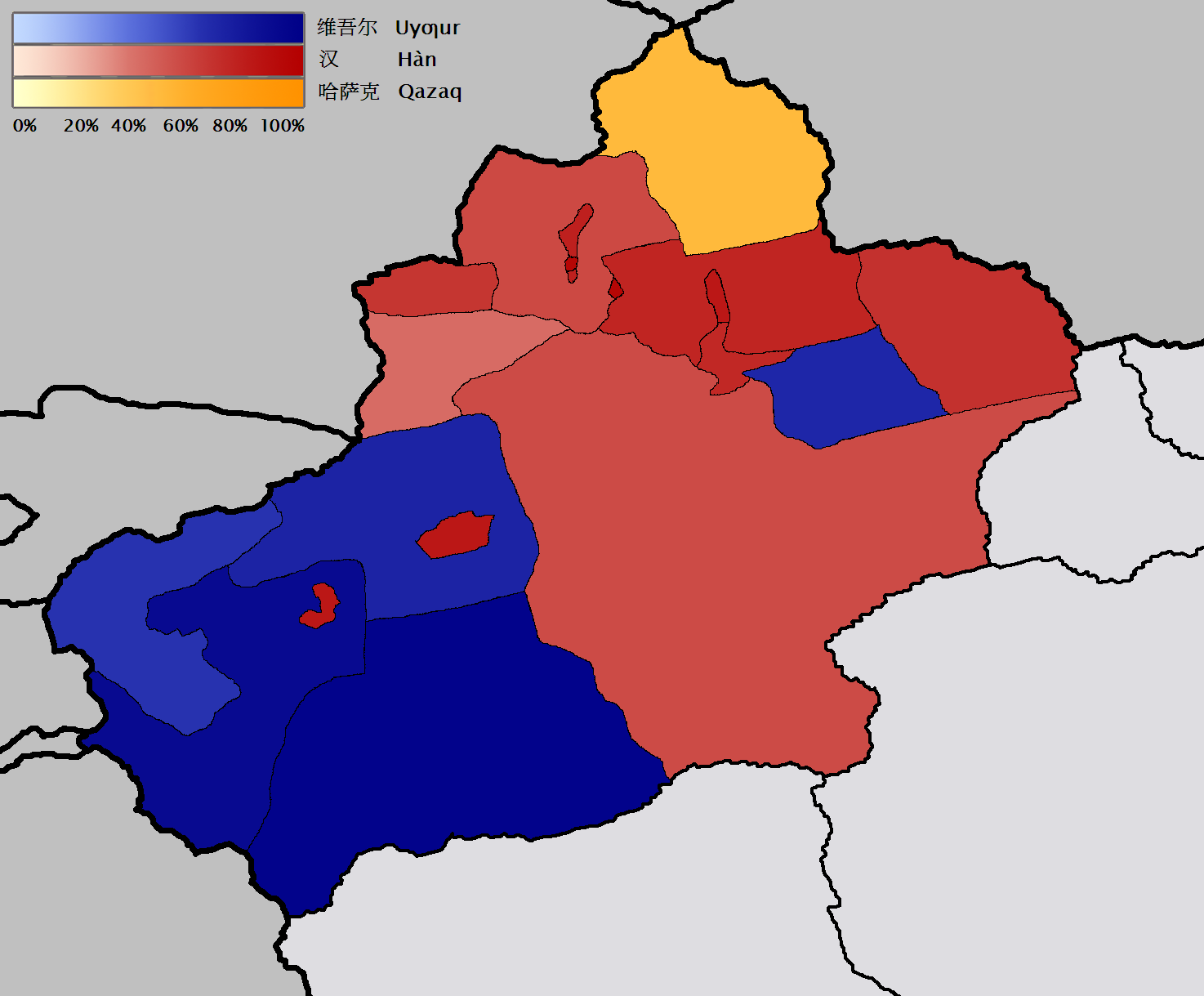
Ethnic pluralities in Xinjiang by prefecture, 2000: Uyghur plurality Han plurality Kazakh plurality

The People's Republic of China has directed the majority of Han migrants towards the sparsely populated Dzungaria (Junggar Basin). Before 1953, 75% of Xinjiang's population lived in the Tarim Basin, thus the Han migrants resulted in the distribution of population between Dzungaria and the Tarim being changed. Most new Chinese migrants ended up in the northern region, in Dzungaria. Han and Hui made up the majority of the population in Dzungaria's cities while Uyghurs made up most of the population in Kashgaria's cities. Eastern and Central Dzungaria are the specific areas where these Han and Hui are concentrated. China made sure that new Han migrants were settled in entirely new areas uninhabited by Uyghurs so as to not disturb the already existing Uyghur communities. Lars-Erik Nyman noted that Kashgaria was the native land of the Uyghurs, "but a migration has been in progress to Dzungaria since the 18th century".

From 1943 to 1968, nearly 5 million Hans immigrated to Xinjiang (particularly northern Xinjiang, deliberately keeping away from the Uyghur-populated southern Xinjiang) from other parts of China: in 1969, an Australian journalist in the region noted that Russian regional aid was withdrawn in that interval, and specifically:

In 1943, the whole of Sinkiang had 4,300,00 people. Of these, 75 per cent were Uyghurs, 10 per cent were Kazakhs, and only 6 per cent were Chinese. But by last year the Chinese had become the biggest single element in the population, passing the Uyghurs with 44 per cent. Virtually all the 5,000,000 population increase in that time has come from Chinese immigrants.

This included 2 million Han to northern Xinjiang in 1957–1967 alone. Both Han economic migrants from other parts of China and Uyghur economic migrants from southern Xinjiang have also been flooding into northern Xinjiang since the 1980s.

From the 1950s to the 1970s, 92% of migrants to Xinjiang were Han and 8% were Hui. Most of the migrants after the 1970s were unorganized settlers coming from neighboring Gansu Province to seek trading opportunities. There were uprisings during the 1950s and or maybe 1960s according to the Pengin Historical Atlas of World History volume 2 by Hermann Kinder and Werner Hilgemann.

After the Sino-Soviet split in 1962, over 60,000 people, mostly Kazakhs and among them detectors, left Xinjiang for the Kazakh Soviet Socialist Republic. China responded by reinforcing the Xinjiang-Soviet border area specifically with Han Bingtuan militia and farmers.

Xinjiang's importance to China increased after the Soviet invasion of Afghanistan in 1979, leading to China's perception of being encircled by the Soviets. The Chinese authorities viewed the Han migrants in Xinjiang as vital to defending the area against the Soviet Union.

Since the reform and opening up from the late 1970s has exacerbated uneven regional development, more Uyghurs have migrated to Xinjiang cities and some Han's has also migrated to Xinjiang for independent economic advancement.

In the 1990s, there was a net inflow of Han people to Xinjiang, many of whom were previously prevented from moving because of the declining number of social services tied to hukou (residency permits). As of 1996, 13.6% of Xinjiang's population was employed by the publicly traded Xinjiang Production and Construction Corps (Bingtuan) corporation. 90% of the Bingtuans activities relate to agriculture and 88% of Bingtuan employees are Han, although the percentage of Hans with ties to the Bingtuan has decreased. Han emigration from Xinjiang has also resulted in an increase of minority-identified agricultural workers as a total percentage of Xinjiang's farmers, from 69.4% in 1982 to 76.7% in 1990. During the 1990s, about 1.2 million temporary migrants entered Xinjiang every year to stay for the cotton picking season. Many Uyghur trading communities exist outside of Xinjiang; the largest in Beijiang is one village of a few thousand.

There was a chain of press releases in the 1990s on the violent insurrections in Xinjiang, some were made by the former Soviet supported URFET leader Yusupbek Mukhlisi.

There was a 1.7% growth in the Uyghur population in Xinjiang from 1940 to 1982, while there was a 4.4% growth in the Hui population during the same period. Uyghur Muslims and Hui Muslims have experienced a growth in major tensions against each other due to the Hui population surging in its growth. Some old Uyghurs in Kashgar remember that the Hui army at the Battle of Kashgar (1934) massacred 2,000 to 8,000 Uyghurs, which caused tension as more Hui moved into Kashgar from other parts of China.

== See also ==
- Migration in China
- Demographics of China
- Economy of China
- Hukou system
- Turkic settlement of the Tarim Basin
- Metropolitan regions of China
- Urbanization in China
- Affirmative action in China
- Manifest destiny
- March to the West
