= Yao Lianwei =

Chinese politician

- 姚连蔚

Personal details
- Born: 1935
- Died: 2 October 2012 (aged 76–77)

Yao Lianwei (Chinese: 姚连蔚; 1935 – 2 October 2012) was a Chinese male politician, who served as the vice chairperson of the Standing Committee of the National People's Congress.
