= Tatars in China =

Turkic ethnic group in Xinjiang, China

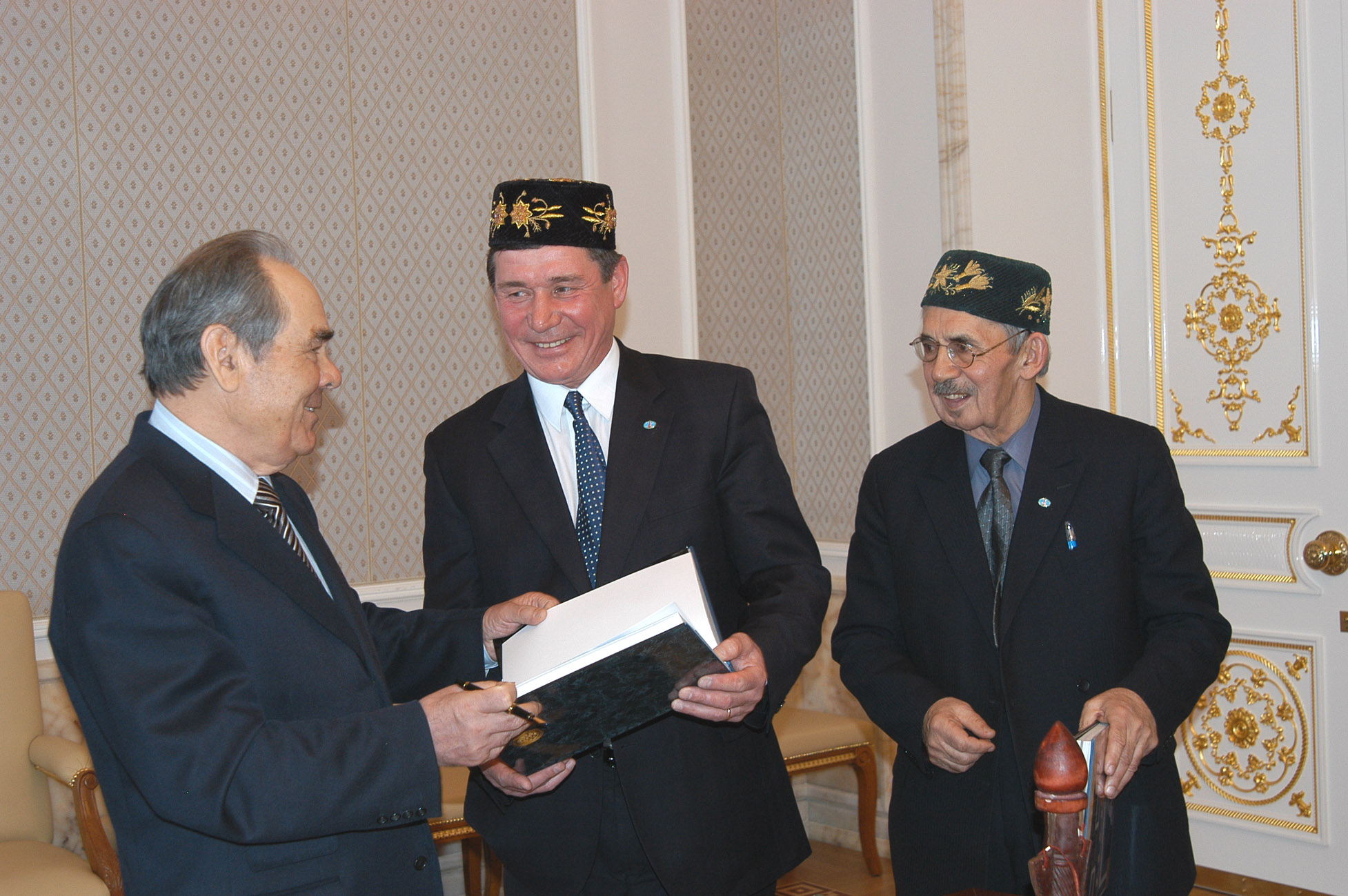
- Tatarstan President Mintimer Shaimiev (left) with representatives of China's Tatar community, 2003

Total population
- 3,544 (2021)

Regions with significant populations
- Northern Xinjiang (Dzungaria)

Languages
- Tatar, Mandarin, Uyghur, Kazakh

Religion
- Islam

Related ethnic groups
- Other Volga Tatars

Chinese name
- Simplified Chinese: 塔塔尔族
- Traditional Chinese: 塔塔爾族
Transcriptions
Standard Mandarin
- Hanyu Pinyin: Tǎtǎ'ěrzú

Tatar name
- Tatar: татарлар tatarlar

Tatars (Chinese: 塔塔尔族; pinyin: Tǎtǎ'ěrzú; Tatar: татарлар, romanized: tatarlar) are the smallest of the 56 ethnic groups officially recognized by the Chinese government. They are a Turkic people who mostly live in northern Xinjiang, around the Dzungarian Basin (Dzungaria). As of 2020, there are 3,544 Tatars in China, concentrated in the cities of Yining (Ghulja), Tacheng (Qoqek), Altay, and Ürümqi, as well as the herding areas of Burqin County and Qitai County. The Daquan Tatar Ethnic Township in Qitai County, which sits on the edge of the Gurbantünggüt Desert, is the only subdivision designated for Tatars.

== History ==
The Tatars in China are descendants of Volga Tatars who migrated to Xinjiang from their native Idel-Ural region in modern-day Russia. The Tatars have traditionally acted as mediators between the Russians and the native Muslim peoples of Xinjiang. The first wave of permanent Tatar settlement in Xinjiang began in 1851, primarily in cities such as Ghulja (Yining). Tatars brought progressive ideas and new institutions into Xinjiang, where they cemented themselves in the cultural and political fabric of the region. Jadid schools (including institutions for girls), mosques, and libraries catering to the Tatar community were opened in the second half of the 19th century and in the first decades of the 20th century. During this period, many intellectuals were brought from Tatarstan to staff the schools and colleges.

Following the incorporation of Xinjiang into the People's Republic of China, the Chinese central government consulted the Tatar community on what they wished to be called in Standard Chinese. The previous pinyin (Mandarin Chinese) transcription of Tatar (which is still used to refer to the Volga Tatars) was Dádá, with several variant transcriptions into Chinese characters, including 鞑靼, 达靼, 达怛, 达旦, and 达达. The majority of Tatars ultimately agreed on a new transcription: Tǎtǎ'ěr (塔塔尔).

== Language ==
The Tatar language in China is limited to conversation and singing among older adults. An archaic variant is spoken with influences from other Turkic languages, primarily Uyghur and Kazakh. Conversely, Tatar influences can be found in the Uyghur and Kazakh spoken in the far-northwestern border city of Tacheng (Qoqek). Almost all Tatars are multilingual and speak Uyghur or Kazakh in addition to Standard Chinese.

There is no official writing system for the Tatar language in China; Tatars often use Uyghur or Kazakh as a literary language. In 1957, the Chinese government's Xinjiang Committee on Languages and Scripts recommended the adoption of the Cyrillic alphabet for Tatar that the Soviet Union had introduced that year, but the Chinese authorities never followed through.

== Culture ==
Sabantuy, or the Plough Festival, is a traditional summer festival of the Tatars and is listed as a national intangible cultural heritage in China. A Muslim people, the Tatars in China also celebrate Islamic holidays.

Cleanliness and orderliness are important aspects of Tatar etiquette at home. Tatar dining rooms and kitchens are known for being spotless.

== Notable people ==
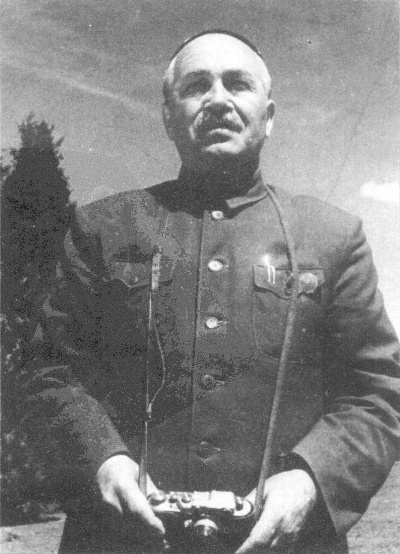
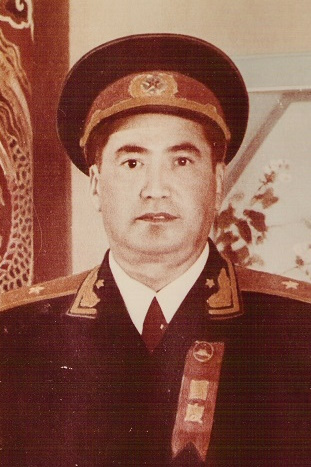
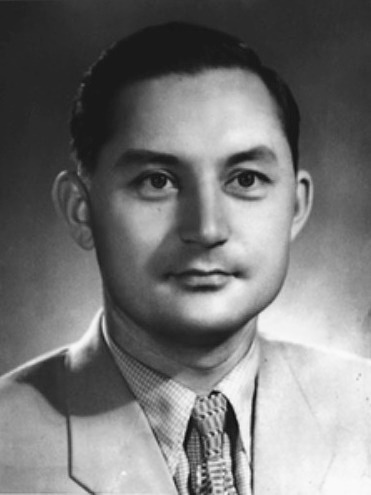
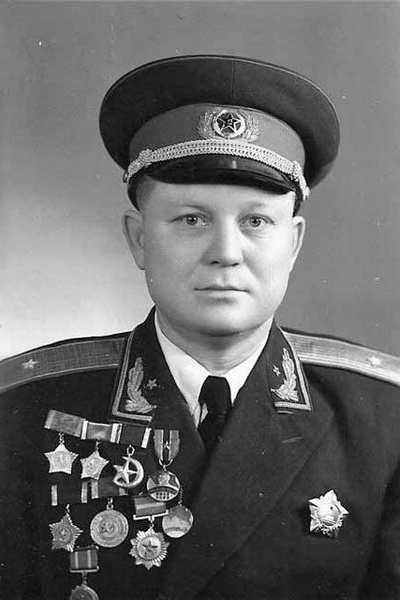
Four prominent Tatars in the early history of the Xinjiang UAR. Clockwise from the top left: Burhan Shahidi, Zunun Taipov, Margub Iskhakov, and Asgat Iskhakov.
- Burhan Shahidi (1894–1989), Chairman of the Xinjiang UAR Government
- Habib Yunich (1905–1945), Education Minister of the Second East Turkestan Republic
- Zunun Taipov (1917–1984), Lieutenant General of the People's Liberation Army
- Asgat Iskhakov (1921–1976), Vice Chairman of the Xinjiang UAR Government
- Margub Iskhakov (1923–1992), Lieutenant General of the People's Liberation Army

== See also ==
- Russians in China
