= The Church of Jesus Christ of Latter-day Saints in South Korea =

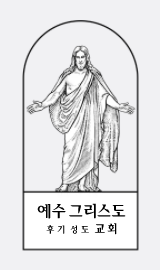
- Church Logo in Korean

- Area: Asia North
- Members: 89,092 (2025)
- Stakes: 12
- Districts: 5
- Wards: 60
- Branches: 39
- Total congregations: 99
- Missions: 3
- Temples: 1 operating; 1 announced; 2 total
- FamilySearch Centers: 24

The Church of Jesus Christ of Latter-day Saints (LDS Church) (Korean: 예수 그리스도 후기 성도 교회) was unofficially established in South Korea as early as World War II due to religious influence by servicemen who were church members. However, Korean people did not begin to get baptized until the missionary efforts of Latter-day Saint servicemen during the Korean War. Kim Ho Jik was the first Korean person to be baptized into the church on July 29, 1951, in New York. Two of his children were of the first four Korean people baptized in Korea on August 3, 1952. The church's presence and missionary work was officially established on April 20, 1956, with the arrival of two missionaries: Don G. Powell and Richard L. Detton. The Korean Mission opened on July 8, 1962, with Gail E. Carr as its first president. Successful missionary work led to the church's growth in the 1960s and 1970s leading to the organization of the first stake in Korea in 1973 and the dedication of the first temple in Seoul on December 14, 1985.

Translation of the Book of Mormon was a lengthy process that commenced in the 1950s, however translators had a difficult time finishing the project. Kim Jo Hik aided translation throughout the process, but the translation was completed by Han In Sang and published on March 29, 1967. A re-translation of the Book of Mormon was completed in 2005.

As of 2025, the church reported 89,092 members in 99 congregations in South Korea, making it the third largest body of Latter-day Saints in Asia behind the Philippines and Japan.

== History ==
Membership
Year	Members
1954	64
1960	537
1970	4,245
1980	45,958
1989*	50,000
1999	71,166
2009	81,251
2019	88,622
2025	89,092
*Membership was published as an estimated or rounded number. Source: Windall J. Ashton; Jim M. Wall, Deseret News, various years, Church Almanac Country Information: South Korea

=== 1950–1962: The Korean War and missionary efforts ===
Fresh after being released after president of the Japan Mission, Alma Owen Taylor and missionary Frederick A. Caine visited Korea in January 1910 for a few weeks to determine whether Korea was ready for LDS Church missionaries. Taylor recognized their increasing interest in Christianity but wondered if it was purely political interest. This represented the church's first contact with Korea; however, its first prolonged influence was by United States servicemen stationed in the country during World War II. The first baptism in Korea was of a U.S. soldier. The first Korean church member was Kim Ho Jik, who joined the church on July 29, 1951, while obtaining his doctorate at Cornell University. He had been sent to New York in 1949 by the South Korean president to learn about nutrition and bring that knowledge back to improve Korea. While attending Cornell, Kim was given a copy of the Articles of Faith by a Latter-day Saint friend. After reading the Articles of Faith, he read the Book of Mormon. He was baptized in the Susquehanna River on July 29, 1951. Kim Tai Whan and Kim Young Sook, his son and daughter, as well as a former student of Kim's and her daughter, were the first four baptisms in Korea on August 3, 1952. Korean citizens who worshiped with U.S. military servicemen at church services in Pusan and Seoul also began to be baptized as members.

By September 1953, over twenty Korean members had joined the LDS Church in Pusan. After the cease fire, most members moved back to Seoul, which became the center of the church in Korea. Due to problems maintaining a permanent place of worship, in February 1954, a Korean Sunday School was established with Kim as superintendent. This was the first native Korean Latter-day Saint organization established in the country. There were over sixty regularly attending members by April 1954. During this time, most of the church members in Korea were young male students. One of these original members, Han In Sang, later become a church general authority. Sang was also the first native Korean to serve a full-time mission. The Far East Mission (or Japanese Mission) consisted of many Asian countries including Korea, however proselytizing missionaries were only sent to Japan, and not yet Korea.

During a visit to Korea in 1955, Joseph Fielding Smith, of the church's Quorum of the Twelve Apostles dedicated Korea for missionary work on August 2, 1955. Even though the church was not recognized by the Korean government as an official ecclesiastical organization, Kim became president of the Korean District of the Northern Far East Mission. Additionally, servicemen branches and native Korean branches were separated and church branches were officially created in Seoul and Pusan. Kim helped Paul C. Andrus, president of the Northern Far East Mission, get the church recognized by the government, lease a missionary house, and obtain the approval of visas for the missionaries. Having been transferred from missions in Japan, Don G. Powell and Richard L. Detton were the church's first missionaries in Korea. They arrived on April 20, 1956. Six more missionaries were sent to Korea the following summer, with four of them going to Pusan.

Due to postwar conditions in Korea, in summer 1958, half of the missionaries became sick with hepatitis. Missionaries had difficulties learning Korean. Church materials such as the Book of Mormon and hymnbooks were not translated into Korean until over a year after full-time missionary work began. Kim translated the Articles of Faith and the sacrament prayers, but missionaries still had difficulties communicating in Korean. Missionaries were sent translated tracts and pamphlets in September 1957, replacing ones in the Japanese language they had been previously using. For the next few years, missionaries were getting about eighteen baptisms a year, which was the highest of any mission at the time. This high rate of baptisms plateaued in 1964. Eighty percent of original converts were male, and this trend continued into the 1970s with over half of converts being male. At first, this was likely due to more contact between servicemen and Korean men. However, after the Korean War, the trend likely continued due to Korea's male-oriented society. Missionary work targeted men rather than women, by policy. After the economic effects of the Korean War began to diminish, Korean's interest in religion diminished as well and baptisms declined beginning in 1965.

=== Translation of the Book of Mormon ===
The first attempted translations of the Book of Mormon were done with the Japanese language and recently completed Japanese translation in mind. This caused problems, because Korean people held animosity for the Japanese people due to Japan's recent occupation of Korea due to World War II. Previously, the first copies of the Book of Mormon used in Korea were in English and Japanese. Students learning English were given the English version whereas older individuals were given the Japanese version because Korean people were forced to learn Japanese when they were occupied by Japan.

Kim Ho Jik was one of the first involved in the translation process, having already translated the sacramental prayers and Articles of Faith. Kim supervised the translation process, working with Chang Se Cheon and Cheong Dae Pan. Kim translated the English into Korean verbally, and Chang wrote down the translation. Due to Kim's other obligations, this was a slow process, so Chang eventually took over the daily translation. Only one half of the book was completed, because Chang moved to Utah in 1959. A second translation was attempted by Hong Byeong Shik and Kim on August 23, 1959; however Kim died of a heart attack eight days later. Hong worked alone as a translator with his wife as his scribe. It is unknown whether Hong referred to Chang's previous translation, but he most likely referred to Japanese versions. After a year, the translation was completed in 1961. Hong was assisted by missionaries and church members during the editing process. The translation was edited and typset around 5 times between 1961 and 1962. Due to the extension revisions necessary, a small pocket edition of 3 Nephi was published before the rest of the manuscript.

When Gail Carr became mission president, he allowed missionary Bruce K. Grant to gather opinions on the translation from both Korean members and academics. Grant concluded that the translation should be reworked to more closely match the 1957 re-translated Japanese version. The new Japanese version used clearer language and was less "archaic" than its predecessor. Cheong became head translator in 1964. After Cheong became Korean district president, conflicting assignments forced Cheong to ask to be released. Lee Ho Nam replaced Cheong. However, Cheong still aided in translation. LDS Church leaders became concerned that the church in Korea had already existed for 10 years but there was no Korean translation of the Book of Mormon. Carr asked Han In Sang to revise and complete the translation in 1964. Cheong continued to translate, but consented to Han revising some of his translations. After reviewing Cheong's work, Han decided to re-translate the whole Book of Mormon in 1965; he consulted Hong's published 3 Nephi, Cheong's translation, and the English version. Han completed the draft in 1966. After Carr was released as mission president, the first Korean translation of the Book of Mormon was published on March 29, 1967.

Since the Book of Mormon was published in 1967, there have been several editions. The church's Translation Department initiated a new translation in the early 1990s, translated from the 1981 English version. A new translation was published in 2005. Including the history and author, little is known about this translation. Due to the new translation, the church changed its name in Korea from "Maril Seongdo Yesu Keuriseudo Kyohoe" (The Last Day Saints Church of Jesus Christ") to "Yesu Keuriseudo Hugi Seongdo Kyohoe" ("The Church of Jesus Christ of Latter-day/Second-term Saints").

=== 1962–1985: Establishment of the Korean Mission and expansion ===
The first mission in Korea was established on July 8, 1962. Gail E. Carr became the first president of the Korean Mission. At thirty-two years old, he was one of the youngest mission presidents at the time. Korean membership had reached 1,603; there were five branches and nineteen missionaries serving in Korea. Carr initiated the construction of a chapel for the Seoul East Branch; this was one of the first chapels of the Church on the Asian continent. Carr purchased vital church properties, created two new branches, initiated a language study program, and encouraged translation of church materials during his presidency. Carr's wife organized the first Relief Society in Korea. Because they did not yet have translated Relief Society instruction materials, the sisters met and discussed homemaking. After Kim Jung Sook translated the materials, they were able to have formal Relief Society instruction. After Carr, the next three mission presidents were carefully chosen based on academic accomplishment due to the Korean values of education.

Spencer J. Palmer began his mission presidency after Carr on August 2, 1965. Palmer had previously served as an Army chaplain in Korea and he was a professor of Korean studies and eastern religions at Brigham Young University (BYU). While missionary work and the establishment of the church in Korea had been fairly successful, its membership was unstable due to the large number of student members and Korean leadership was lacking, relying too heavily on the leadership of young American missionaries. On January 2, 1966, Palmer and a Korean District choir participated in a 30-minute program on television that presented song and testimony. Palmer answered common questions about the church and invited citizens who were watching to learn more through its missionaries. Other Christmas programs continued on television, radio, and in-person performances. The Korean people responded to these programs very well. Music & the Spoken Word was broadcast in Korea, at the time suggested by Palmer as the only foreign language mission in Asia and perhaps the world in which the program was broadcast to native residents weekly.

By 1965, the church in Korea had one district and seven branches. Four branches were in Seoul, two were in Pusan, and one was in Taegu. In 1968, the Church in Korea was divided into two districts with thirteen branches and three unofficial church gatherings. The Southern District in Pusan was created in February 1968; the Central District remained in Seoul. Because missionary policy required that missionaries focus on heads of families, friends of the church, and generally older individuals, the average age of its members increased by five years. More families joined the church, tithing payment increased, and membership increased from 2,529 in 1965 to 3,317 in 1968. The mission home was constructed in 1966; Palmer insisted that the building parts be entirely made in Korea to show the church's loyalty to Korea and its industry. Palmer also bought the property in Seoul on which the first temple would be built.

In 1966, Hugh B. Brown, of the First Presidency, became the first general authority to be invited to speak in Korea at Yonsei University. On the last day of Brown's visit, he participated in a flag raising ceremony at the church's headquarters in Seoul. Brown told Korean church members to be proud citizens and to be an example by serving the Lord through serving their country. Robert H. Slover became the next mission president in August 1968. During his service, baptisms increased to around 500 per year, on average. The average number of baptisms per missionary per year at the end of 1969 was 7.1 with nearly one hundred missionaries serving in Korea. New branches and proselyting areas were opened and the Honam District was established.

Robert H. Slover became the next mission president in summer 1968. Slover focused on improving the administrative and organizational aspects of the church in Korea. Under his direction, the number of districts increased to four and the number of missionaries increased from 75 to 125. Baptisms began to increase in 1969, in part, because of the establishment of the Language Training Mission in Hawaii. This allowed missionaries to come to Korea with greater Korean language skills and a greater ability to proselyte and teach the Korean people. Other organizational changes related to missionary work and housing improvements allowed for missionaries that were in better health, better trained, supervised, and motivated. L. Edward Brown became mission president in 1971. In contrast to Palmer and Slover's strategy to send missionaries to every established area in South Korea, Brown believed that concentrating missionaries in large cities and creating strong church centers was the best strategy. Brown also emphasized putting only Korean members in church leadership positions. At the end of Brown's service, the number of missionaries in Korea was 180. Palmer, Slover, and Brown had difficulty obtaining church property and few church buildings were built during their presidencies.

In 1973, Spencer W. Kimball organized the first stake, with Rhee Ho Nam called as its first president. Despite the organization of the stake, it wasn't until 1979 that each ward had their own separate chapel. In 1975 and 1976, the Church Educational System constructed the first Institute building outside of North America. In 1975, the Korean Pusan (Busan) Mission was created with Han In Sang as mission president. Church growth was significant in the 1970s, with its membership at 12,971 at the end of 1978. Due to growth, the Seoul Korea West Stake was established in 1977. The Seoul Korea East Stake was created April 18, 1979, with the Seoul Korea North Stake created three days later. The Tabernacle Choir at Temple Square (then the Mormon Tabernacle Choir) first performed in Korea in September 1979. This represented the choir's first tour to the Far East. D. Brent Clement was named president of the newly created Korea Seoul West Mission in 1980, but he was quickly transferred to the Korea Seoul Mission and Kim Cha Bong was named the president of the Korea Seoul West Mission instead. Gordon B. Hinckley dedicated the first Korean temple in Seoul on December 14, 1985. A missionary training center (MTC) was built next to the temple in the 1986. The fourth mission in Korea was established in 1986 as the Korea Taejŏn (Daejeon) Mission with Hong Moo Kwang as president.

=== 1988–Present: Recent developments ===
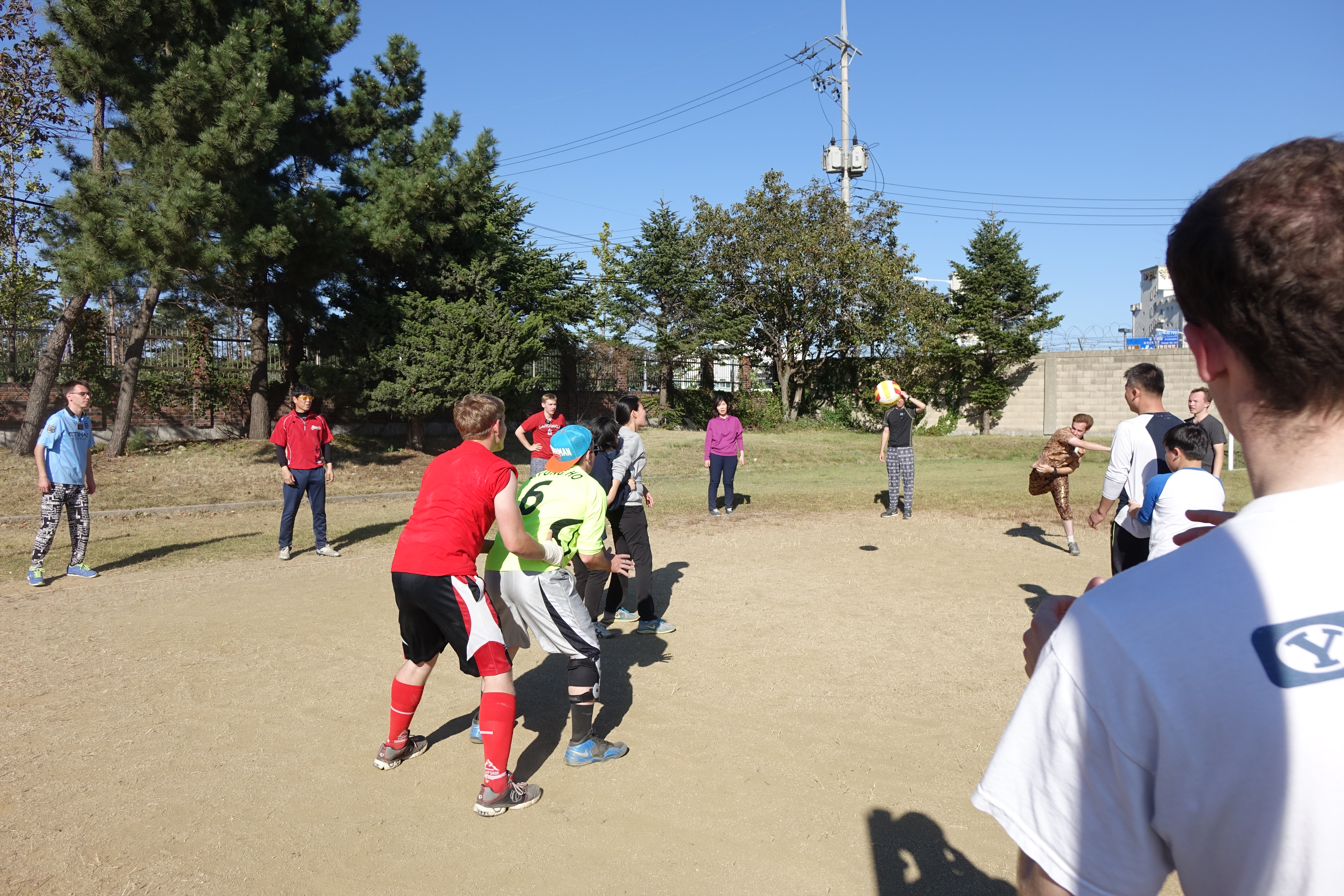
An October 2015 athletic competition sponsored by a local congregation of The Church of Jesus Christ of Latter-day Saints in Gangneung.

The BYU International Folk Dance Ensemble performed in the Opening Ceremonies of the 1988 Summer Olympics in Seoul. In 1991, the one-millionth copy of the Korean translation of the Book of Mormon was sold. Near the end of 1996, there were around 70,000 church members in Korea. Besides Japan, Korea is one of the only countries in the world whose Latter-day Saint community is self-supporting. Members contributed funds to the construction of most of the church buildings and chapels in Korea. In 2001, Dallin H. Oaks met with Korea's prime minister at the time, Lee Han-Dong, while at a regional conference in Seoul. In 2010, the Korea Seoul West Mission merged into the Korea Seoul Mission to better allocate resources to the growing church in Korea. The MTC in Seoul closed around March 2013. The Korea Seoul South Mission was created in 2013. In January 2019, the church announced that the boundaries of the Korea Daejeon Mission would be shifting and it would be merging into another mission in July 2019.

== Compatibility with Korean culture ==
Missionary work has been more successful in Korea than many other non-Christian Asian countries. First of all, previous missions to Korea by other Christian denominations prepared Korean people for Latter-day Saint missionaries. Additionally, the Confucian values embedded in Korean culture have influenced Korea in keeping and maintaining high-quality genealogical records. The church's emphasis on genealogy and family history allows Korean members to respect and honor their ancestors by completing ceremonies for them in temples. Furthermore, other emphases of the church such as education, the eternal nature of the family, and temple work have been very appealing to the Korean people. Moreover, missionary success in the early history of the church in Korea was influenced by the political and economic turmoil surrounding the Korean War. Suffering and hardship caused the Korean people to look to other religious and philosophical sources for answers to their questions.

Although the deeply-rooted Confucian and Buddhist traditions and values in Korea are beginning to change, there are a few aspects of Korean culture that are causing problems for the church in Korea. First, education in South Korea and entrance examinations into higher education require a lot of time for students in order to succeed. Although the church tends to support the success of its members as well as high educational goals, its leaders have been concerned that students do not have time to attend church or develop their faith. Second, marriage in Korea is often regulated by parents, using the principles of kunghap, similar to astrology, in which compatibility of couples is determined by the year, month, day, and hour in which someone is born. This is different from Latter-day Saint values which encourage marriage, and especially marriage to another member of the church.

== Stakes ==
Stake	Organized	Mission
Busan Korea Stake	6 Sep 1979	Korea Busan
Changwon Korea Stake	20 Nov 1982	Korea Busan
Cheongju Korea Stake	28 Nov 1982	Korea Seoul South
Daegu Korea Stake	6 Nov 1983	Korea Busan
Daejeon Korea Stake	8 Mar 1998	Korea Seoul South
Gangneung Korea District	17 Apr 1987	Korea Seoul
Gwangju Korea Stake	25 Oct 1980	Korea Busan
Gyeonggi Korea Stake	28 Nov 1982	Korea Seoul South
Jeju Korea District	15 Apr 2001	Korea Busan
Jeonju Korea Stake	27 Apr 1986	Korea Seoul South
Seoul Korea East Stake	18 Apr 1979	Korea Seoul
Seoul Korea Military District	1 Jan 1970	Korea Seoul South
Seoul Korea South Stake	22 May 1977	Korea Seoul
Seoul Korea Stake	8 Mar 1973	Korea Seoul
Seoul Korea West Stake	12 Nov 1981	Korea Seoul
Suncheon Korea District	7 Jan 1996	Korea Busan
Ulsan Korea District	3 Jun 2007	Korea Busan

== Missions ==
Mission	Organized
Korea Busan Mission	1 July 1975
Korea Seoul Mission	8 July 1962
Korea Seoul South Mission	1 July 2013

== Temples ==
April 14, 1985, the Seoul Korea Temple was dedicated. Within the church, there is a distinction between a meetinghouse and a temple. Temples are not used for regular Sunday worship, like meetinghouses, but are used for ordinances members believe to be sacred: proxy baptisms for deceased ancestors, sealings, meant to unite families for eternity, and instruction ceremonies about the purpose of life called the endowment. Inside, members reaffirm teachings of Jesus Christ, and make covenants to serve Christ and their fellow men. Members believe it is the most sacred place of worship on earth, and is a house of the Lord. By 1985, there were numerous meetinghouses but only one temple in Korea.

37. Seoul Korea Temple; Official website; News & images	
Location: Announced: Groundbreaking: Dedicated: Size: Style:	Seoul, South Korea; 1 April 1981 by Spencer W. Kimball; 9 May 1983 by Marvin J. Ashton; 14 December 1985 by Gordon B. Hinckley; 28,057 sq ft (2,606.6 m^{2}) on a 1-acre (0.40 ha) site Modern adaptation of six-spire design - designed by Church A&E Services and Komerican Architects
307. Busan Korea Temple (Announced); Official website; News & images	
Location: Announced:	Busan, Korea; 2 October 2022 by Russell M. Nelson

== See also ==
- Christianity in Korea
- Religion in Korea

== Bibliography ==
- Britsch, R. Lanier (1998). From the East: The History of the Latter-day Saints in Asia: 1851-1996. Salt Lake City, Utah: Deseret Book Company. ISBN 1573452688.
- Palmer, Spencer J. (1970). The Church Encounters Asia. Salt Lake City, Utah: Deseret Book Company.
- Palmer, Spencer J.; Palmer, Shirley H., eds. (1995). The Korean Saints: Personal Stories of Trial and Triumph 1950-1980. Provo, Utah: Religious Education, Brigham Young University.
- Palmer, Spencer J. (1997). "Rhee Honam: Hallmarks of a Korean Pioneer". In Van Orden, Bruce A.; Smith, D. Brent; Smith Jr., Everett (eds.). Pioneers in Every Land. Salt Lake City, Utah: Bookcraft. ISBN 1570083061.
- Rhee, Ho Nam (1978). "The Church in Korea". In Tullis, F. LaMond (ed.). Mormonism: A Faith for All Cultures. Provo, Utah: Brigham Young University Press. ISBN 0842512829.
- van Dyk, Gerrit (2015). "A Long, Hard Trial: The Korean Translations of the Book of Mormon". BYU ScholarsArchive.
