= List of folk dance performance groups =

This is a list of notable folk dance performance groups, listed by country of origin.

== Bulgaria ==
- Pirin Folk Ensemble

== Canada ==
- Chai Folk Ensemble
- Cheremosh Ukrainian Dance Company

== China ==
- China National Ethnic Song and Dance Ensemble

== Croatia ==
- National Folk Dance Ensemble of Croatia LADO

== Macedonia ==
- Tanec

== Estonia ==
- University of Tartu Folk Art Ensemble

== Honduras ==
- Ballet Folklórico de Honduras Oro Lenca

== Mexico ==
- Ballet Folklorico Aztlan
- Ballet Folklorico de Mexico

== Philippines ==
- Bayanihan Philippine National Folk Dance Company
- Ramon Obusan Folkloric Group

== Poland ==
- Mazowsze
- Śląsk Song and Dance Ensemble

== Turkey ==
- Fire of Anatolia

== Ukraine ==
- P. Virsky Ukrainian National Folk Dance Ensemble

== United States ==
- American Indian Dance Theatre
- Ballet Folklorico Paso Del Norte
- Brigham Young University Folk Dance Ensemble
- Duquesne University Tamburitzans
- Mandala folk dance ensemble
