= Rhee Ho Nam =

Personal life
- Born: 28 February 1934; Shimonoseki, Japan
- Died: 5 June 2003 (aged 69)

Religious life
- Religion: Mormonism

Korean name
- Hangul: 이호남
- RR: I Honam
- MR: I Honam

Rhee Ho Nam (28 February 1934 – 5 June 2003) was the first president of a stake of the Church of Jesus Christ of Latter-day Saints (LDS Church) in South Korea. He later served as a professor of Korean at Brigham Young University in Provo, Utah, United States.

== Early life ==
Rhee was born to Korean migrant parents in Shimonoseki, Japan. The family returned to South Korea in 1954.

Rhee joined the LDS Church in 1954. He was introduced to the LDS faith by Calvin R. Beck, a member of the United States military. Beck was rotated home before Ho Nam was baptized. He was baptized by Allen Van Potts an army friend of Calvin Beck. Rhee was confirmed by Harold B. Lee.

Rhee had a master's degree from Yonsei University and an Ed.D. from Brigham Young University.

== Career ==
Rhee was among Kim Ho Jik's Sunday School students.

In 1965, Rhee became a counselor in the Korean Mission Presidency of the church. In 1967, he traveled to Salt Lake City, Utah to present copies of the Book of Mormon translated into Korean to church president David O. McKay. While in Salt Lake City, Rhee and his wife Youn Soon were sealed in the Salt Lake Temple by Gordon B. Hinckley.

In 1972, Rhee became the Korea Area director for the Church Educational System. This was one of the first cases where the CES program was established with a local leader without having had an American head previously. In March 1973, he was made the president of the Seoul Korea Stake by apostle Spencer W. Kimball.

From 1978 to 1981, Rhee was the president of the Busan Korea Mission of the church. He was a temple worker in the Seoul Korea Temple when it opened in 1985.

In 1987, Rhee became a professor of the Department of Asian and Near Eastern Languages at Brigham Young University. While living in Utah, he served as a bishop and a Missionary Training Center branch president.
