= Dunhuang dance =

Chinese dance style

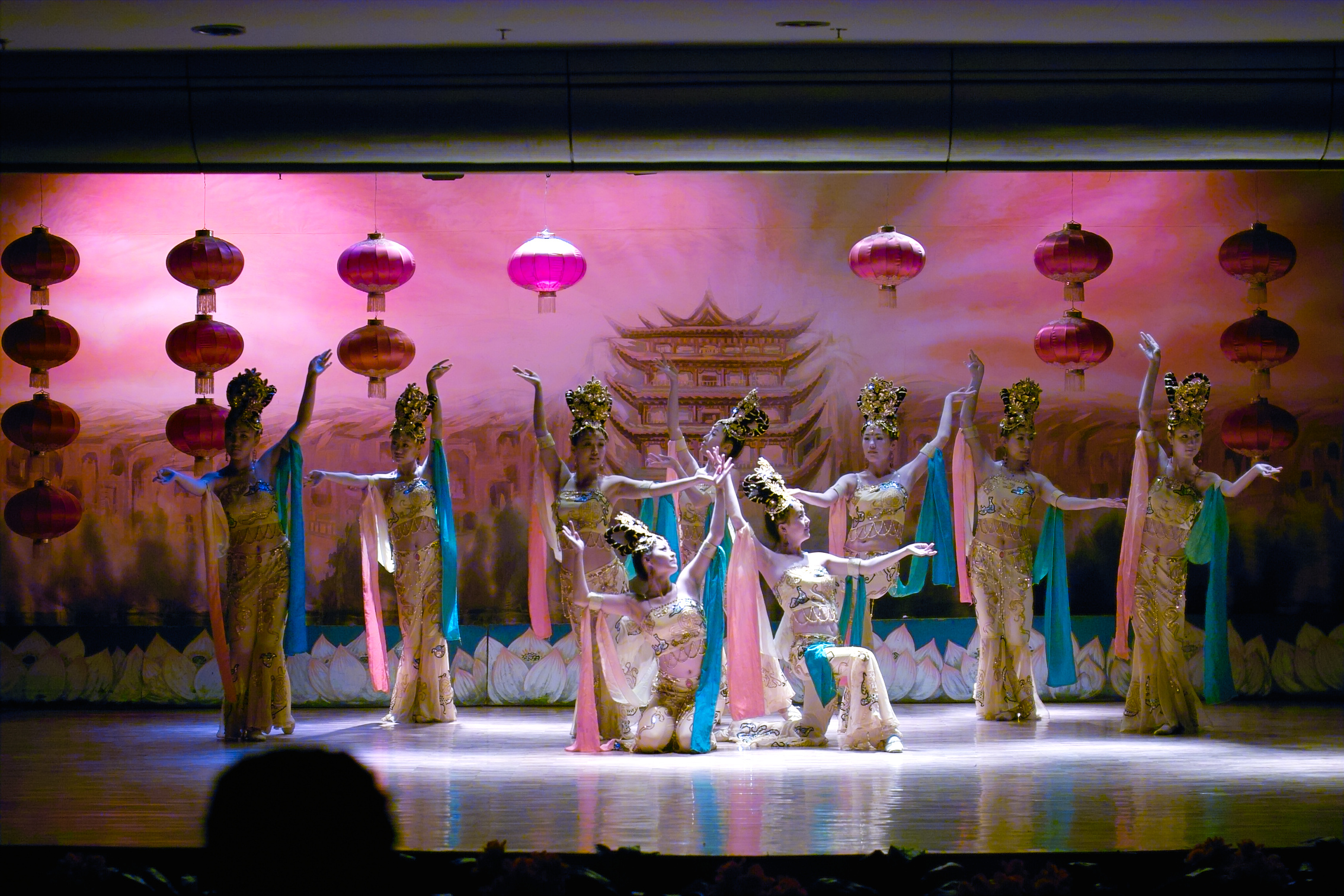
- Dunhuang dance performance, 2009
- Chinese: 敦煌舞
- Literal meaning: Dunhuang dance
Transcriptions
Standard Mandarin
- Hanyu Pinyin: Dūnhuáng wǔ

Dunhuang dance is a form of Chinese dance which combines traditional culture and modern art. Dunhuang dance draws inspiration from the body movements in the Dunhuang grotto frescoes (such as in the Mogao caves), and the musical instruments and music scores found in Dunhuang, Gansu province, West China. Based on the imagery found in the Mogao Grottoes' cave paintings, the dance features unique hand movements that can be traced back to Indian classical dance forms like the Natyasastra, Bharatanatyam, and Kathakali, showcasing how Indian dance aesthetics were transmitted to western China through historical routes across Bactria and the Tarim Basin.

Dunhuang dance emerged as a separate classical dance form in the 1980s. Today, Dunhuang dance is performed in both academic settings and professional shows, serving as a living testament to the lasting influence of Indian culture on Chinese and wider Asian performing arts. The dance shows the combination of ethnic dance styles from Central and Western China.

== Origins and sources of inspiration ==
Dunhuang dance is inspired by the murals and artistic heritage of the Dunhuang grottoes in the Gansu province of northwestern China. Rooted in the imagery depicted in the cave murals of the Mogao Grottoes, the dance form draws heavily on Buddhist iconography, particularly the representations of "flying apsaras" (feitian) and the "Thousand-Hand Avalokitesvara," both of which reflect the profound influence of Indian Buddhism on Chinese performance arts.

The style is characterized by distinctive hand gestures traceable to Indian classical dance traditions such as the Natyasastra, Bharatanatyam, and Kathakali, reflecting the cultural transmission of dance aesthetics from India into China's western regions via historical routes through Bactria and the Tarim Basin. This cross-cultural exchange is further documented in the murals of Qiuci and the Yungang grottoes.

The Mogao grottoes in Dunhuang houses several form of fine arts such as dance and music. It is filled with many dance images which inspired modern dance artists in China.

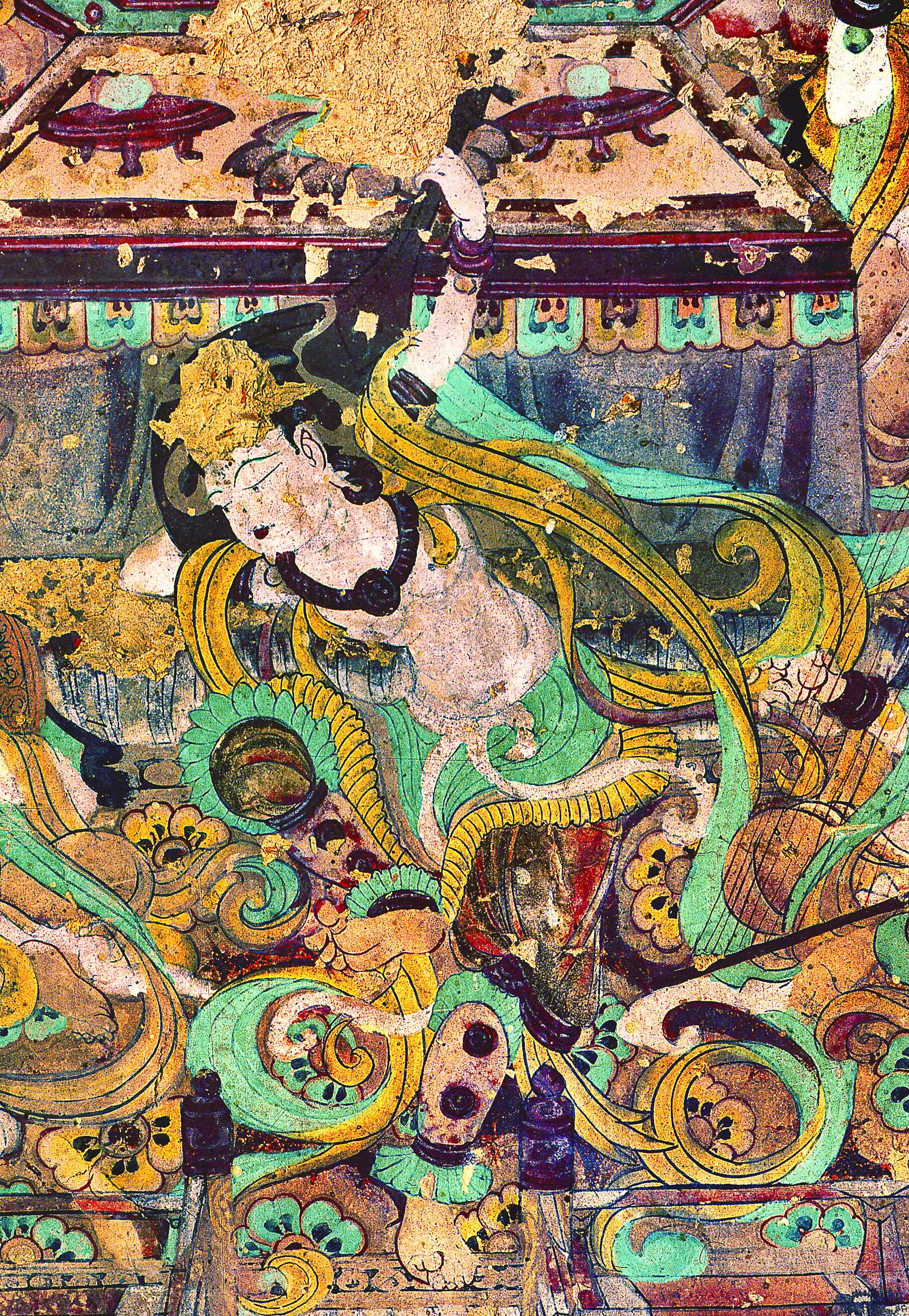
A pipa player playing with the pipa behind his back. Dunhuang, Mogao Caves.

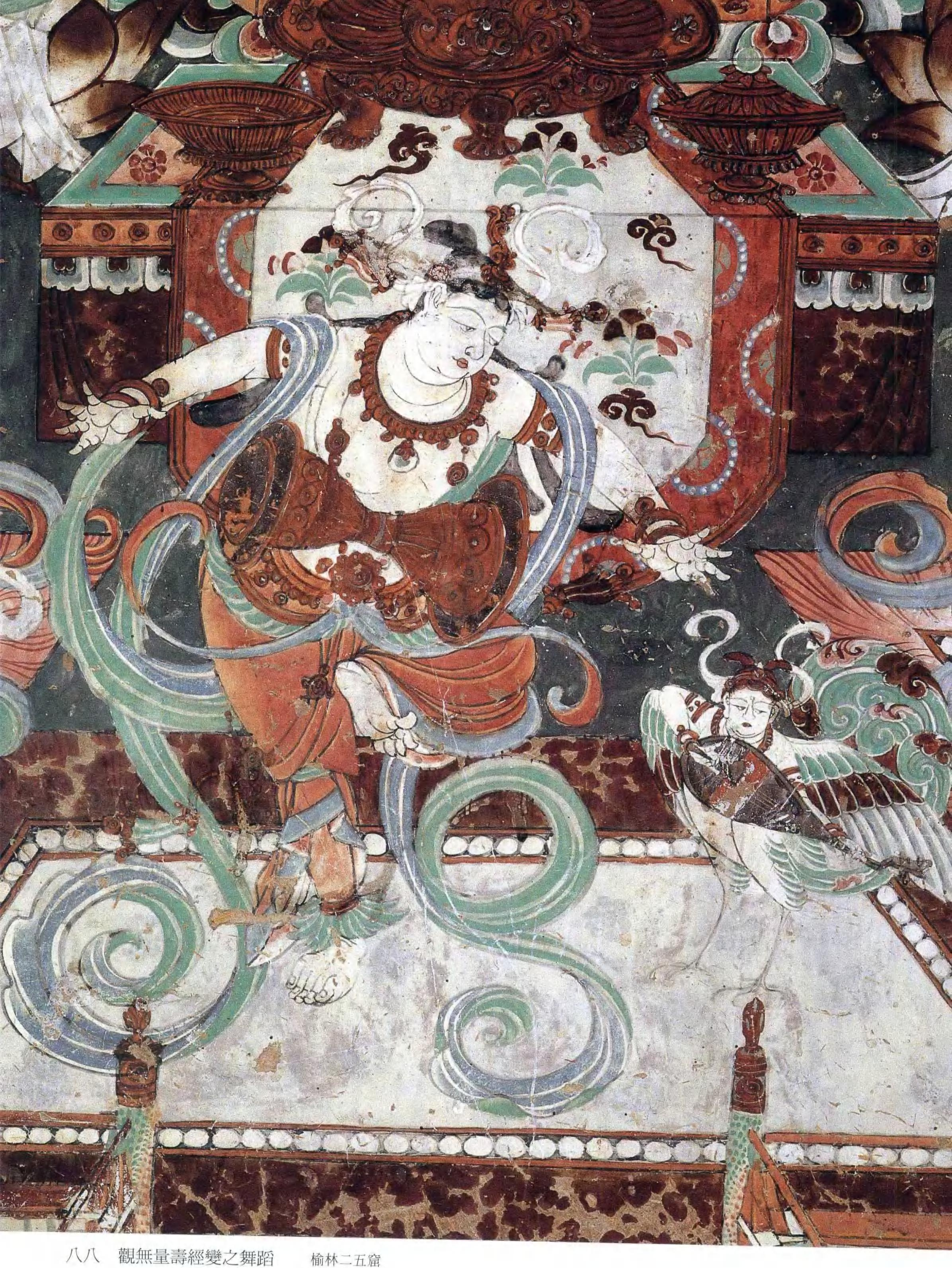
China, mid-Tang Dynasty. Artwork from the Dunhuang Grottos, Yulin Cave number 25 showing a Bird of Life, playing a pipa, with a dancer playing drum

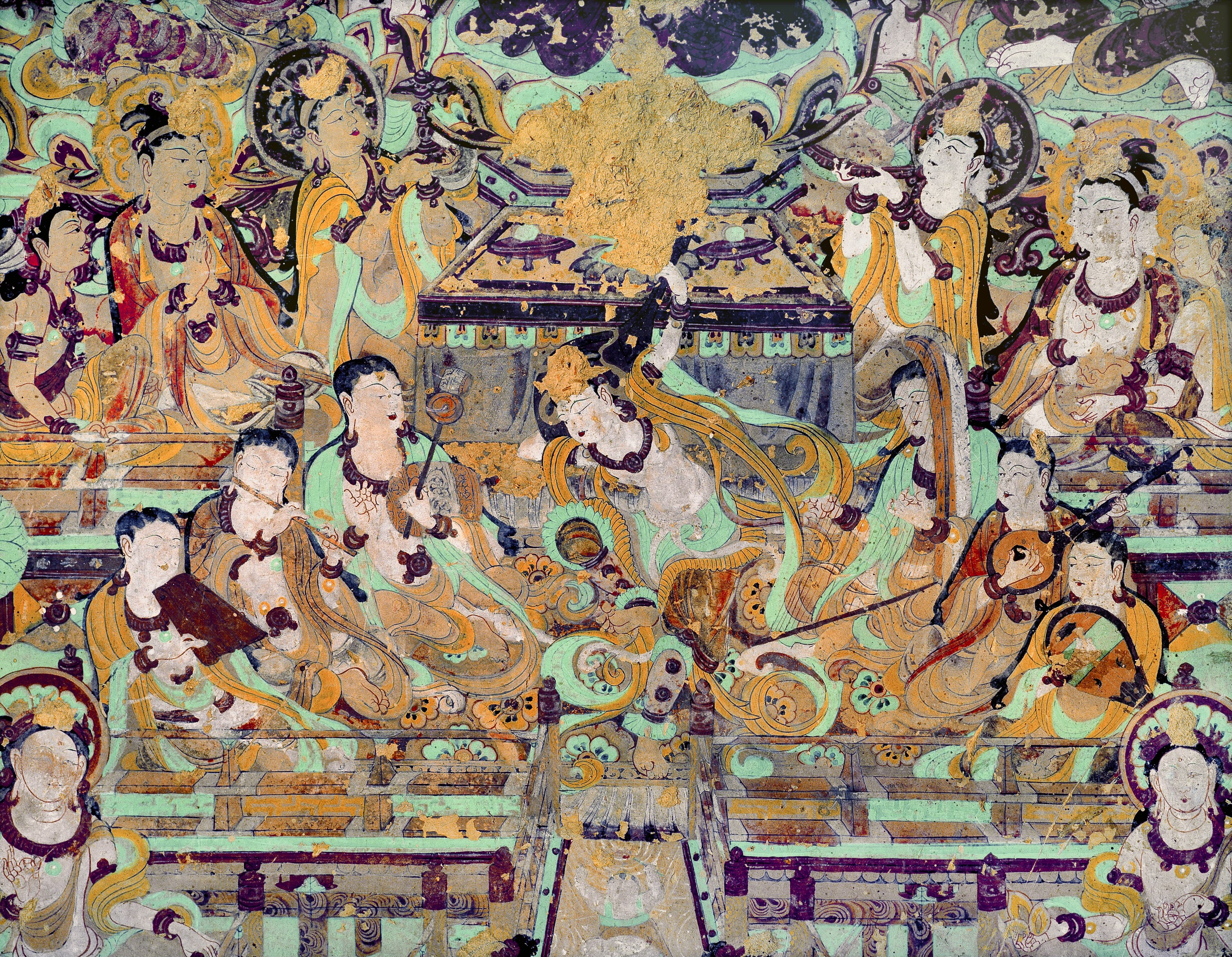
Buddhist cave art, a dancer spins while the orchestra plays. Grotto 46 Left interior wall, second panel. Also called cave 112.

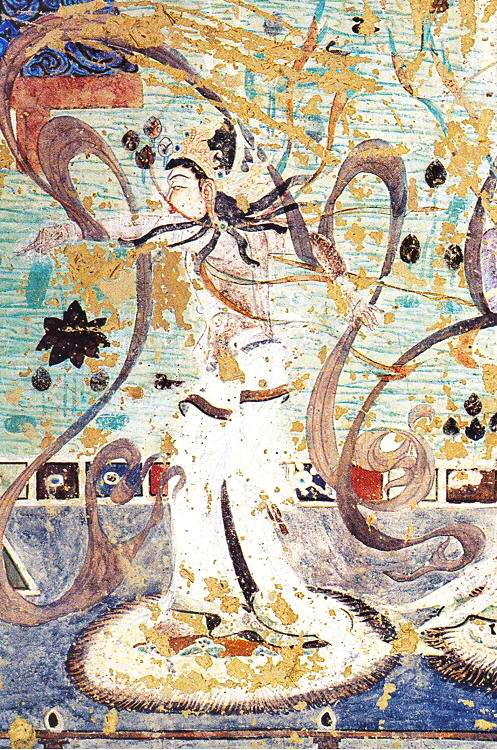
Cave 220 “Hu xuan” dancer in mural from Mogao.

== List of Dunhuang dances ==
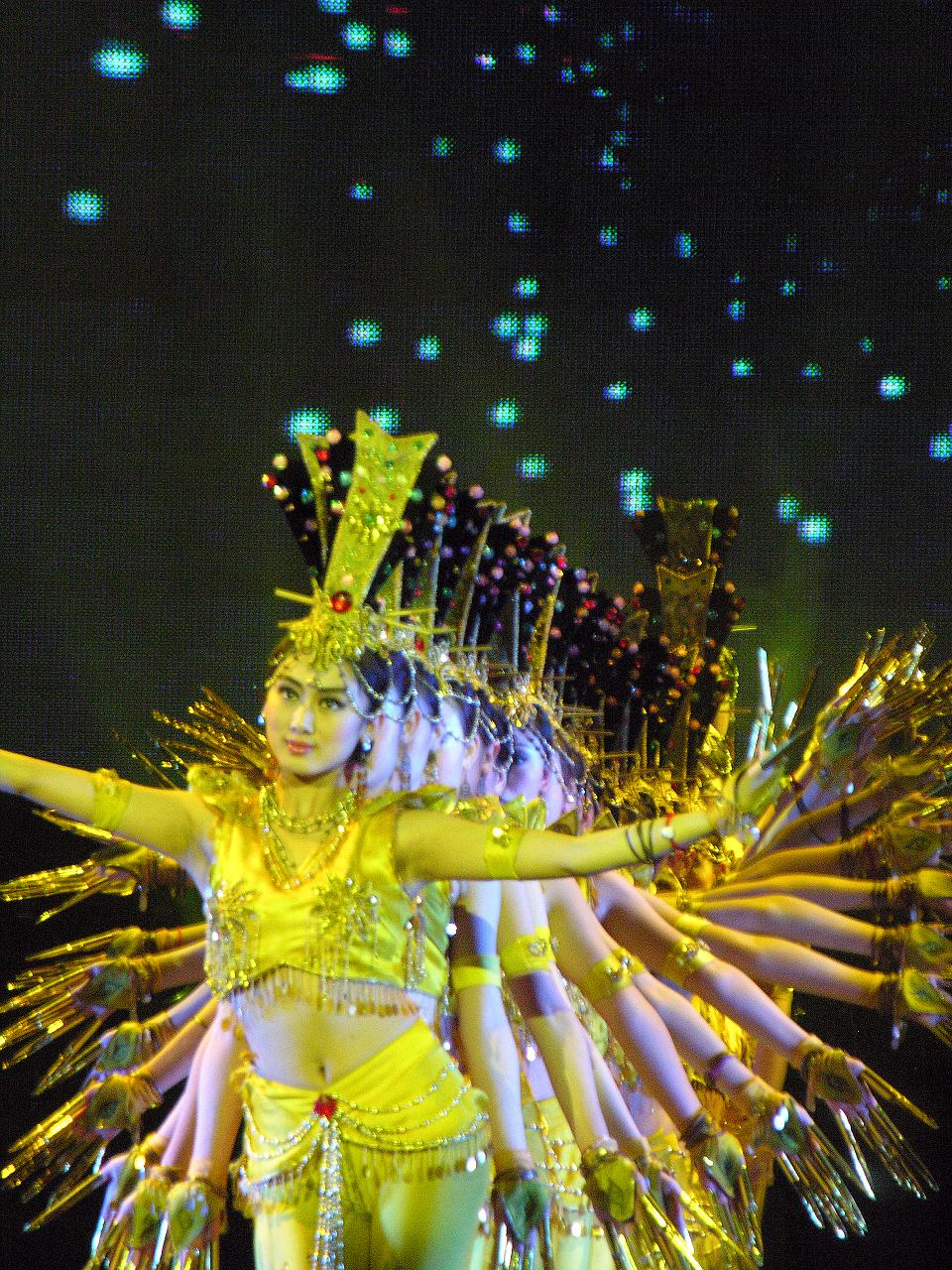
Modern choreography Thousand hand Guanyin

=== Thousand Hand Guanyin ===
It is a contemporary creation produced by the Chinese choreographer Zhang Jigang. It was performed by the China Disabled Performing Art Troupe in which the group dancers are hearing-impaired.

== Other depictions in media ==
- Rain of Flowers Along the Silk Road, a dance drama presented in Beijing on May 23, 1979 by the Gansu Dunhuang Art Academy of China.

== See also ==
- Tang performance arts in Dunhuang
- Dance in China
- List of dance in China
