= Wang Xuejun (dancer) =

Chinese-Australian dancer

Wang Xuejun is an Australian ballet dancer of Chinese descent, as well as a performer of Chinese classical and folk dance. He trained at the Beijing Dance Academy, and has performed as a principal dancer with Australia Sydney Dance Company. More recently he has been a principal dancer and choreographer for the New York-based Shen Yun Performing Arts.

== Biography ==
Wang was born in Beijing, China, in 1963. He was singled out at a young age to train at the Beijing Dance Academy, being selected on the basis of his body conditions, which were deemed ideal for dance. From 1978 to 1984, he performed as a principal dancer with the Guangzhou Ballet and then the Guangdong Dance Theatre.

In 1991, Wang left China and received a humanitarian visa in Australia, later becoming an Australian citizen. After arriving in Australia, Wang performed with the Sydney Festival Ballet. In 1992, he joined the Sydney Dance Company, where he became a principal dancer and performing in productions such as "Black and Blue," "Beauty and the Beast," Trivoli, and Ellipse.

In October 2005, Wang was in Shanghai in a production of the Legend of Mulan with the Sydney Dance Company. During rehearsals, he was arrested by Chinese immigration officials because he had handed literature identified as "pro-democracy" to someone. In his hotel room, authorities also found literature on Falun Gong, a meditation practice that is persecuted in China. Wang and his wife—who is also a professional dancer—have practiced Falun Gong since the mid-1990s. He was deported back to Australia while still in his rehearsal clothes, and was unable to perform in the production.

In 2006 Wang joined Divine Performing Arts (later renamed Shen Yun Performing Arts), making the transition from ballet to traditional Chinese dance. He has performed as a principal dancer in addition to serving as a choreographer. Wang views his role with Shen Yun as being to educate people about traditional Chinese culture: "We try to explore this history in terms of modern society, to let people know how good and beautiful our culture truly is.
