= Vasil Dokev =

Bulgarian artist

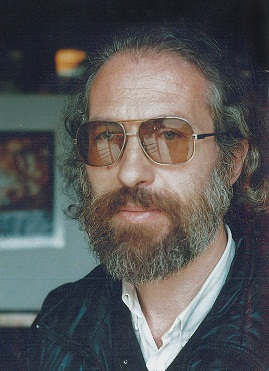
- Born: May 22, 1938; Sofia, Bulgaria
- Died: June 23, 2017; Sofia, Bulgaria
- Known for: Painter

Vasil Dokev (sometimes spelled Vassil Dokev; Bulgarian: Васил Докев; 22 May 1938 - 23 June 2017) was a Bulgarian artist. He worked in the field of abstract painting, Bulgarian folklore stage and costume design, theater stage and costume design and graphic design.

== Biography ==
Vasil Dokev was born in Sofia and graduated the National Academy of Art, Sofia, Bulgaria in 1971.

At the beginning of his career he worked mainly in the field of poster design, logo design and calligraphy. Most of his works from this period were for The National Musical Theater in Sofia, where he worked as a graphic designer from 1971 to 1980. During those years Dokev started working as a costume and stage designer for the National Musical Theater and The National Opera and Ballet in Sofia, Bulgaria. He also created stage and costume designs for many other theaters and ballet companies in Bulgaria such as Arabesque Contemporary Dance Company. In 1973 he was invited to create his first folklore stage design for the Bulgarian performance group Pirin Folk Ensemble. That marked the beginning of his interest in ethno-art and folklore which influenced his work for the rest of his life.

For the last decades of his life Dokev worked mostly in the field of painting. Dokev's paintings are abstract and symbolic. They are also based on artistic principles present in Bulgarian and contemporary ethno-art. He participated group and solo exhibitions in many countries. His paintings are now part of the collection of Sofia City Art Gallery and in private collections in Bulgaria, Italy, France, Switzerland, Belgium, Denmark, the United States, and other countries.
