= Classical dance =

Classical dance may refer to:

- Ballet, particularly classical ballet
- Indian classical dance
- Traditional forms of dancing in other cultures, such as Japanese traditional dance or Chinese traditional dance

== See also ==
- Ballroom dance
