= Dance in China =

Aspect of Chinese culture

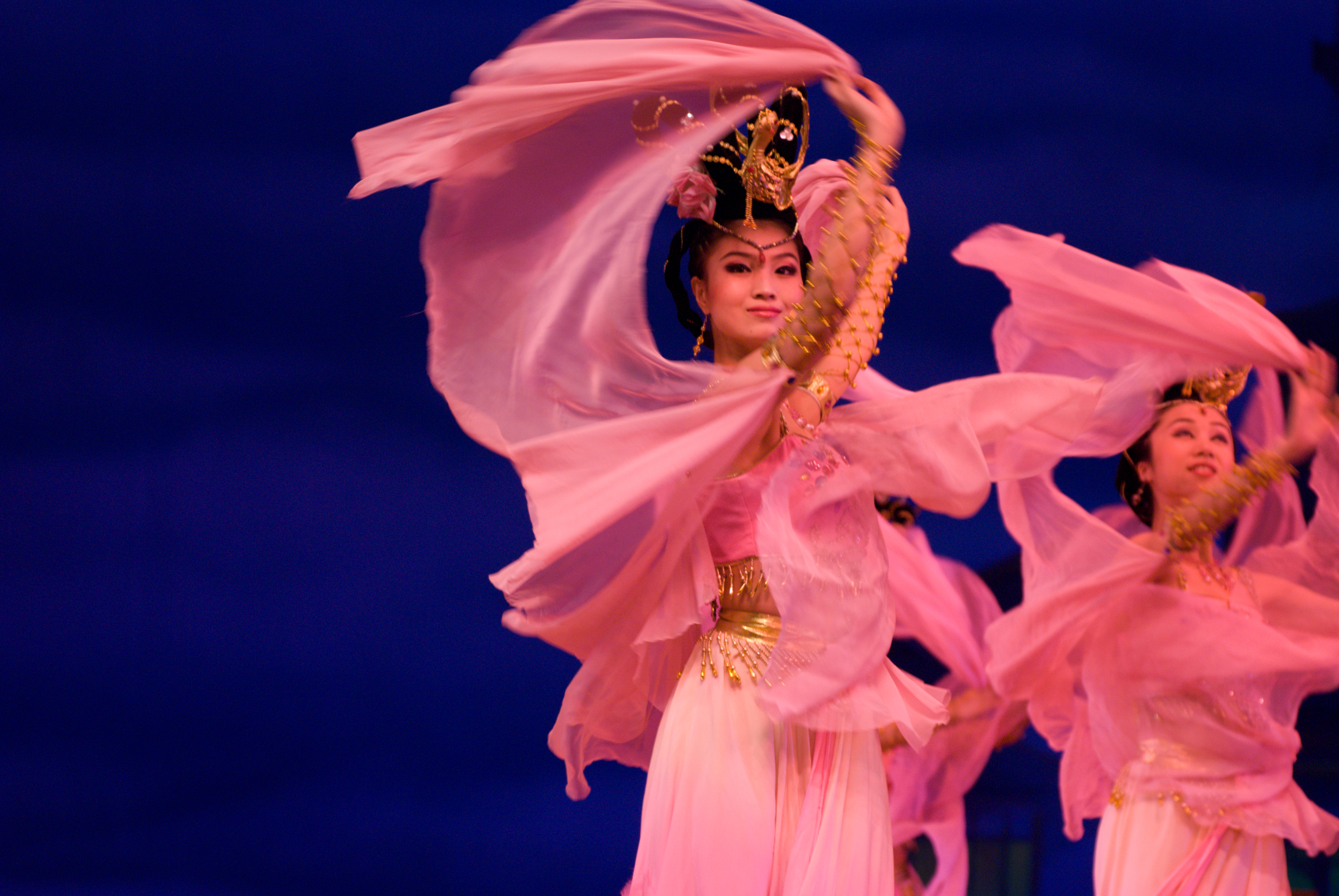
A Chinese dance

Dance in China is a highly varied art form, consisting of many modern and traditional dance genres. The dances cover a wide range, from folk dances to performances in opera and ballet, and may be used in public celebrations, rituals, and ceremonies. There are also 56 officially recognized ethnic groups in China, and each ethnic minority group in China also has its own folk dances. Outside of China, the best-known Chinese dances today are the dragon dance and the lion dance.

== History ==
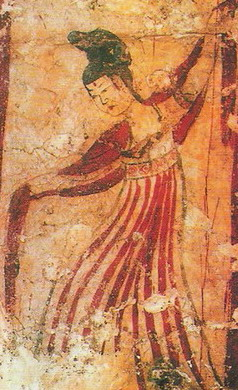
A Tang dynasty dancer from a mural unearthed in Xi'an dancing with a shawl

There is a long recorded history of various forms of dance in China. The earliest Chinese character for "dance" (舞),, written in the oracle bones, is itself a representation of a dancer holding oxtails in each hand. Some Chinese dances today, such as dancing with long sleeves, have been recorded since the very early periods, dating from at least as early as the Zhou dynasty. The most important dances of the early period were the ritual and ceremonial music and dances called yayue, and these dances were performed at the imperial court until the Qing dynasty, but only survive today as performances in Confucian ceremonies.

The imperial court from the Qin dynasty onward established various departments responsible for the collection of music and dances, training of performers as well as their performances at the court, such as the Music Bureau and Royal Academy. During the Six Dynasties era (220-589 CE), there were strong influences from Central Asia in music and dance. The art of dance reached a peak in the Tang dynasty, and the dances of the period were highly diverse and cosmopolitan, dances from Central Asia, in particular, were popular. A great number of dances were recorded in the Tang dynasty. For example, there are over 60 Grand Compositions alone, which are large-scale performances from the Tang court, and there were tens of thousands of musicians and dancers at the Imperial palaces.

Dance as an independent art form, however, declined after the Tang dynasty. Dance began to be absorbed into Chinese opera that started to take shape in the Song and Yuan dynasties, replacing the song and dance of Sui and Tang. Furthermore, from the Song dynasty onwards, the practice of footbinding, which may have first arisen from dancers themselves, became increasingly popular, which limited the movements of women when the binding became tighter, and famous female dancers became increasingly rare after the Song dynasty. Greater social restrictions placed on women may have also led to the virtual elimination of female dancers by the Qing dynasty. Dance as a separate performance art largely survived in folk traditions. In more recent times, the art of dance in China has enjoyed a resurgence, and modern developments in Chinese dances are continuing apace.

== Traditional dances ==
Many of the traditional Chinese dances have a long history. These may be folk dances, or dances that were once performed as rituals or as an entertainment spectacle, and some may have been performed in the imperial court. Among the best-known of the Chinese traditional dances are the dragon dance and lion dance, and both dances were known in earlier dynasties in various forms. A form of lion dance similar to today's lion dance was described as early as the Tang dynasty, the modern form of the dragon dance, however, may be a more recent development.

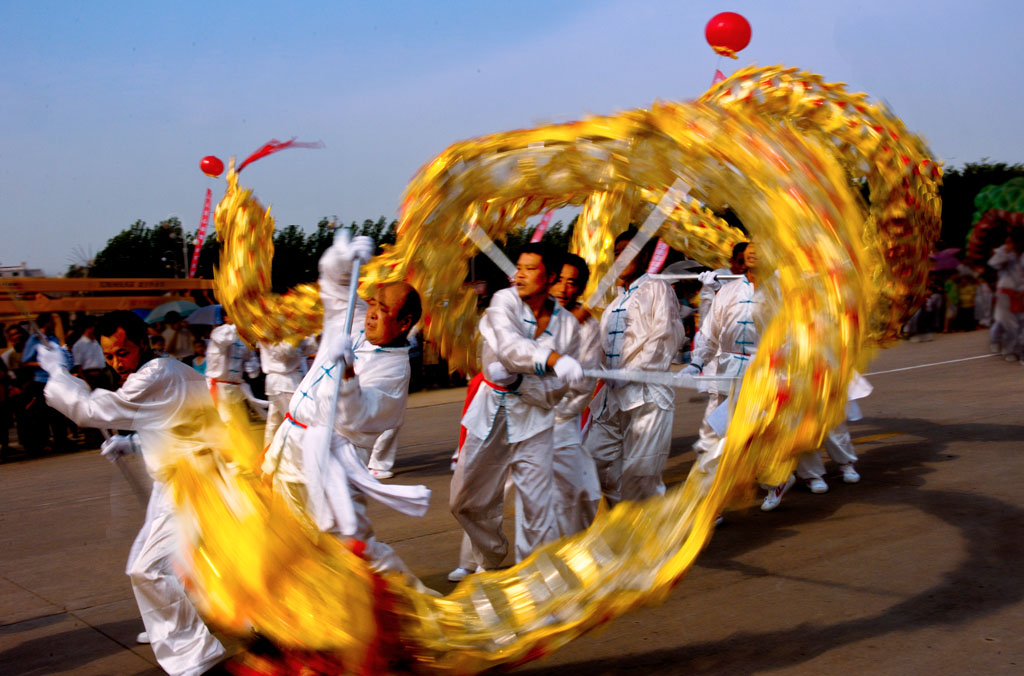
Dragon dance

In some of the earliest dances recorded in China, dancers may have dressed as animal and mythical beasts, and during the Han dynasty, some forms of the dragon dance were mentioned. The dragon dances of the Han dynasty, however, do not resemble the modern form of the dance. Dragon dances mentioned include a dance performed during a ritual to appeal for rain at a time of drought as the Chinese dragon was associated with rain, acts in the baixi variety shows where performers dressed up as a green dragon playing a flute, and acts where fish turned into a dragon. Modern dragon dance uses a light-weight structure manipulated by a dozen or so men using poles at regular intervals along the length of the dragon, and some forms of the dragon can be very long and involve hundreds of performers. There are more than 700 different dragon dances in China.

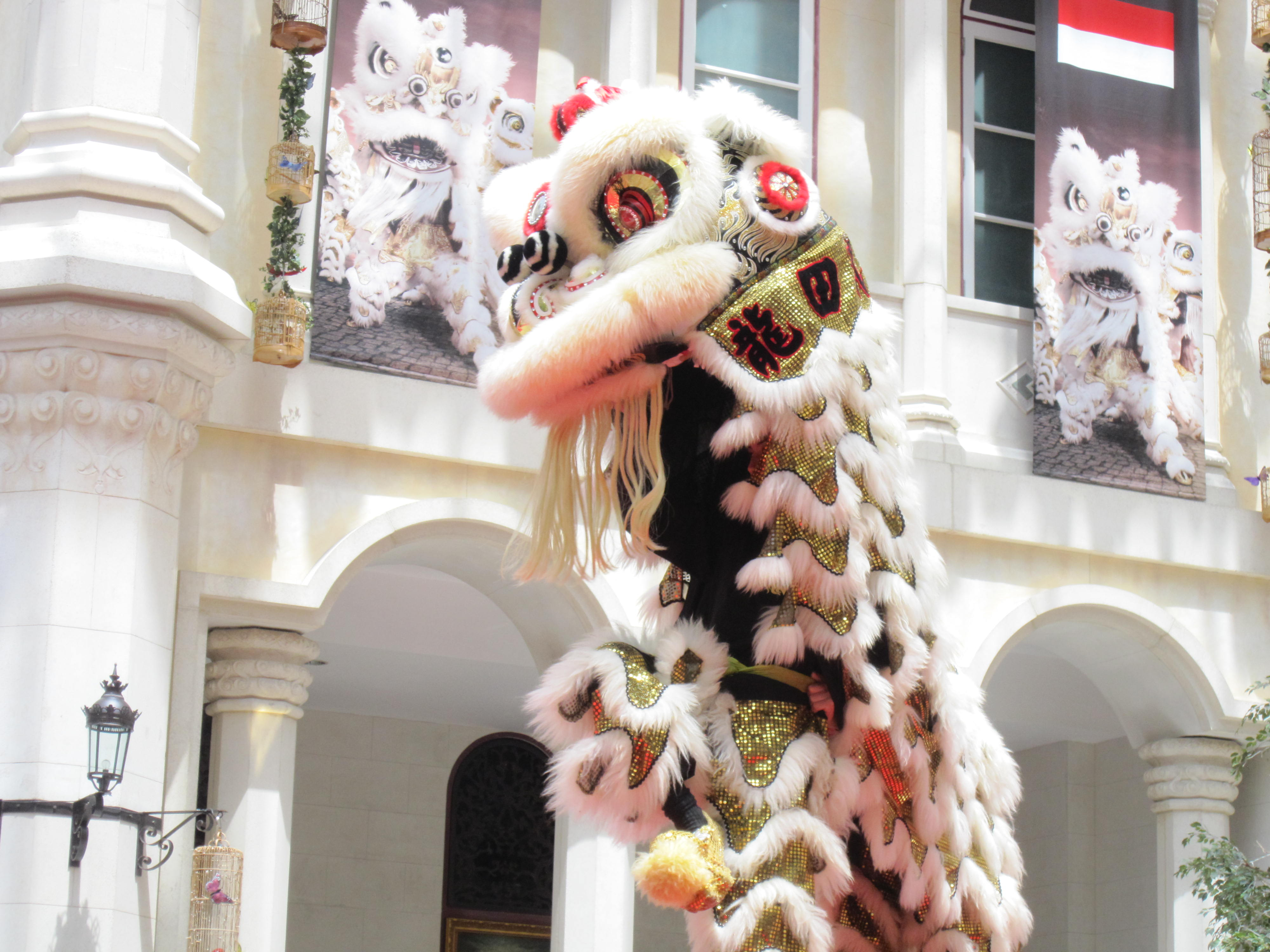
A lion dance

The lion dance has been suggested to have been introduced from outside China as the lion is not native to China. Suggested origins of the dance include India and Persia, although some have also proposed a native Chinese origin. A detailed description of a lion dance appeared during the Tang dynasty and it was then recognized as a foreign import, but the dance may have existed in China as early as the third century AD. During the Northern and Southern dynasties, it had association with Buddhism. A version of lion dance resembling the modern lion dance was described by Tang poet Bai Juyi in his poem "Western Liang Arts" (西凉伎), where the dancers wear a lion costume made of a wooden head, a silk tail and furry body, with eyes gilded with gold and teeth plated with silver, and ears that move. There are two main forms of Chinese Lion Dance: the Northern Lion and Southern Lion. A form of the Lion Dance is also found in Tibet, where it is called the Snow Lion Dance.

=== Folk dances of Han Chinese ===
Folk dances are important historically in the development of dance in China. Some of the earliest dances in court rituals and ceremonies may have evolved from folk dances. Rulers from various dynasties collected folk dances, many of which eventually became court dances. However, at various times, there had also been antipathy towards some folk dances and some emperors attempted to ban them.

Many of the folk dances are related to harvest and hunting and the ancient gods associated with them. For example, the Constellation Dance was performed to procure as much seed grain as there are stars in the sky, while the Harpoon Dance was associated with Fuxi who, according to the mythology, gave the Han people fish net, and the Plough Dance was connected to Shennong, the god of agriculture.

Some examples of Chinese folk dances:

- Yangge (秧歌) - a dance that is common in Northern China.
- Lantern Dance - a dance found in Southern China.
- Errenzhuan (二人转)- a dance from Northeast China.

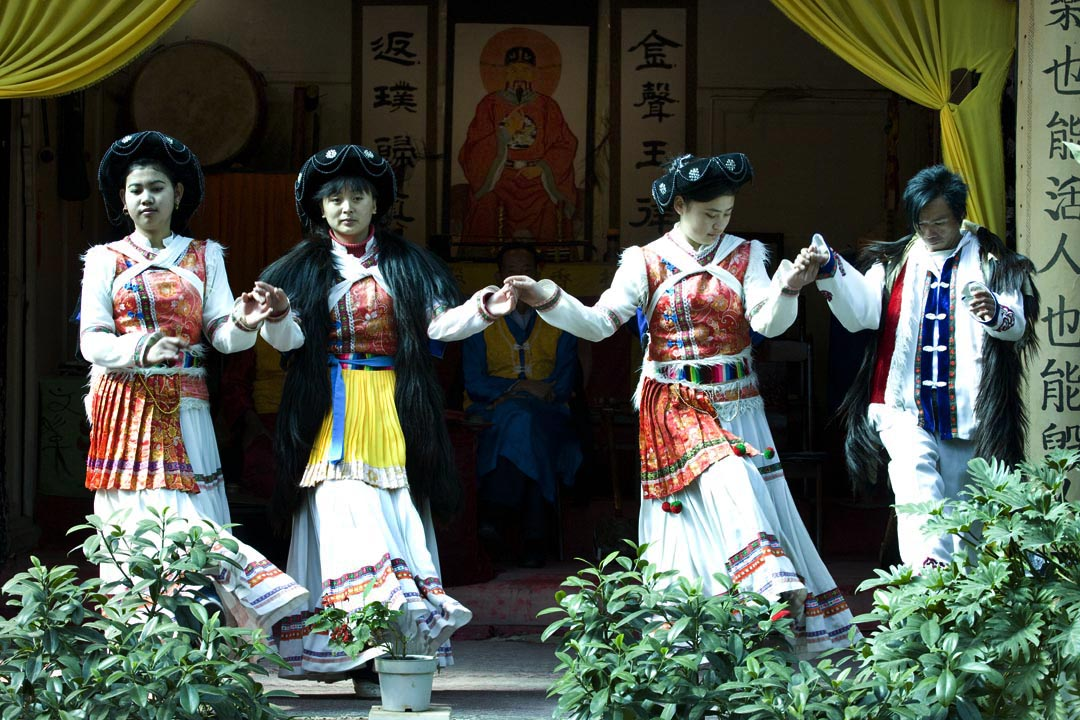
Folk dance from a minority group in China

=== Dances of ethnic minorities in China ===
There are 56 ethnic groups in China, and each ethnic group has its own dance with ethnic characteristics, thus interpreting their local culture, lifestyle, and ethnic customs in the dance. In addition to daily life, every ethnic group likes to express their inner feeling the most by dancing. Every time there is a festival, people will gather together to express the joy in everyone's heart in the form of dance. Therefore, dance can effectively convey the emotions of different groups of people.

A few examples of their dances:

- Baishou Dance - a dance of the Tujia people.
- Mongolian Bowl Dance (頂碗舞) - a dance where female dancers balance several bowls on their heads while dancing.
- Long Drum Dance (長鼓舞) - a dance of the Yao people, which inspired the orchestral composition Dance of the Yao People.
- Sanam – a Uyghur dance.
- Lhamo – a Tibetan opera with dancing and singing.

=== Dance in theatre ===
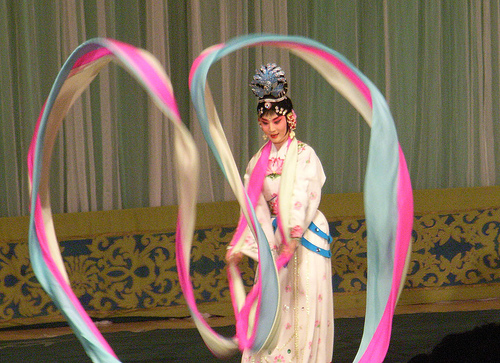
Dance as part of the Peking Opera in a performance of "Heavenly Lady Scatters Flowers" (天女散花)

In the entertainment centres, called wazi during the Song dynasty, various theatrical forms flourished and Chinese opera began to take shape, and dance started to become merged into opera. Dances such as "Dance Judgement" (舞判, also called the Dance of Zhong Kui, 跳鐘馗) became opera pieces in the Ming dynasty, as well as dances of the Song dynasty such as Flapping the Flag (撲旗子). Other dances found in opera include the Sword Dance. Chinese opera became very popular by the Yuan dynasty, and dances became absorbed into opera over the following centuries.

=== Ritual dance ===
Most early records of dances in China were ritual or ceremonial dances, and these dances formed the yayue, which were considered to be of great importance in the court. These dances have largely disappeared from modern Han Chinese culture, although ritual dances are still found in some folk traditions and the cultures of ethnic minorities in China.

- Yi Dance (佾舞, literally "row dance") was originally a court dance, but adopted to form part of a Confucian ceremony. This ancient dance may be performed with rows of dancers holding pheasant feathers and red flutes in a square formation (Civil dance) or they may hold a shield and a battleaxe (Military Dance). The tradition of dancing while holding items such as feather plumes dated back to the Shang dynasty. The most important ceremony is performed with 8 rows of 8 dancers (the Eight Yi Dance, 64 dancers in all). Originally, dances were only performed in 6 rows of dancers (36 dancers in all) in Confucian temples as 8 rows were restricted to the Imperial court, but permission was later granted to perform the 8-row dance as well on the basis that he was given the title of a king by an emperor. Modernized versions of such performances are presented for tourists at the Confucian temple in Qufu. This Confucian dance is also performed in Taiwan and Korea.
- Nuo Dances (儺舞) – a dance with masks which may be performed in Nuo opera or as rituals during festivals to drive away evil spirits.
- Cham dance – a Tibetan Buddhist dance

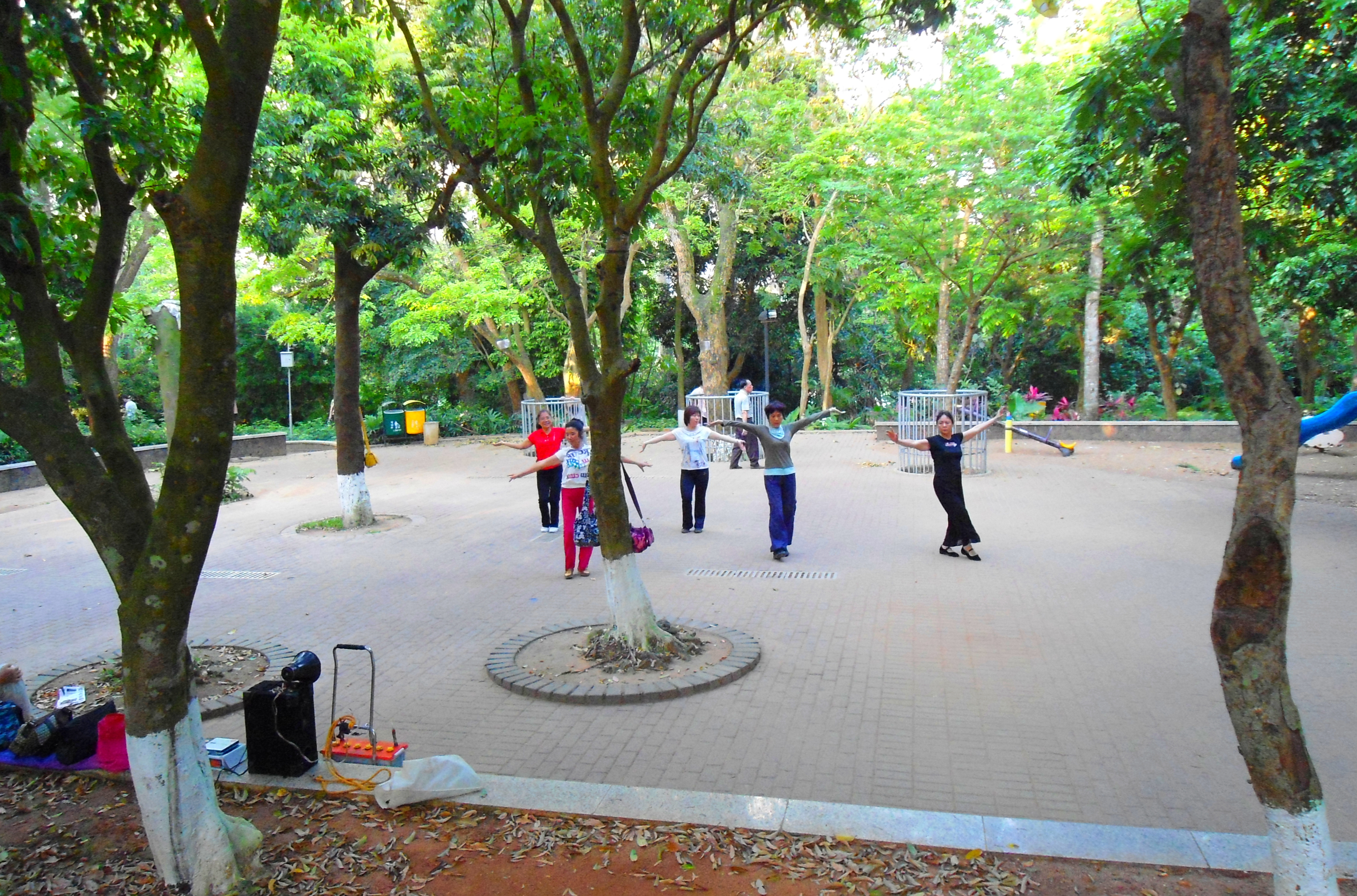
Dancing in park as exercise

=== Exercise dance ===
According to Lüshi Chunqiu, during the time of Emperor Yao, a dance was created as an exercise for the people to keep healthy after a prolonged spell of wet weather. Traditionally, some Chinese dances may also have a connection with the martial arts that were used to train fighting skills as well as for fitness, and some martial art exercises such as Tai chi or Qigong are similar to a choreographed dance. In modern China, it is common to find people using dance as a form of exercise in parks.

=== Dance troupe ===
- China National Ethnic Song and Dance Ensemble

== Modern and Western dances ==
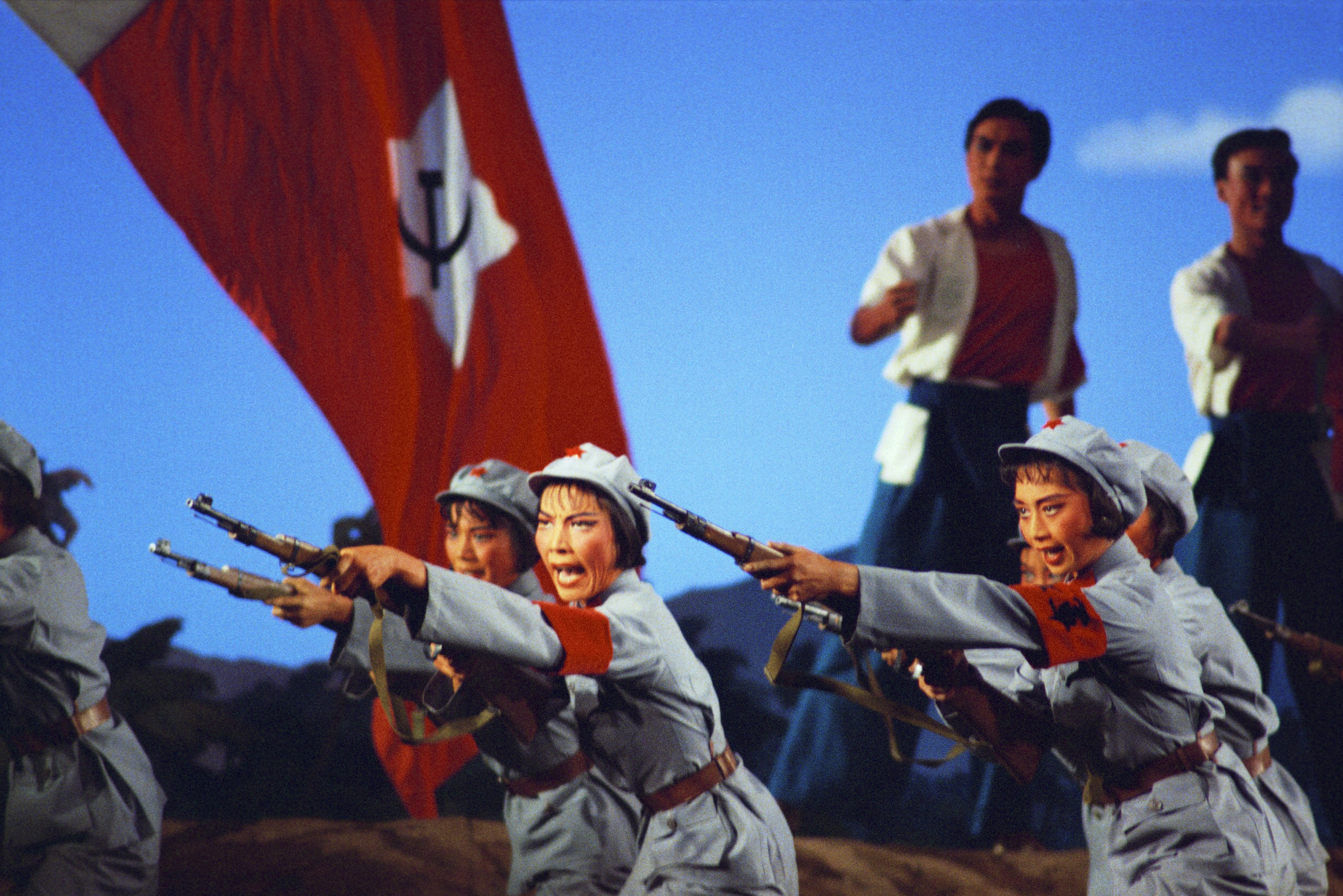
1972 production of The Red Detachment of Women by the National Ballet of China

=== Ballet ===
The first ballet school in China, Beijing Dance School, was established in 1954 with Dai Ailian as the principal and was staffed by some outstanding Russian teachers, including Pyotr Gusev, who instituted the Russian training system. In the following years, ballets such as Swan Lake and Romeo and Juliet were performed; wuju, a form that blended ballet and traditional influences, also emerged during this period. The National Ballet of China was founded on the last day of 1959 as the Experimental Ballet Company of the Beijing Dance School. During the Cultural Revolution under the control of Madame Mao, Revolutionary Model dramas came to the fore, and the repertory was eventually reduced to two ideological ballets – The Red Detachment of Women and The White Haired Girl. After the fall of the Gang of Four, the ballet company began to reform and change direction with the classical Western ballets resurrected, and also broadened its range to include more modern ballets from around the world.

Other ballet companies in China:

- Shanghai Ballet Company
- Guangzhou Ballet
- Hong Kong Ballet
- Liaoning Ballet
- Suzhou Ballet
- Tianjin Ballet

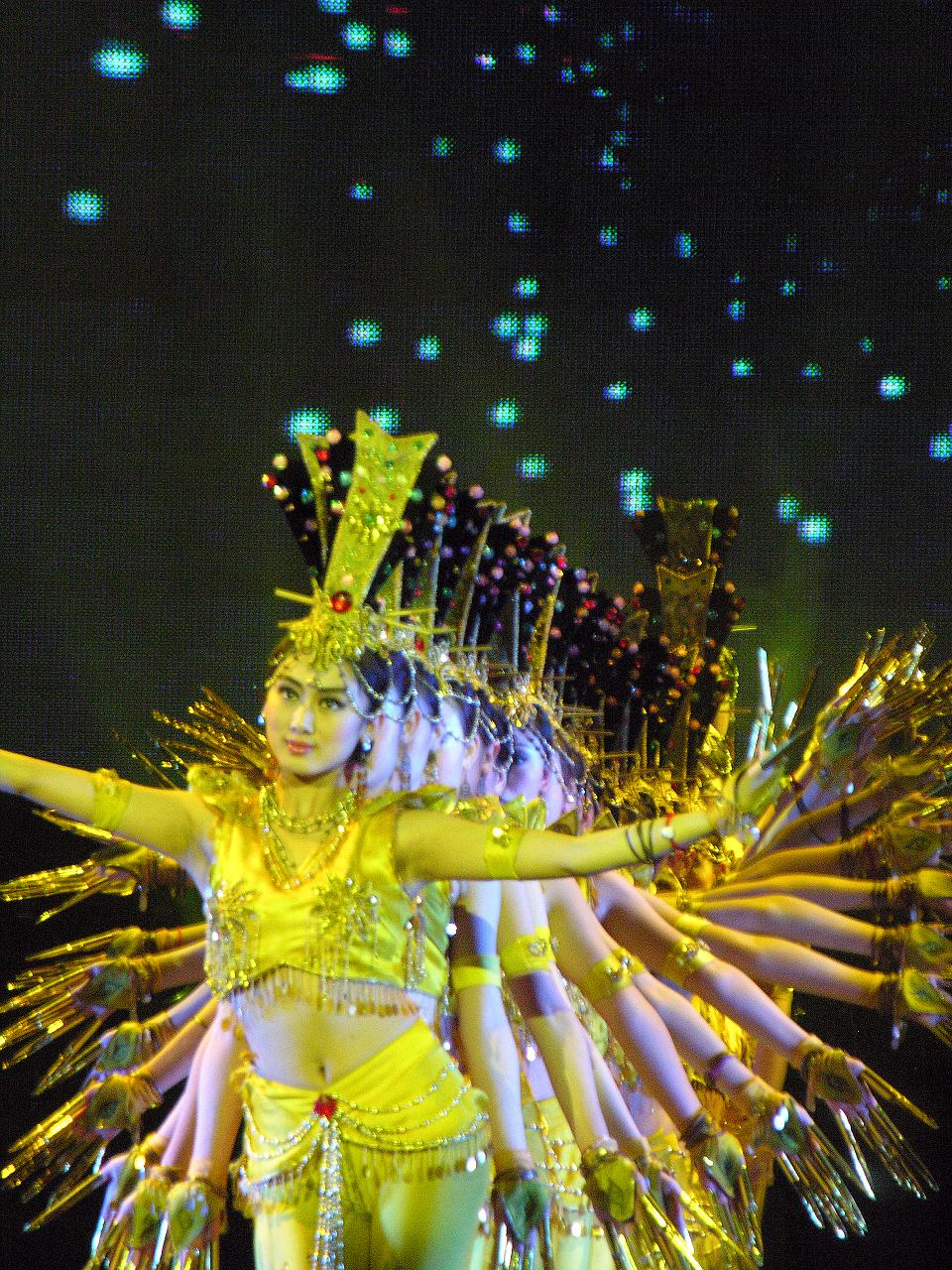
Modern choreography on traditional themes – this dance, popularly known as the ''Thousand Hand Bodhisattva'', is inspired by representations of the bodhisattva Guanyin. In Buddhist iconography, multiple arms are commonly symbolize the bodhisattva' s ability to assist numerous beings rather than a specific number. In performance, the visual effect of "thousands of hands hands" is created through the synchronized movements of multiple dancers arranged in formation.

=== Contemporary dance ===
- Beijing Modern Dance Company
- City Contemporary Dance Company in Hong Kong
- Guangdong Modern Dance Company
- Living Dance Studio in Beijing

Most professional folk and classical dance forms in China are inspired by tradition but are actually modern interpretations. Many dances presented as traditional in theaters and television are modern imaginations of ancient dances using modern choreography, for example, the famous Rainbow-Feathered Dress Dance of the Tang dynasty.

- Dunhuang dance – modern composition inspired by frescos from the Dunhuang caves.

==== Chinese classical dance ====
Chinese classical dance, despite its name, is a relatively new art form that originated in the early 1950s. According to Emily Wilcox, a professor of Chinese studies at the University of Michigan, it is a "predominant" dance within modern Chinese art that emerged from a nationalistic drive to create a dance form that could authentically represent China. Drawing inspiration from 1920s Chinese opera scenes, historical art objects and numerous regional folk performances, dancers developed a new tradition. Wilcox stated that Chinese dancers emphasize that Chinese classical dance is an "artistic innovation" and that they remain interested in developing new themes from Chinese history and cultural diversity, as well as exploring the "possibility of newness", rather than simply preserving and recreating the same traditions.

==== Social dances ====
Western ballroom dancing (Chinese: 交谊舞) became popular in the 20th century. Previously, it would not have been permissible for men and women from respectable families to dance together. It was popular in the 1940s Shanghai nightclubs, and early Communists leaders such as Mao Zedong and Zhou Enlai were also avid Soviet-style ballroom dancers. Ballroom dancing, however, later disappeared after the Cultural Revolution, to be replaced by massive group dances such as the yangge dance. Ballroom dances, however, reappeared after the liberalization of China later in the century, and it is now commonly found performed by many people in public parks in the morning as exercise.

== Dance school ==
- Beijing Dance Academy
- Minzu University of China College of Dance
- People's Liberation Army Academy of Art

== See also ==
- List of dance in China
