= Chai Folk Ensemble =

Canadian Israeli folk dance ensemble

The Chai Folk Ensemble, from Winnipeg, Manitoba, Canada is North America's oldest and largest Israeli folk dance ensemble. Founded in 1964 by the late dancer Sarah Sommer, Chai has built an international reputation for international dance, music, and song. "Chai" is the Hebrew word for "alive".

Chai is made up of more than 40 dancers, singers, and musicians. It is believed that Chai is the only Israeli folk ensemble in North America to perform exclusively to live musical accompaniment.

In 1963, a Hebrew teacher at Winnipeg's Talmud Torah school named Leon Berger decided to have his grade 4 class put on a Purim play. Mr. Berger knew a vivacious dance instructor named Sarah Sommer and invited her to choreograph the play. It was a big hit, especially the dance routines, and over the following months Sarah continued to teach dance to the girls she met from Mr. Berger's grade 4 class. By the next year, 1964, more dancers had joined and the Chai Folk Ensemble was born.

Over the years, Chai's repertoire has included music and dance from parts of the world where Jewish culture has existed including Israel, Yemen, Morocco, Spain, Greece, Russia, Poland, Brazil, and Africa.

== See also ==
- List of folk dance performance groups
