= List of dance in China =

This is a list of dance in China.

Category	Subtype	Description	Period	Ethnicity	Region	Pictures
Dunhuangwu (敦煌舞; Dunhuang dance)	Dunhuang Feitian dance (敦煌飞天舞)		Present			
Dunhuangwu (敦煌舞; Dunhuang dance)	Thousand hand Guanyin (千手觀音)		2004 – Present			
Errenzhuan (二人轉)		Derived from farmers' dances which were performed to celebrate sowing and planting. It features folk dance technique of waving fans or silk handkerchiefs.	Present		Northeast China (Liaoning, Jilin, and Heilongiiang)	
Guangchangwu (广场舞; lit. "Square dancing")			1990s –Present			
Huadeng (花燈)	Yunnan flower lantern (云南花灯)				Yunnan	
Huadeng (花燈)	Yi people's flower-drum dance		1898 –Present	Yi	Eshan Yi Autonomous County, Yunnan Province	
Huagudeng wu (花鼓灯舞; lit. "Flower drum lantern dance")			Song –Present	Han Chinese	Huai River Valley (eastern China)	
Jianwu (剑舞; lit. "Sword dance")			Present	Han Chinese		
Kongquewu (孔雀舞)	Dai Peacock dance (傣族孔雀舞)		Han –Present	Dai		
Mukamu (木卡姆; lit. "Muqam dance")			Present	Uyghur		
Sanwu (伞舞; lit. "Umbrella dance")			Han –Present			
Shanziwu (扇子舞; lit. "Chinese fan dance")			Han –Present	Han Chinese		
Shuixiuwu (水袖舞; lit. "Water sleeve dance")			Zhou –Present	Han Chinese		
Wulong (舞龙; lit. "Dragon dance") or Long wu (龍舞)			Han –Present	Han Chinese		
Wushi (舞狮) or Shiziwu (獅子舞)	Southern Lion dance		Present	Han Chinese		
Wushi (舞狮) or Shiziwu (獅子舞)	Northern Lion dance		Present	Han Chinese		
Wushi (舞狮) or Shiziwu (獅子舞)	Heavenly Tower Lion Dance (天塔狮舞; Tianta shiwu)		Present	Han Chinese		
Tea dance	Tea picking dance (採茶舞; Caicha wu)		Present		Fujian	
Tea dance	Tea lantern dance		Present			
Yangge (秧歌; lit. 'Rice Sprout Song'); also known as yangko			Song –Present	Han Chinese	Northern China	
Yangge derivatives	Hongchou wu (紅綢舞; lit. "Red Silk Dance ")	An iconic dance which shows the combination of Northeast Great Yangge (東北大秧歌; Dongbei da yangge)	1950s	Han Chinese	Northern China	
Yangge derivatives	Paolü (跑驢; Running Donkey)	Uses techniques of the Hebei Earth Yangge (Hebei di yangge; 河北地秧歌)	1950s	Han Chinese	Northern China	
Yayue (雅乐, lit "elegant music)		Classical music and dance performed at the royal court and temples in ancient China	Western Zhou	Han Chinese		

== See also ==
- Dance in China
- History of Chinese dance
