= Rain of Flowers Along the Silk Road =

1979 Chinese dance drama

- Native title
- Traditional Chinese: 絲路花雨
- Simplified Chinese: 丝路花雨
Transcriptions
Standard Mandarin
- Hanyu Pinyin: Sī lù huā yǔ
- Premiere: 23 May 1979
- Genre: Dance drama

Rain of Flowers Along the Silk Road (simplified Chinese: 丝路花雨; traditional Chinese: 絲路花雨; pinyin: Sī lù huā yǔ) is a 1979 Chinese dance drama by the Gansu Song and Dance Ensemble. Drawing extensively from the frescoes in the Mogao Caves in its movements and set design, it follows a painter and his daughter over the course of several years as they befriend a Persian merchant and topple a local magistrate.

Developed for the 1979 National Day of the People's Republic of China, Rain of Flowers Along the Silk Road was lauded upon its debut. It was soon brought abroad as part of China's soft power, with performances in more than 20 countries as of 2019. It has been updated several times, with a modified version incorporated into the 2008 Summer Olympics opening ceremony, and spawned a style of dance known as Dunhuang.

== Synopsis ==
A drama in six scenes, Rain of Flowers Along the Silk Road follows the artist Zhang and his daughter Yingniang. Travelling the Silk Road, father and daughter rescue the Persian merchant Yunus from a sandstorm. They are separated, however, after being accosted by bandits.

Several years later, Zhang and Yingniang reunite in Dunhuang, where a captive Yingniang has been serving as a dancing girl. Yunus, passing by, agrees to pay for her freedom. Zhang entrusts Yingniang to him, knowing that the corrupt local magistrate desires to take her as a concubine, and the couple leave for Persia. Enraged, the magistrate imprisons Zhang in the Mogao Caves, where he is forced to paint on the walls.

Years pass, and Yunus and Yingniang plan to return to China. After a dream sequence, Zhang is freed by the Tang governor. Learning that the magistrate seeks to assassinate Yunus, he lights a warning beacon but is killed in the process. Yingniang ultimately reveals the magistrate's crimes through a dance performance. The Silk Road secured, representatives of twenty-seven nations celebrate.

== Production ==
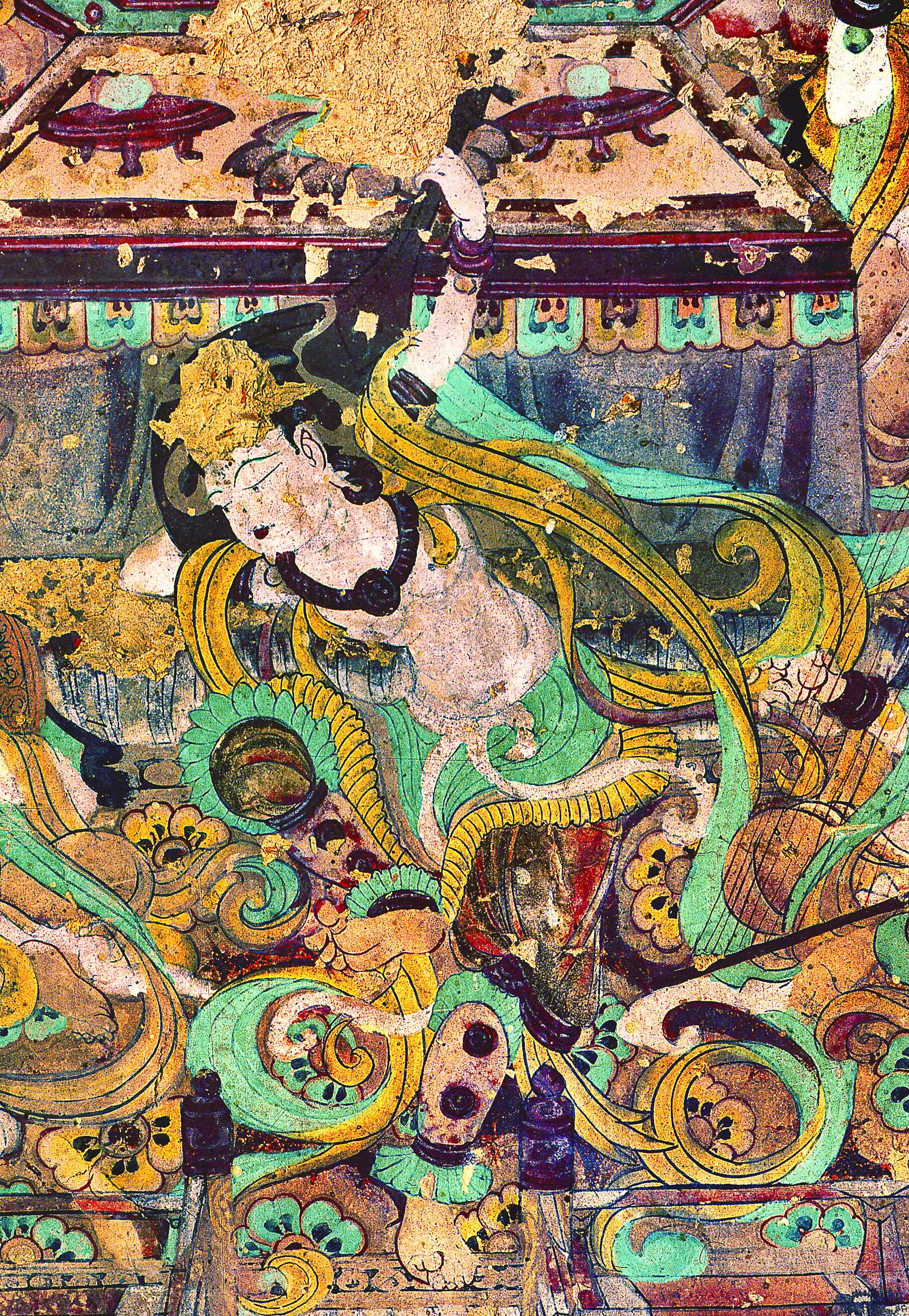
A musician playing a pipa behind her back; this illustration inspired some of Yingnian's movements.

Preparation for Rain of Flowers Along the Silk Road began in June 1978, when the Gansu Song and Dance Ensemble were commissioned to create a new dance drama by the Gansu branch of the Chinese Communist Party for performance during National Day festivities. Initial choreography and scenario preparation continued through July, with the basic structure ready in August 1978.

Drawing on extensive research from the Mogao Caves, which included the copying of paintings from the cave, the story for Rain of Flowers Along the Silk Road was penned by Zhao Zhixun. Choreography was handled by Liu Shaoxiong, Xu Qi, Yan Jianzhong, Zhang Qiang, and Zhu Jiang. Set design was done by Yang Qian, with Hao Hanyi responsible for costumes and Yang Shuyun for makeup. Rehearsals for the show began in February 1979, with Chai Huaimin taking the role of Zhang and He Yanyun as Yingniang.

Inspiration for Rain of Flowers Along the Silk Road came from the Mogao Caves, which contains thousands of paintings and sculptures that date from the 5th through 14th centuries. This artwork, much of it drawn from Buddhist imagery, contains multiple images of people in motion. Elements borrowed from the caves included flying apsaras, who open the performance, as well Yingniang's tribhanga pose and playing a pipa behind her head. Set designs were similarly drawn from the caves, including large replicas of the grottos in Scenes 2 and 4. Other movements, such as toe-walks and barrel turns, were adapted from traditional Chinese dance. Elements of ballet, such as fouetté turns, were also incorporated. Musical cues drew from Chinese and Persian stylings, at times blended and at times interspersed.

Developed after the end of the Cultural Revolution, Rain of Flowers Along the Silk Road was intended as an overture of friendship and expression of China's intent to re-establish diplomatic ties with other countries; it was also one of several works developed after the model opera requirement was removed. Thematically, it resembled such model works in its depiction of downtrodden commoners being freed of their suffering. It innovated, however, in its positive presentation of a wealthy merchant as well as the reciprocal heroics of its foreign and Chinese characters.

== Performance history ==
Rain of Flowers Along the Silk Road was debuted in Lanzhou on 23 May 1979. It was performed at the Great Hall of the People in Beijing on 1 October. Subsequent performances were staged for the Central Guard Bureau and the Beijing Military Region. Audiences included national leaders such as Deng Xiaoping and Ye Jianying, as well as Chinese celebrities and foreign dignitaries.

International performances of Rain of Flowers Along the Silk Road began in 1979, with stagings in Hong Kong drawing praise. The show was brought to North Korea two years later, where it was praised by Kim Jong-il as showcasing "the aspirations and wishes of the people who ... opposed the corrupt feudal ruling quarters in those days [of the Tang dynasty] and all social evils caused by them." Since then, performances have been recorded in more than twenty countries, including at La Scala in Milan, Italy, as well as in France, Japan, Russia, Taiwan, Thailand, and the United States. Exploring its usage as part of China's soft power, Harm Langenkamp describes the show as reassuring foreign audiences that "China's current leadership aspires to nothing other than 'a harmonious world of durable peace and common prosperity'".

== Legacy ==
With the success of Rain of Flowers Along the Silk Road, a new genre of dance emerged: the Dunhuang dance, which has gained recognition as one of Chinese foremost classical dance styles. The story has been updated several times. A new version of the show was produced in 2008, again for National Day festivities, and performed at the National Centre for the Performing Arts in Beijing; that year, a significantly modified version was incorporated into the 2008 Summer Olympics opening ceremony. The show was again updated in 2016; another version is designed specifically for performance for tourists. According to China Daily, as of 2019 the show had been staged almost three thousand times, with 300 million renminbi generated in revenue and 4.5 million tickets sold.

Rain of Flowers Along the Silk Road was among the best received during the 1979 National Day celebration, receiving first place in all categories. In 1994 it was deemed China's Classic Dance Drama of the Twentieth Century, gaining the nickname "the Swan Lake of the East". It was granted the First Outstanding Repertory Opera Award by the Ministry of Culture in 2009. In 2019, the director Zhou Bing produced a documentary on the drama to commemorate its fortieth anniversary. He conducted interviews with forty dramatists and dancers, tracing its production through its present performances.

== Works cited ==
- 纪录片《穿越丝路的花雨》：周兵与敦煌的第N次相遇 [Documentary Film: "Rain of Flowers Along the Silk Road": Zhou Bing's Nth Encounter with Dunhuang]. The Paper (in Chinese). 27 October 2019. Archived from the original on 21 December 2024.
- 丝路花雨 [Rain of Flowers Along the Silk Road] (in Chinese). National Digital Culture Network of China. 2003. Archived from the original on 24 December 2006.
- "Flower Rains Along the Silk Road: A Timeless Classic". China Daily. 21 November 2019. Archived from the original on 24 June 2020.
- Kuang, Lanlan (2016). "Staging the Silk Road Journey Abroad: The Case of Dunhuang Performative Arts". M/C Journal. 19 (5). doi:10.5204/mcj.1155.
- Langenkamp, Harm (2014). "Conflicting Dreams of Global Harmony in US-PRC Silk Road Diplomacy". In Ahrendt, Rebekah; Ferraguto, Mark; Mahiet, Damien (eds.). Music and Diplomacy from the Early Modern Era to the Present. pp. 83–102. doi:10.1057/9781137463272. ISBN 978-1-349-50019-2.
- Wilcox, Emily (2019). Revolutionary Bodies: Chinese Dance and the Socialist Legacy. Berkeley: University of California Press. ISBN 978-0-520-30057-6. JSTOR j.ctv941vcs.
