= Tang performance arts in Dunhuang =

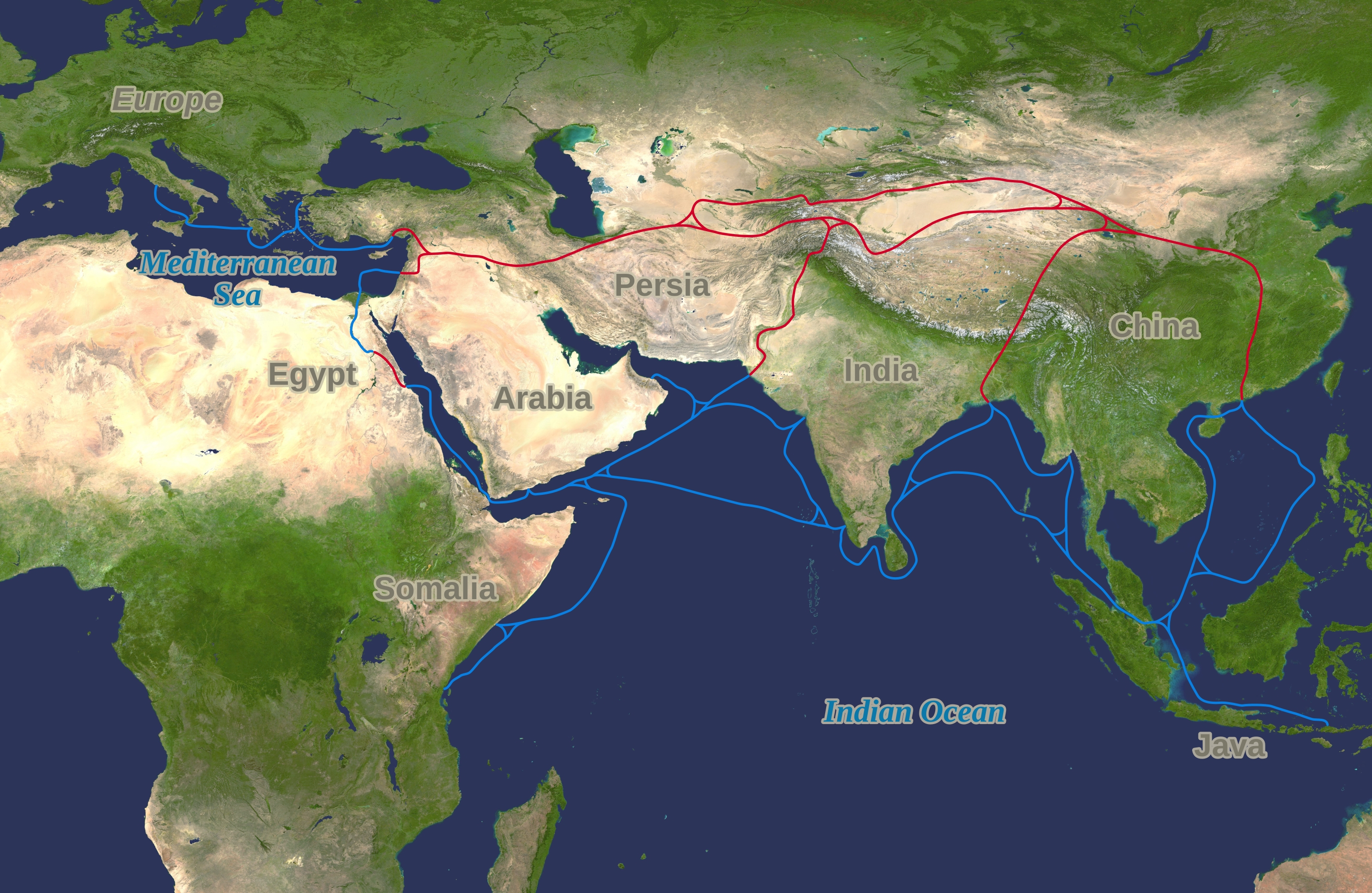
The Silk Road

The Tang dynasty (618-907) was one of the most prosperous dynasties in Chinese history. During this period, people from Central Asia frequently traded with people who lived in the Tang capital Chang'an through the Silk Road.

As a result, there are large amounts of preserved material cultures that are seen as evidence of interactions between these areas, such as wall paintings, sculptures, print and textiles. These remains can reflect to what extent the frequency of the interactions were. One of the most spectacular material cultures here is the Tang dynasty. The Tang dynasty can be regarded as a milestone of drastic cultural transformation in Dunhuang since it began in 619. Before the Tang Dynasty, the arts in Dunhuang can be divided into two main trends: northwest tribes and central plains (China). Both these art works existed separately and were presented for different groups of people. Due to territory expansion in the Tang dynasty, China was more powerful than before and became influential in other countries. In 642, the completion of cave 220 that commissioned by the Cui family can be regarded as the first influence of Tang art in Dunhuang. Until Dunhuang was conquered by Tibet in 781, the effect of the Tang dynasty in Dunhuang murals was significant and that was typically seen as a landmark for establishing the main trend in Chinese art styles in different aspects.

== Artistic trend in the Tang ==
During the Tang Dynasty, the material cultures were presented in distinct ways. From the holistic point of view, due to a brand new trend of arts, the poets, art historians and connoisseurs made an effort to portray observable phenomena of human behaviours, such as emotions, movements, motivations and traditional customs. They often took preparatory sketches in order to organise the positions of different figures and objects. They also used more colors to make the paintings colourful and magnificent. Through these tiny details, the artists showed their great skills at capturing complex emotions in facial expressions and body gestures. There is a story about a famous artist called Wu Daozi that can be seen as an example to explain the main drawing trend in the Tang dynasty. It is said that Wu Daozi had painted some dragons with vivid scales that seemed to be flying into the sky. On days when it was about to rain, the mist would rise surround the drawing. In other words, the popular painting style in the Tang dynasty was to conflate illusion and reality to make people approach the core spirit of truth. The material culture in Dunhuang, especially in the aspects of performance, has preserved these auras.

== Influence of Buddhism on Tang culture ==
Some arts in Dunhuang show the rituals that people used as part of Buddhism. In China, people often regarded icons of the Buddha as sacred objects with magical potency. Because of the unknown dangers on the Silk Road, people who needed to pass through would pray to the statues or portraits of the Buddha in order to receive the conferment of a blessing. Due to the high demand of trading along the Silk Road, the worship of Buddhism was thriving in Tang times.

Buddhism originated from India and took root gradually in China through many independent groups of travelling monks and their followers. The earliest evidence for the Buddhist community dates back to AD 65 in what is now Jiangsu and Shandong. In the Han dynasty (BC 202-AD 220), a Buddhist community was flourishing near Luoyang which was the capital of the Han dynasty. During this period, more and more sutras were translated into Chinese. Since AD 220, China was separated by two occupiers which caused a division between north and south. After the reunification of Sui(AD 598-618), Buddhism gradually established the fundamental disciplines. In the Tang dynasty, Buddhism became an important religion for loyal families and people in all walks of life to obey and worship.

Hence, some Buddhist rituals that were vital on various occasions were recorded by monks and their followers in Dunhuang. For example, the “Sketches of mudra” shows the traditional dancing gestures in mudra. The long roll of paper dates back to the late ninth century and the margins at top and bottom were originally intended to copy the context of the sutra. The “Sketches on mudra” can be divided into a few parts, such as a set of nine standing figures, two seated figures, thirty six pairs of hands and two single hands. According to the repertoire of mudra, researchers suggest that this document may be closely related to the Esoteric school of Buddhism that was introduced into China in the eighth century. The function of this particular scroll was supposed to be a visual aid for teaching and worshipping.

There are some precious materials that present different types of Buddhist music and dance in Dunhuang. In the early Tang period, the layout of paintings transited into two a two-register format. Take a silk drawing “Paradise of Sakyamuni, with illustrations of episodes from the Baoen sutra” for example. This painting was also discovered at cave 17 which can date back to early the ninth century AD. It depicts the paradise of Buddha Sakyamuni and the story of Prince Sujati. In the upper register, there is a preaching Buddha and an illustration of the sutra. Besides this, there is one dancer in the middle of twelve musicians with different instruments. The lower register contains two groups of donors. The women with simple headdresses stood on the left while the men on the right wore close-fitting caps that can be seen as typical dresses in the tenth century.

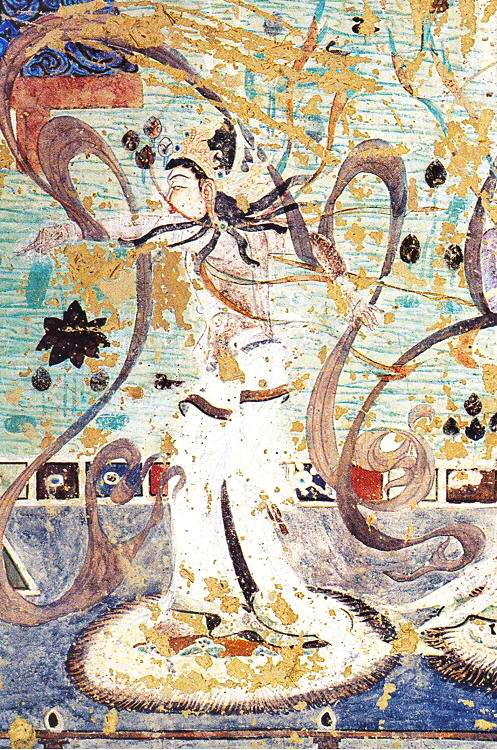
Cave 220 “Hu xuan” dancer in mural from Mogao.

== Tang influence as a reflection of the daily life along the Silk Road ==
The arts in Dunhuang also show actual lives along the Silk Road and the daily lives of noblemen in the Tang Dynasty. Music and dance were essential parts of Silk Road life which can be seen in various forms, such as the traveling troupes of musicians, the armies with drummers, or the popular songs in the towns, but they also made the patricians’ daily lives more interesting. The main features of the performance arts in Tang Dynasty can be divided into three aspects. Firstly, the dancing style called “Hu xuan” that derived from the western regions was popular. Artists in Dunhuang often used it as decoration in wall paintings. Secondly, playing instruments from the western regions was also popular, especially the “pipa”. People in the Tang dynasty not only played pipa but also danced with it. Lastly, people focused on the gestures from the upper part of the waist rather than the hands

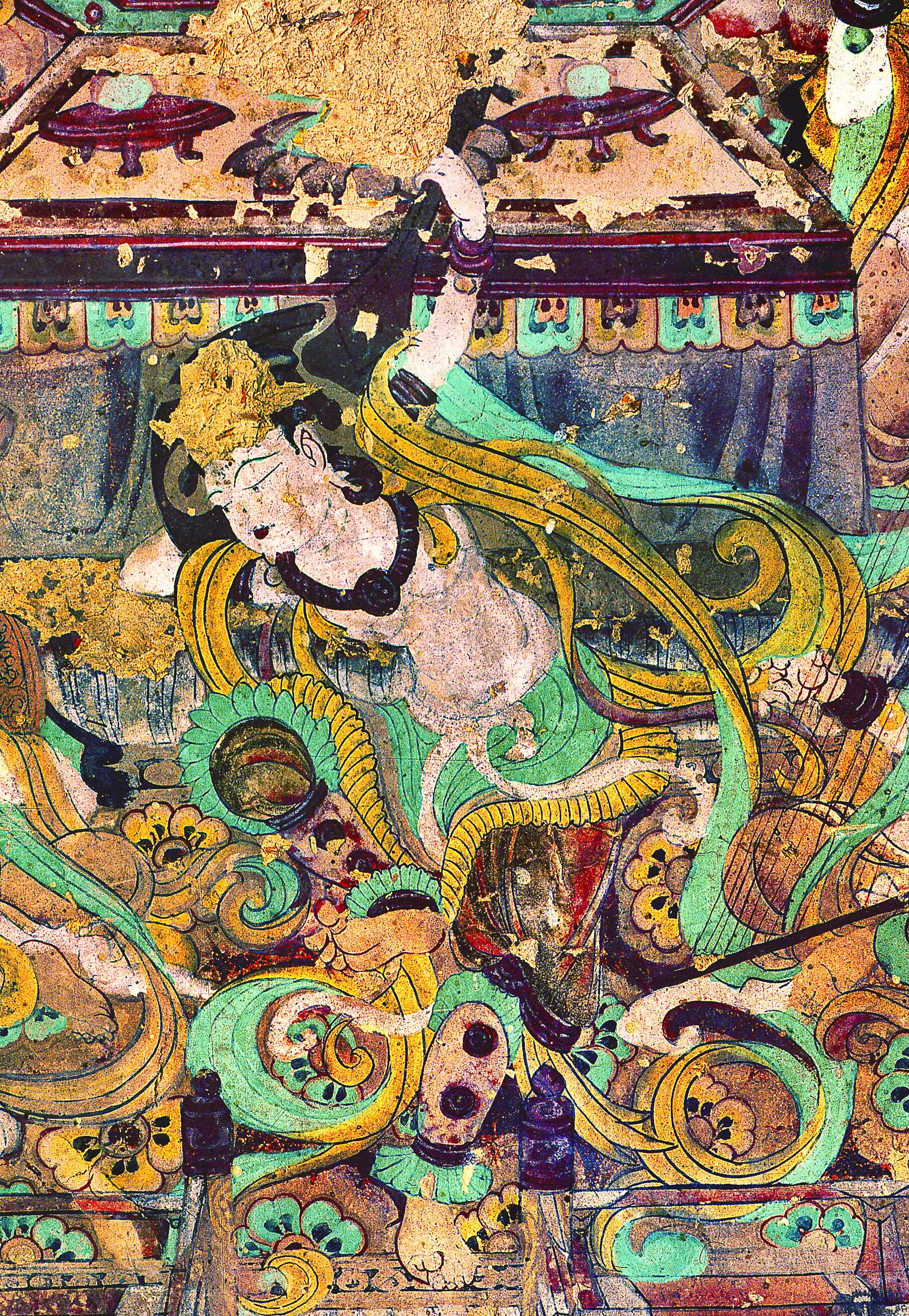
Playing the pipa behind the head.

=== Early Tang performance arts in Dunhuang ===
Hence, there are numerous material cultures that were closely related to the musicians and dancers in the wall paintings, portable paintings, musical instruments and pottery figures. In the early Tang dynasty, these kind of paintings were often on the below that could present more figures and movements in order to make the whole painting attractive. For example, the wall painting in cave 220 can be seen as a typical example of this trend. Twenty-six musicians and dancers were drawn below the main character. Moreover, two dancers in the painting danced on the circling carpet which often was regard as the most fashionable dancing style (Hu xuan) from the western regions.

=== Middle Tang performance arts in Dunhuang ===
In the middle Tang dynasty, the dancing and singing scenes became vital aspects that can be drawn in the main places. Take wall paintings for example, “Playing the pipa behind the head” was discovered in cave 112 of Mogao grottoes. Pipa in the Tang Dynasty was not only an instrument but also an accessory for dancing. The figure in this wall painting was leaning forward and raising her legs with the pipa playing behind her back. It is a difficult skill in Chinese dancing history that can be seen as a precious material for researchers. In cave 15 and cave 25 in the Yulin grottoes, there are two wall paintings that present enjoyable dancing and music scenes from the middle Tang dynasty. The former one called “Vadya devata” shows a vadya playing a traditional instrument with pretty clothing. Moreover, her clothes seem to be blowing in the wind through analysing the detail of her scarf. The later one is “Dancing and music scenes”. The main character is in the middle, dancing with her drum at the waist. The other figures play various instruments and can be divided into two teams that were separated into the right and left hand sides.

=== Late Tang performance arts in Dunhuang ===
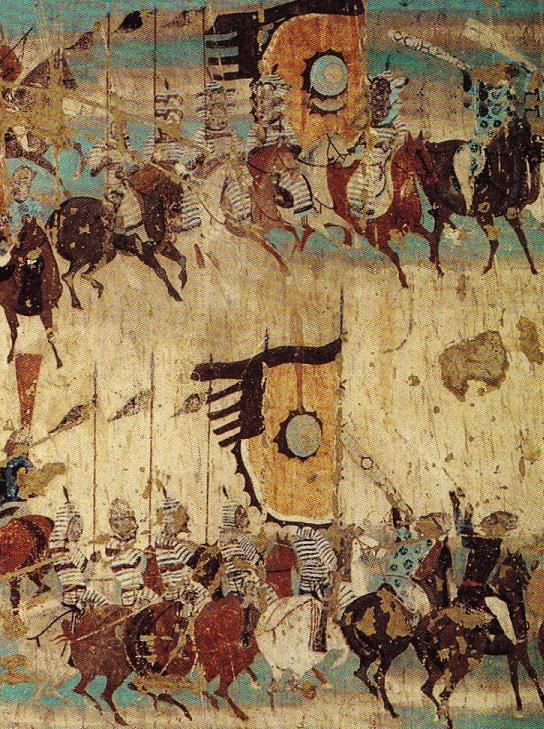
Cave 156, Late Tang Dynasty. The detail of Zhang Yichao army.

During the late Tang dynasty, dancing and singing had become essential part of daily lives. As a result, people combined the actual narratives and dancing and singing scenes in the aspects of art. One of the wall paintings in cave 156 of the Mogao grottoes called “Zhang Yichan commanding the army to set out” can be traced back to the late Tang dynasty. Zhang Yichan helped the Tang Empire to reclaim the lost territories and was regarded as a vital commander. However, the official history did not collect sufficient information about him. The wall painting in Dunhuang provides more detail about Zhang Yichan that can compensate for the shortage of official documents. In this painting, there is cavalry with flags that walked in the front. After the cavalry, there is a group of instrumentalists and dancers that can be separated into two lines. The celebration reflected imperial ceremony and aristocratic pursuits in the Tang Dynasty. In the same cave, there was a wall painting called “Lady Song, wife of the Dunhuang general Zhang Yichan” which was drawn on the eastern and northern parts. The main story in this wall painting shows a grand scene of the main character, Zhang Yichan’s wife, in the ceremonial procession for honoring her husband’s victory. In the front of the group, there are acrobatic teams with dancers and musicians. There were four women that seemed to lead the main character and all wear Han clothing with various patterns. It presents the desire for military power and social prestige in the late Tang dynasty.

== Others ==
There are some different artefacts can be regarded as evidences of various types of performing, such as ink on paper or pottery figures. “Tables of musical notation” was written in ink on the paper and also excavated in cave 17 in Dunhuang. The first aspect of “Tables of musical notation” contains a few words of popular songs in the Tang dynasty and some Buddhist texts as well. The following notations include ten songs, such as “Songs of the South” and “The Paired Phoenixes”. Until now, many researchers have focused on reproducing the music of the Tang dynasty from “Tables of musical notation”. Moreover, there were some pottery figures showing the fashionable clothing trends of the Tang period. “The female musicians” shows two women with Kuchean and Chinese fashions. The Kuchean musician plays a pipa originating from Iran which had reached China and become popular, while the Chinese musician plays a drum that derived from India. “The female dancers” depicts both Sogdian and Chinese dancers in clothing and appearance. Besides, the gestures of these pottery figures showed the latest trend of Sogdian whirlwind and twirling dances

== See also ==
- Dunhuang dance
- International Dunhuang Project
- Buddhism in China
- Tang dynasty art
- Silk Road transmission of Buddhism
