= Sanam (dance) =

Music genre and type of dance

A performance of "Pomegranate Blossoms," a sanam dance, at the Kennedy Center in Washington, D.C.

Sanam, or senem, also written as sainaimu (Chinese: 赛乃姆; pinyin: sàinǎimǔ) in Chinese, is an ethnic music and dance widespread among the Uyghur people in the Chinese autonomous region of Xinjiang. It is commonly performed during weddings, festive occasions, and parties. The music normally starts slowly and gradually becomes faster, at which point the dances also become more vivid, especially at the end.

== Sanam music ==
Sanam music is a suite that ranged from six to thirteen songs played usually for dancing. It however may also be played as purely instrumental version by naghra-sunay bands. The songs start with a moderate four-beat dance rhythm and move gradually towards a faster four-beat.

There are various types of sanam music, and the major oasis towns have their own distinctive vocal style and suite of songs. Often the name of the place is mentioned before the word sanam in local variations.

== Sanam dance ==
Dancers' movements include characteristic neck movements, and movements of elbows, eyes and fingers. The dancers may also improvise, following the tempo of the music. Each region may have its own distinctive dance.

Dancers and singers are separated.
