= Seoul Korea Temple =

Latter-day Saints Temple in South Korea

- Interactive map of Seoul Korea Temple
- Number: 37
- Dedication: 14 December 1985, by Gordon B. Hinckley
- Site: 1 acre (0.40 ha)
- Floor area: 28,057 ft^{2} (2,606.6 m^{2})
- Height: 112 ft (34 m)
- Official website • News & images

Church chronology
← Johannesburg South Africa Temple	Seoul Korea Temple	→ Lima Peru Temple

Additional information
- Announced: 1 April 1981, by Spencer W. Kimball
- Groundbreaking: 9 May 1983, by Marvin J. Ashton
- Open house: 26 November 26 – 7 December 1985
- Current president: Taegul Kim
- Designed by: Church A&E Services and Komerican Architects
- Location: Seoul, South Korea
- Coordinates: 37°33′32.24519″N 126°55′52.68360″E
- Exterior finish: Granite exterior
- Design: Modern adaptation of six-spire design
- Baptistries: 1
- Ordinance rooms: 4 (stationary)
- Sealing rooms: 3
- Visitors' center: yes

The Seoul Korea Temple (Korean: 한국 서울 성전) is the 37th operating temple of the Church of Jesus Christ of Latter-day Saints. Located in Seoul, South Korea, the temple was announced on April 1, 1981, by church president Spencer W. Kimball. It was the first temple constructed on the Asian mainland and the fourth built in Asia overall. Ground was broken on May 9, 1983, under the direction of Marvin J. Ashton of the Quorum of the Twelve Apostles, and the temple was dedicated on December 14–15, 1985, by Gordon B. Hinckley in six sessions. During the public open house held in late 1985, more than 12,000 people toured the building.

== History ==
Seoul Korea Temple in 2018

The temple was announced by church president Spencer W. Kimball on April 1, 1981, during a press conference held on Temple Square. At the time, South Korea had about 20,000 members, though only around 100 had received their endowment and just 20 couples had been sealed. On May 9, 1983, Marvin J. Ashton of the Quorum of the Twelve Apostles presided at the groundbreaking ceremony.

Earlier milestones in Korea's church history set the stage for a temple: Joseph Fielding Smith, of the Quorum of the Twelve, dedicated the land of Korea for preaching on August 2, 1955; full-time missionaries arrived in 1956; and the country’s first stake was organized on March 8, 1973. In 1970, mission leaders secured permission for church members from Korea to travel to the Laie Hawaii Temple for ordinances. Spencer J. Palmer, as mission president beginning in 1965, directed the purchase of the Shinch’on property where the temple was later built.

Initial plans called for a smaller temple, but due to the sacrifices of Korean members, the design was revised and enlarged three times, requiring the demolition of an existing mission office and meetinghouse.

Following completion of construction, a public open house was held November 26 to December 7, 1985, with about 12,500 people touring the temple. The dedication followed over six sessions by Gordon B. Hinckley, first counselor in the First Presidency, on December 14–15, 1985.

After the temple was dedicated, a subway system was built in conjunction with the 1988 Summer Olympics in Seoul. The system included a line that ended right at the base of the hill upon which the temple was built, making the temple even more accessible for church members.

== Design and architecture ==
The temple is located near what is today Sinchon Station on the Seoul Subway Line 2. This station is located near four major South Korean universities: Yonsei University, Hongik University, Ewha Womans University, and Sogang University.

The temple has a modern six-spire design, developed by church architectural staff with the local firm Komerican Architects. Calvin Wardell was the construction adviser, and Woo Chang was the contractor. The temple is on a one-acre hillside plot in central Seoul. Landscaping includes shrubs, bushes, and a fountain at the entrance.

The building measures 178 feet by 71 feet, with the exterior using native Korean granite, with six spires. The tallest spire rises to 112 feet and has an angel Moroni statue on its top, symbolizing the restoration of the gospel of Jesus Christ. The temple’s floor area totals 28,057 square feet. It includes a baptistry, four ordinance rooms, and three sealing rooms.

== Temple leadership and admittance ==
The church's temples are directed by a temple president and matron, each typically serving for a term of three years. The president and matron oversee the administration of temple operations and provide guidance and training for both temple patrons and staff. Serving from 1985 to 1988, Robert H. Slover was the first president, with Rosemarie W. Slover serving as matron. As of September 2025, Taegul Jung is the president and Mikyung Kim is the matron. Notable temple presidents include Spencer J. Palmer (1988-1990).

Like all the church's temples, it is not used for Sunday worship services. To members of the church, temples are regarded as sacred houses of the Lord. Once dedicated, only church members with a current temple recommend can enter for worship.

== See also ==
- Comparison of temples of The Church of Jesus Christ of Latter-day Saints
- List of temples of The Church of Jesus Christ of Latter-day Saints
- List of temples of The Church of Jesus Christ of Latter-day Saints by geographic region
- Temple architecture (Latter-day Saints)
- The Church of Jesus Christ of Latter-day Saints in South Korea
