= Guangzhou Ballet =

Chinese ballet company

Guangzhou Ballet Troupe

General information
- Name: Guangzhou Ballet Troupe
- Year founded: 1994
- Founders: Zhang Dandan
- Website: http://www.gzballet.org

Senior staff
- Director: Zhang Dandan

Other
- Official school: Guangzhou Ballet School
- Formation: Principal; First Soloist; Soloist; Corps de Ballet

The Guangzhou Ballet Troupe is a classical ballet company based in Guangzhou, China. In addition to works from the classical European ballet repertoire, the company performs works of classical and contemporary Chinese ballet. The company is one of the top four ballet companies in China. It was founded in 1994, and is currently headed by dancer Zhang Dandan. The company tours internationally.

== History ==
Guangzhou Ballet was founded in 1994 by Zhang Dandan, a former dancer with the National Ballet of China. The current company has many members who are graduates from the Beijing Dance Academy. Notable dancers in the company include Zou Guang, Tong Shusheng, Zhang Dandan Guo Fei and Qiu Lu.

Members of the company are trained in the Vaganova method, following the tradition of Russian ballet introduced to China following the Communist Revolution. The Vaganova method has its origins at the Imperial Russian ballet in St. Petersburg.

Guangzhou Ballet is also involved in cultural exchanges with foreign ballet choreographers, dancers, and instructors. Foreign artists and ballet coaches from France, Canada, USA, Russia, Britain, Germany and Sweden have participated in projects with the Guangzhou Ballet Troupe.

== Guangzhou Ballet School ==
Guangzhou Ballet School is a boarding school providing classes to students age 10 to 18. The school facilities include 16 studios, academic classrooms, a cafeteria, and a pointe shoe factory.

== Repertoire ==
Guangzhou Ballet has staged many ballet classics including productions of Coppélia, Don Quixote, Le Corsaire, Swan Lake, La Sylphide, the Butterfly Lovers, ballet dramas Anna Karenina, La Traviata and Romeo and Juliet, and selected scenes from Amelia Goes to the Ball, in addition to works by Ramuntcho, Rachmaninov and Bartók. Contemporary foreign works performed by the Guangzhou Ballet include Theme and Variations and Serenade by George Balanchine.

Guangzhou Ballet has also staged the Chinese-style ballets That Day, This Moment, Lan Huahua, Goddess of the Luo River, and in 1997 The Celestial Phoenix, which won several awards from the Fifth China Drama Festival. Dancing over the Xiaoxiang River was staged in 1993 as a newly choreographed work. The Yellow River and The Dream of the Red Chamber are other Chinese ballet works performed by the company.

== See also ==
- Dance in China
