= Ballet Folklorico Paso Del Norte =

Ballet Folklorico Paso Del Norte is a non-profit dance company in El Paso, Texas under the direction of Rodolfo Hernandez. The company was started in 1978 as part of El Paso Community College. The company has since become an independent group and traveled throughout the southwest United States including New Mexico, Arizona, Utah and California.
