= China National Ethnic Song and Dance Ensemble =

Performance group in China

China National Ethnic Song and Dance Ensemble (Chinese: 中央民族歌舞团, variously translated as China Central Song and Dance Ensemble of Ethnic Groups or Central Nationalities Song and Dance Ensemble), based in Beijing, is a national-level performance group representing China's ethnic minorities managed by the National Ethnic Affairs Commission of the United Front Work Department. It was founded in September 1952 by Premier Zhou Enlai. Today, with over 300 members representing 36 ethnic groups, it has performed in over 70 countries and gives over 100 performances each year. Its president is the ethnomusicologist, performer and First Lady of China, Peng Liyuan.

== Departments ==
China National Ethnic Song and Dance Ensemble contains fifteen departments to take charge of different affairs.

== The China National Ethnic Song and Dance Ensemble Theater ==
=== Location ===
South Street No. 21, Haidian District Zhongguancun, Beijing City. Next to the Minzu University of China, the Art Academy of PLA, Peking University Stomatological Hospital and Beijing Foreign Studies University.

=== Information ===
The construction of the central national song and dance troupe National Theater building was completed in December 2012. It covers an area of 20 square kilometers, 2 levels of more than 900 seats for the audience. The theater also contains a 500-square-meter theater within it, a meeting room, 2 vip rooms, 7 rehearsal rooms and 8 dressing rooms in total. The China National Ethnic Song and Dance Ensemble Theater is equipped with professional audio and lighting systems and is capable of hosting performances with various purposes, including performance, public relations activities, news conference, TV programs, conferences and training activities.

== See also ==
- Music of China
- List of folk dance performance groups
