= Wuju =

Chinese narrative concert dance

Wuju (simplified Chinese: 舞剧; traditional Chinese: 舞劇; pinyin: Wǔjù; lit. 'dance drama') is a type of narrative concert dance from China. Developed in the 1950s with influences from ballet and traditional Chinese dance, performances seek to tell stories through intricate movement rather than song. Tales may be derived from various sources, including novels and folklore. Two works, The White-Haired Girl and The Red Detachment of Women, were among the few "revolutionary performances" allowed during the Cultural Revolution; both drew predominantly from ballet.

== Definition ==
Generally, wuju refers to a form of dance drama practised in China since the 1950s. Such performances require scripts and choreography, musical accompaniment, as well as costumes, lighting, setpieces, and other elements of stage drama; larger performances may be accompanied by a full orchestra, with Western and traditional Chinese instruments. Performances may last for a whole evening, and are structured to allow for a climax and denouement. The term may also be used in Chinese as a synonym for ballet.

== History ==
Wuju emerged in the 1950s as China sought to develop a national dance drama. This was a challenging project, as traditional Chinese theatre provided little precedence for non-verbal dance-based narration. Influences came from the Soviet Union, with which the newly established People's Republic of China was enjoying a strong relationship. Several Soviet troupes toured China in the mid-1950s, putting on such productions as La Esmerelda to favourable reviews; at the same time, critics rejected a pure ballet as poorly suited to the country's needs. Also contributing to the concept of dance theatre was Chinese opera, which the dramatist Gao Di'an argued could provide a fruitful foundation for a specifically Chinese form of dance drama; in the dance journal Wudao, Lu Jing likewise called for a dance that linked local traditions with an internationally recognized modern Chinese dance.

In 1955, the Beijing Dance Academy began to offer special courses in dance drama choreography. Taught by Soviet instructors, first Viktor Ivanovich Tsaplin and later Pyotr Gusev, these courses aimed to produce choreographers as well as stories. Early performances were staged by the Central Experimental Opera Theater (now the China National Opera); these included Stealing Immortal Herbs (adapted from the legend of the White Snake), co-directed by Huang Boshou and Li Zhonglin, in 1955. A full-length story titled Magic Lotus Lantern (宝莲灯; 寶蓮燈) was staged by the troupe in 1957 and co-supervised by Tsaplin and Li Shaochun.

Dance dramas became more prevalent in China during the Great Leap Forward, with more than twenty produced between 1958 and 1960. Put on by such organizations as the Guangzhou Military Soldier Song and Dance Ensemble and the Shanghai Experimental Opera Theatre, these works were produced in response to a government call for new and innovative collaborative cultural products. Several productions, including Five Red Clouds (五朵红云; 五朵紅雲, 1960) and Dagger Society (小刀会; 小刀會, 1961) are documented by contemporary films. The latter drama was subsequently performed in North Korea and parts of the Eastern Bloc.

During the Cultural Revolution, dance theatre became one of the "model works" permitted by the Chinese Communist Party. Two of these works, which were known as "revolutionary modern ballets", were specifically permitted by Jiang Qing: The White-Haired Girl and The Red Detachment of Women. Both revolutionary ballets have continued to be performed into the 21st century. Other existing stories, which relied more on traditional forms than ballet, were not performed until after the revolution.

The creation of new wuju continued after the Cultural Revolution ended. Many adopted traditional themes. Such works included Rain of Flowers Along the Silk Road (1979), a story set in the Tang dynasty that used movements derived from paintings found in the Mogao Caves, as well as several based on Cao Xueqin's novel Dream of the Red Chamber (1828). Ballet elements were less commonly included, though they have been noted in works such as Zhang Yimou's Raise the Red Lantern (based on the 1991 film). As of 2019, more than a thousand individual works of wuju have been staged.

== Style ==
The earliest productions, Stealing Immortal Herbs and Magic Lotus Lantern, drew extensively from the Chinese opera in their costumes and staging techniques, including combat sequences. Later works diverged in their influences, with some incorporating military dance elements and others drawing on the traditional movements of the Han and other ethnic groups; Five Red Clouds, for instance, drew from the practices and stories of the Hlai people. This tendency shifted during the Cultural Revolution, at which time wuju became dominated by ballet.

Early works of wuju used distinct movements for characters with diverse backgrounds. In Magic Lotus Lantern, for instance, the Third Sacred Mother – a divine being – uses a vocabulary that draws from Buddhist art and traditional opera. Meanwhile, in Dagger Society, the Shanghai peasant used a blend of Han folk dance and Shanghainese martial arts.

Wuju has taken various themes. Several works – including Fires of Fury in the Coconut Grove (1965) and Remain in Combat Readiness (1965) – have called for Pan-Asian solidarity. Others, such as the People's Liberation Army's Fires of Fury Are Burning (1965), decried racial violence outside China or commemorated anti-imperialist struggles around the globe. The 2003 drama Yunnan Impressions (云南映象; 雲南映像), meanwhile, deals with ecological themes.

== Works cited ==
- 70年，我们的中国舞剧 [70 Years of Dance Drama]. The Paper (in Chinese). 19 November 2019. Archived from the original on 19 December 2024.
- Feng Shuangbai (冯双白) (13 December 2024). 舞剧 [Dance Drama] (in Chinese). Archived from the original on 19 December 2024.
- MacKerras, Colin (2005). "Wuju". In Davis, Edward (ed.). Encyclopedia of Contemporary Chinese Culture. London and New York: Routledge. pp. 926–927. ISBN 978-0-415-24129-8.
- Wilcox, Emily (2018). "The Postcolonial Blind Spot". Positions: Asia Critique. 26 (4): 781–815. doi:10.1215/10679847-7050569.
- Wilcox, Emily (2019). Revolutionary Bodies: Chinese Dance and the Socialist Legacy. Berkeley: University of California Press. ISBN 978-0-520-30057-6. JSTOR j.ctv941vcs.
