= Tamburitzans =

The Tamburitzans
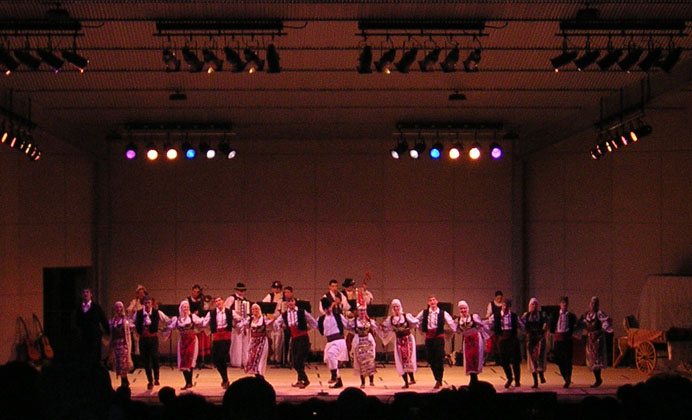
- Duquesne University Tamburitzans performing at South Park in Pittsburgh, Pennsylvania, on August 25, 2006.

Background information
- Origin: Pittsburgh, Pennsylvania, United States
- Genres: Folk, Traditional, Eastern European.
- Years active: 1937–present
- Website: www.thetamburitzans.org

The Tamburitzans (formerly the Duquesne University Tamburitzans) are the longest-running multicultural song and dance company in the United States. Headquartered in Pittsburgh, Pennsylvania, the company's members are full-time students who receive scholarships for their activities. The Tamburitzans are dedicated to perpetuating international cultural heritage through entertaining performance - while awarding scholarships to talented and deserving students attending a Pittsburgh-based school.

The Tamburitzans were formed on February 3, 1937, by Dr. A. Lester Pierce, who brought his "Slavonic Tamburitza Orchestra" from St. Edward's University of Austin, Texas to Pittsburgh, Pennsylvania, where the group was well received by the region's diverse ethnic communities. Dr. Pierce negotiated an arrangement with Duquesne University, involving a work scholarship program, and the tradition of The Tamburitzans began. Over the years, The Tamburitzans have recorded albums and have toured extensively (sometimes internationally) performing music and dance mainly from Eastern Europe and its neighboring folk cultures. The Tamburitzans are affectionately known as "the Tammies" in some circles.

The Tamburitzans headquarters at 1801 Boulevard of the Allies was originally built as the Warner Bros. film exchange building in the 1920s and served the studio until the 1960s.

In September 2014, Duquesne University announced that the Tamburitzans would become an independent nonprofit over the subsequent two to three years. As of July 1, 2016, The Tamburitzans ensemble officially is supported by PIFAI - Pittsburgh International Folk Arts Institute - a 501(c)(3) non-profit corporation headquartered in Pittsburgh.

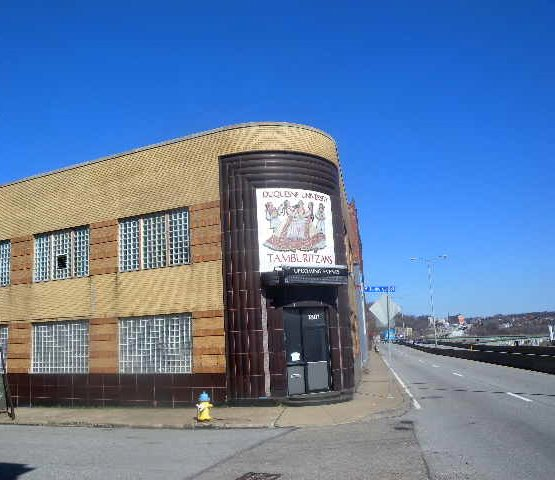
1801 Boulevard of the Allies

== See also ==
- List of folk dance performance groups
- List of music organizations in the United States
