= Pirin Folk Ensemble =

Bulgarian performance group

The Pirin Folk Ensemble (Bulgarian: Фолклорен ансамбъл „Пирин“, Folkloren ansambal „Pirin“) (also Pirin Folk Song and Dances State Ensemble) is a Bulgarian performance group. It consists of a folk orchestra, a dance troupe, and a women's choir. The ensemble strives to preserve Bulgarian culture by performing traditional music and dance from throughout Bulgaria. It has performed over 6500 concerts in 50 countries, and produced numerous LPs, CDs, videos, and songbooks. National Geographic called Pirin "an organic synthesis of the regional folk choral and dance traditions of Bulgaria."

The Pirin Folk Ensemble, named after the Pirin Mountains, was founded in 1954 in Blagoevgrad, a town in southwestern Bulgaria. Professor Kiril Stefanov was the Pirin Folk Ensemble's chief art director and conductor for many years.

== Productions ==
=== CDs ===
- Magical Voices of Bulgaria, 1994
- The Voice of Pirin, 1995
- Ray Lema Professeur Stefanov et les Voix Bulgares de l'Ensemble Pirin, 1997
- Pirin Folk, 1998
- Bulgarian Voices, 1999
- Folk Bouquet: Pirin Pearls, 2000
- Zapei, Zemya, 2002
- Variegated Folk Kaleidescope, 2003

=== Videos ===
- "My Pirin": Folk Bouquet of melodies, songs and rhythms
- All That Youth, 1996

== See also ==
- Bulgarian dances
- Music of Bulgaria
- Pirin Mountains
- List of folk dance performance groups
