= BYU International Folk Dance Ensemble =

The Brigham Young University International Folk Dance Ensemble is a Brigham Young University (BYU) performing group that performs folk dances from many parts of the world. They were established as a small performing group in 1959 by Mary Bee Jensen and have grown to include around 180 participants. However, about 30 of the dancers participate in the touring ensemble which has performed in many locations around the world including at the cultural festival held in connection with the 1988 Olympics in Seoul, Korea and at the opening ceremonies in the 2002 Winter Olympics in Salt Lake City.

== History ==
The BYU International Folk Dance Ensemble was established in 1956 by Mary Bee Jensen when she was asked to organize Scandinavian dances for a congregation meeting of the Church of Jesus Christ of Latter-day Saints. Janie Thompson, the director of BYU's Young Ambassadors performing group, aided Jensen early on in the development of the program. The ensemble was part of the university's Program Bureau which organized tours and performances of BYU performing groups. The ensemble began with a few couples with Jensen as director.

In 1959, the ensemble established the annual "Christmas Around the World" concert which showcases authentic dances from around the world. Jensen led the folk dancers on their first international tour in 1964 using her own funds, becoming the first student performing group at BYU to tour internationally. The United States People-to-People Organization sent the BYU folk dancers to the International Folk Dance Festival in Varde, Denmark in 1964. In 1969, former performer Don Allen became the assistant director.

From 1956 to 1972, they averaged over 100 shows per year. From 1967 to 1973, the ensemble performed two-hour concerts with the ballroom dancers across the United States. During years 1971 and 1972, the folk dancers participated in several performances at prominent locations including a concert in Houston for the American Association of Health, Physical Education, and Recreation convention; a concert in Denver for the International Convention of the Federated Women's Clubs; and a performance at the Lincoln Center for the Performing Arts in New York City.

Additionally, in 1972, two teams of folk dancers participated in tours. The first team produced a television show called "America through Dance" for German national television in Munich, reaching over 20 million German-speaking viewers. The second team of dancers performed for Princess Grace Kelly of Monaco and performed in various folk dance festivals in Europe. The BYU folk dancers sponsored a folk dance festival in 1975 with dancers from Japan, Israel, Hawaii, and the Duquesne University Tamburitzans.

Edwin G. Austin became the second director of the dance group, replacing Jensen in 1985. Austin served as the artistic director of the folk dancers from 1985 to 2011. The International Folk Dance Ensemble performed in the opening ceremonies in the 1988 Summer Olympics in Seoul, Korea, as the only North American representative, and in the opening ceremonies of the 2002 Winter Olympics in Salt Lake City. In May 2019, the folk dance ensemble joined other BYU performing groups on BYU Young Ambassadors's 40th anniversary tour of China.

The ensemble consists of 180 dancers, 30 of which are on the touring team. The touring team is made up of 46 student dancers, musicians, and technicians. Participants are required to take several technical dancing classes in different international dancing styles. They perform a variety of cultural dancing native to international cultures including Irish stepdance, clogging, hula, and hopak.

== Tour history ==
Tour history begins in 1966 and continues to present day.

- 1966–1967 Spain, France, Netherlands, Wales, England, Belgium, Denmark, Sweden, West Germany, Austria, Greece
- 1967–1968 Portugal, Spain, England, Belgium, Netherlands, Finland, Ireland, Norway, Sweden, Denmark, Scotland
- 1968–1969 France, Netherlands, England, Scotland, Sweden, Denmark, Germany, Switzerland, Italy, Yugoslavia
- 1970–1971 Spain, Portugal, France, Switzerland, Denmark, Finland, Sweden, France, Italy, Belgium, England
- 1972–1973 Texas, New Mexico, Northwestern United States, Finland, Norway, Belgium, Spain, Yugoslavia, Greece, Israel, France, Denmark, France, Monaco, Italy, Yugoslavia, Netherlands, Germany, Northern California, Spain, Greece, Israel, France
- 1974–1975 Northwestern United States, Central California, Spain, Greece, Israel, France, Minnesota, New Jersey, Netherlands, Belgium, France, Spain
- 1976–1977 Southern California, France, Netherlands, Belgium, Israel, Romania, England, Midwestern United States, France, Spain, Italy, Poland, Switzerland, Northern California
- 1978–1979 Midwestern United States, Italy, France, Switzerland, England, Belgium, Israel, Romania, Bulgaria, USSR, Poland, Czechoslovakia, Hungary, Southern California
- 1980–1981 Northwestern United States, Southern California, Japan, Belgium, France, Netherlands, Switzerland, United Kingdom, Israel, Puerto Rico, Arizona, Japan, South Korea, Philippines, Hawaii, Republic of China, People's Republic of China, Taiwan, Hong Kong
- 1982–1983 Southern California, Quebec, Ontario, Canada, France, Italy, Switzerland, Hawaii, Japan, South Korea, People's Republic of China, Hong Kong, Philippines, Puerto Rico
- 1984–1985 Northern California, Nevada, Austria, Belgium, Switzerland, France, Netherlands, Idaho, Washington, Oregon, British Columbia, Finland, Sweden, Denmark, Norway
- 1986–1987 Switzerland, Israel, Southern California, Southeastern United States, New Mexico, Luxembourg, France, Germany
- 1988–1898 Northern California, Korea, Philippines, Republic of China, People's Republic of China, Hong Kong, Arizona, Japan, Hawaii, Soviet Union, Poland, England
- 1990–1991 Idaho, Washington, Northeastern United States, Eastern Canada, Southern California, Southern France, Spain, Portugal
- 1992–1993 Nevada, Northern California, Switzerland, France, North Carolina, Arizona, Chile, Argentina, Uruguay, Paraguay, Armenia, Berlin
- 1994–1995 Colorado, Turkey, Greece, Bulgaria, Jordan, Idaho, Oregon, Canada, New York, Pennsylvania, Ohio, Indianapolis, Minnesota, Illinois, Wisconsin
- 1996–1997 Utah, Nevada, Southern California, Denmark, Norway, Sweden, Finland, Russia, California, Nevada, Ukraine, Poland, Czech Republic, Slovak Republic, Germany, Austria, Switzerland, France
- 1998–1999 New Mexico, Texas, Indonesia, Thailand, Vietnam, China, Hong Kong, Canada, North Carolina, Virginia, Washington D.C., Arizona
- 2000–2001 Wyoming, Colorado, New Mexico, New Zealand, Australia, Idaho, Washington, Canada, New York, Belgium, England, Ireland, Scotland, Wales
- 2002–2003 Midwestern and Eastern United States, Nevada, California
- 2004–2005 Nevada, California, Belgium, France, Switzerland, Arizona, Tennessee, Arkansas, Mississippi, Louisiana, Georgia, Florida, South Carolina, Alabama
- 2006–2007 New Mexico, Texas, Lithuania, Latvia, Estonia, Canada, Utah, California, Nevada, Italy, France
- 2008–2009 Idaho, Washington, Oregon, Hungary, Slovakia, Czech Republic, Poland, Belarus, Ukraine, Montana, Wyoming, China, Hong Kong
- 2010–2011 Colorado, Illinois, Northern California, Nevada, Hungary, Czech Republic, Croatia
- 2012–2013 New Mexico, Texas, Louisiana, Arkansas, Southern California, Nevada, Illinois
- 2014–2015 Arizona, Switzerland, France, Belgium, Croatia, Spain
- 2016–2017 Illinois, Wisconsin, Northern California, Thailand, Vietnam, Cambodia
- 2018–2019 France, Belgium, Poland, Wyoming, Colorado, China
