= Kim Ho Jik =

South Korean academic (1905–1959)

- Hangul: 김호직
- Hanja: 金浩稙
- RR: Gim Hojik
- MR: Kim Hojik

Kim Ho Jik (Korean: 김호직; 16 April 1905 – 31 August 1959) was the first Korean convert to the Church of Jesus Christ of Latter-day Saints (LDS Church) and was a key figure in opening South Korea to the church's missionary work. Kim was also vice-minister of education in the administration of South Korean president Syngman Rhee.

Kim was born at Pyoktong in what is today North Korea. For a time while a youth, Kim studied at a Buddhist monastery. As a teenager Kim moved to Suwon. He graduated from Suwon Advanced Agricultural and Forestry School (수원고등농림학교) in 1924. In 1925, Kim became a member of a Protestant church and began studies at Tohoku University in Japan from which he graduated in 1930. Kim then served as president of Sookmyung Women's University for a time. In 1946, Kim took charge of the Suwon Agricultural Experimentation Station.

Kim began work on a doctoral degree at Cornell University in 1949. During this time, Kim was isolated from his family, as they stayed behind in Korea, and were affected by the Korean War. Kim was introduced to the LDS Church by Oliver Wayman, a fellow Cornell graduate student. Kim was baptized on September 29, 1951, in the Susquehanna River, the same body of water in which Joseph Smith and Oliver Cowdery were baptized in 1829.

Kim returned to Korea in 1952. He was appointed vice minister of education by South Korean president Syngman Rhee. Other positions Kim held after his return to Korea were a professorship at Hongik College, dean of animal husbandry at Konguk University, and the vice chairmanship of the Seoul City Board of Education. He also served as president of the National Fisheries College at Pusan. He was also a member of the Korean National Academy of Arts and Sciences.

Kim's children, Kim Tai Whan and Kim Young Sook, were among the first four people baptized into the LDS Church in Korea on August 3, 1952. Kim baptized his other two children, Kim Chun Sook and Kim Shin Hwan on January 3, 1953.

On August 2, 1955, Kim was set apart as the president of the Korean District of the LDS Church by apostle Joseph Fielding Smith. Among those influenced by Kim's church leadership was Han In Sang, who became a church general authority. Kim held the position of district president when he died.

In about 1970, Kim's widow, Pil Kun Park, joined the LDS Church.
