= Dabusiyya =

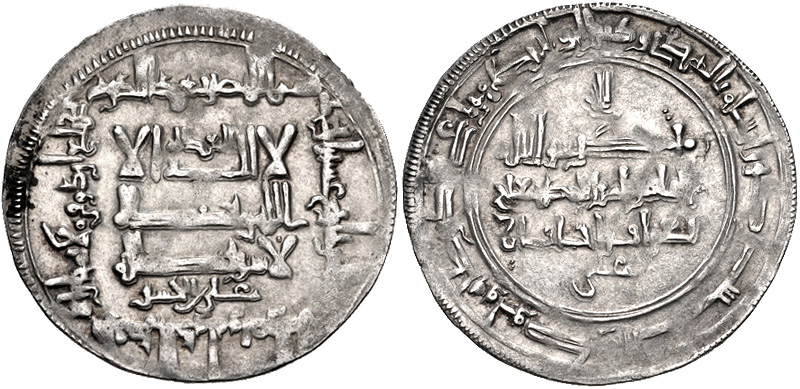
Dirham of Kara-Khanid ruler Ali-Tegin, minted at Dabusiyya in 1032/3.

Dabusiyya was a medieval town in the region of Sogdia in Transoxiana. It is notable for being the location where the Samanid pretender Isma'il Muntasir defeated the Karakhanids, before his eventual defeat and death. It was also the site of the Battle of Dabusiyya between the Ghaznavids and the Karakhanids, which ended in a draw.

== Sources ==
- Bosworth, C. E (2012). "Dabūsiyya". The Encyclopaedia of Islam, Second Edition (12 vols.). Leiden: E. J. Brill.
