= Böritigin =

Karakhanid ruler of Transoxiana from 1038 to 1068

- Ruler of Transoxiana
- Reign: 1038 – 1068
- Successor: Shams al-Mulk Nasr
- Died: 1068; Transoxiana
- Issue: Shams al-Mulk Nasr; Khizr Khan; Terken Khatun; Muhammad; Dawud
- Dynasty: Karakhanid dynasty
- Father: Nasr Illig Khan
- Religion: Sunni Islam

Böritigin, also known as Ibrahim ibn Nasr or Tamghach Khan Ibrahim, was a Karakhanid ruler in Transoxiana from 1038 to 1068. He was one of the most prominent rulers of the dynasty.

== Biography ==
Map of Khurasan, Transoxiana and Tokharistan

He was the son of Nasr Illig Khan, a Karakhanid ruler from the western branch of the family, known as the "Alids", which was named after their ancestor Ali Arslan Khan.

Böritigin is first mentioned some time after 1034, when he was imprisoned by the sons of the deceased Ali-Tegin, who was from the eastern branch of the family, known as the "Hasanids". However, Böritigin eventually managed in 1038 to escape to his brother who was at Uzgend, and then raised an army consisting of Kumiji tribes from the upper Oxus river. He proceeded to invade the territories of the Ghaznavid Sultan Mas'ud I and plundered Khuttal and Vakhsh. He then conquered Chaghaniyan and defeated a Ghaznavid counter-attack.

The following year Böritgin began fighting the sons of Ali-Tegin and by 1040 had annexed much of Transoxiana. He then made Samarkand his capital and took the title of "Tamghach Khan Ibrahim". In 1042, the newly crowned Ghaznavid ruler Maw'dud invaded the territories of the Seljuqs and conquered much of Khorasan. This greatly increased the fame of Maw'dud and made Böritigin acknowledge him as his suzerain. In ca. 1050, Maw'dud, with the aid of Böritigin and an army sent by the former Kakuyid ruler Garshasp I, re-invaded Khorasan; Böritigin and his commander Qashgha invaded Khwarazm and Tirmidh, but Maw'dud died and thus the invasion failed. The Seljuqs then extended their rule as far as Vakhsh and appointed a certain Abu 'Ali ibn Shadhan as the governor of their new conquests. After this Böritigin seems to have stopped recognizing the Ghaznavids as his suzerain.

In 1059/60 Böritigin forced the Karakhanid rulers of Farghana to acknowledge him as their suzerain. In the early 1060s, the newly crowned Seljuq ruler Alp Arslan invaded Transoxiana, which made Böritigin complain to the Abbasid caliph of needless aggression from the Seljuqs.

Böritigin died in 1068 and was succeeded by his son Shams al-Mulk Nasr. He also had a daughter named Terken Khatun who later married the son of Alp Arslan, Malik-Shah I.

== Sources ==
- Bosworth, C. E. (1975). "The early Ghaznavids". In Frye, R. N. (ed.). The Cambridge History of Iran, Volume 4: From the Arab Invasion to the Saljuqs. Cambridge: Cambridge University Press. pp. 162–198. ISBN 0-521-20093-8.
- Davidovich, E. A. (1996). "The Karakhanids". History of Civilizations of Central Asia, Volume III: The Crossroads of Civilizations: A.D. 250 to 750. Paris: UNESCO. pp. 119–145. ISBN 92-3-103211-9.
- Bosworth, C. E. (1968). "The Political and Dynastic History of the Iranian World (A.D. 1000–1217)". In Frye, R. N. (ed.). The Cambridge History of Iran, Volume 5: The Saljuq and Mongol periods. Cambridge: Cambridge University Press. pp. 1–202. ISBN 0-521-06936-X.
- Kochnev B.D. Numizmaticheskaya istoriya Karakhanidskogo kaganata (991—1209 gg.). Moskva «Sofiya», 2006
