= Hasan ibn Sulayman =

Kara-Khanid ruler of Transoxiana (c. 992)

Hasan Bughra Khan
- Bughra Khan
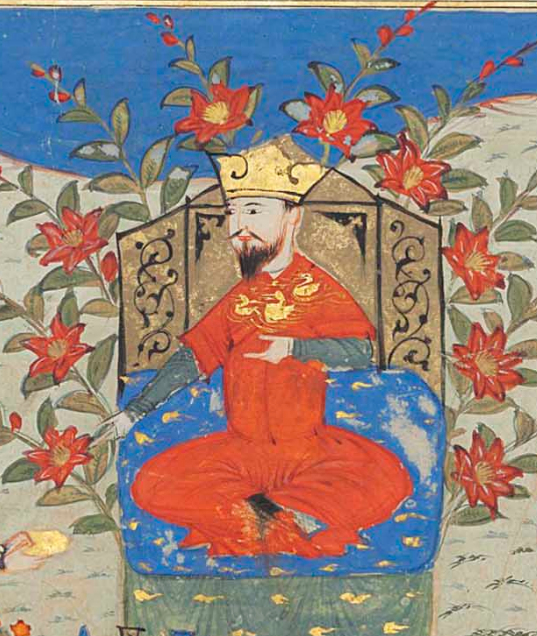
- The accession of Hasan b. Sulayman Bughra Khan in Kashgar. Majma' al-tawarikh (circa 1425)

Ruler of Transoxiana
- Reign: ?–992
- Predecessor: Sulayman Khan
- Successor: Yusuf Qadir Khan
- Died: August 992; Kochkarbashi, Tien Shan
Regnal name
- Sahib ul-Dawla Zahir al-Dawaa Abu Musa Bughra Hasan b. Sulayman
- House: Karakhanid dynasty
- Father: Sulayman Khan
- Religion: Islam

Hasan b. Sulayman Bughra Khan (Middle Turkic: بغرا خان) also known as Harun Bughra Khan, was the ruler of the western part of the Karakhanids as Bughra Khan, ruling nominally under Ali Arslan Khan, but de facto independent. He was the grandson of Satuk Bughra Khan through his second son Sulayman Khan. He inherited his father's appanages in the west sometime later before 990, becoming the founder of the Hasanid branch of the Karakhanid family.

== Reign ==
He invaded Samanid domains in 991 on the invitation of disgruntled vassals and governor of Khorasan - Abu'l-Hasan Simjuri, beginning the Karakhanid-Samanid wars. Immediately he destroyed an army sent by Nuh II and captured Isfijab. Fa'iq, the Samanid governor of Samarkand surrendered to Bughra Khan, who then marched toward Bukhara. Nuh fled, and the Karakhanids entered the capital in the late spring of 992, where they managed to capture Abu Ali Damghani, vizier of Nuh II. He adopted honorific titles "Sahib ud-Dawla" (Possessor of the State) and "Zahir al-Dawaa" (Supporter of the Cause) same year, strucking coins in Ilaq.

== Death ==
Bughra Khan fell sick in Bukhara sometime later and Nuh's uncle Abd al-Aziz the ruler of the Samanid dynasty as a Karakhanid puppet, traveled to Samarkand, and then died on the road northward near Kochkarbashi, Tien Shan.

== Family ==
He had several sons: Yusuf Qadir Khan who inherited his domains in west, Ali Tegin, Muhammad Toghan Khan, Shihab ud-Dawla Suleyman who ruled Uzgen and Adod ud-Dawla Husayn who ruled Ilaq.
