= Kara-Khanid Khanate =

Turkic state in Central Asia from 840 to 1212

- 840–1212
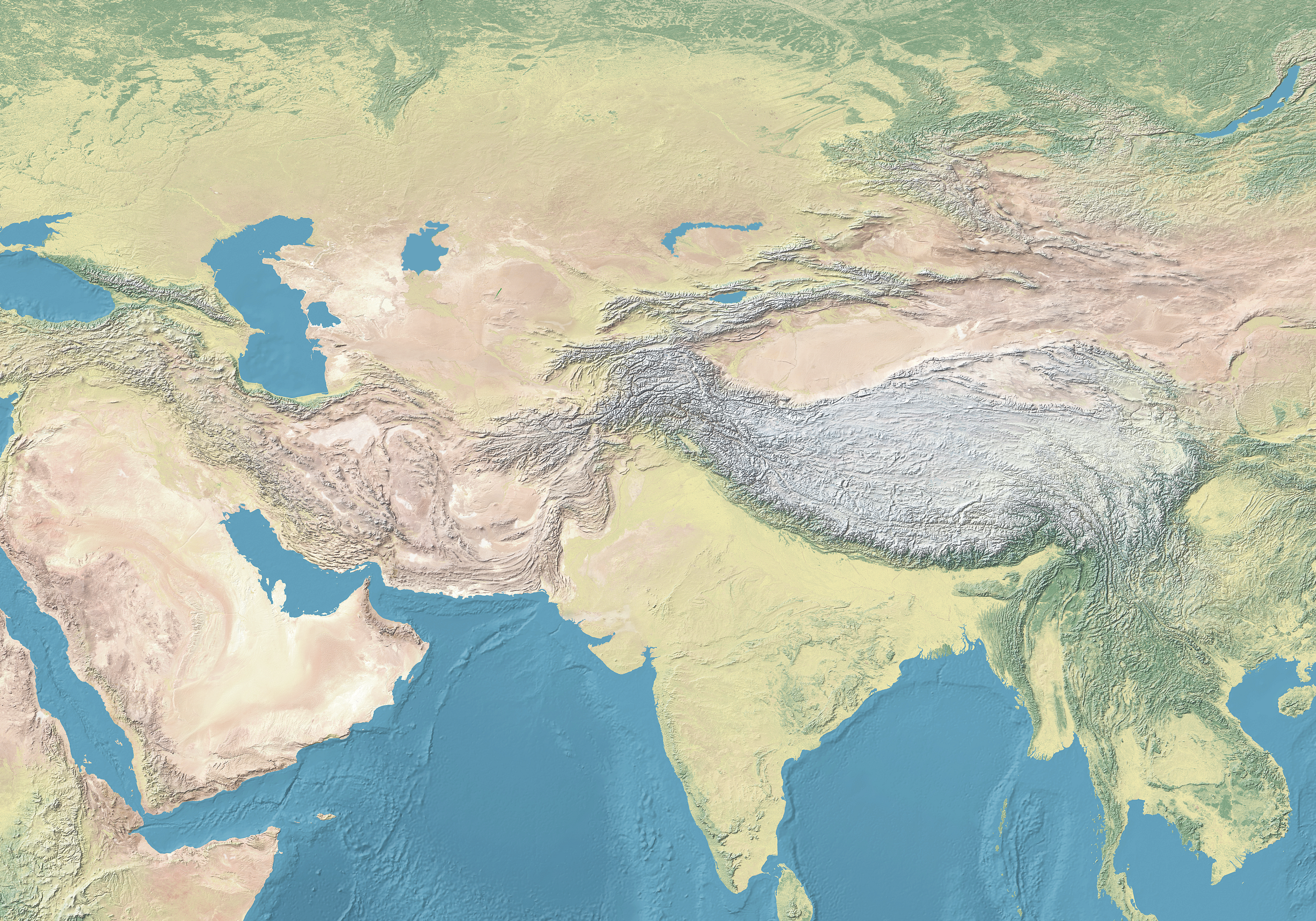
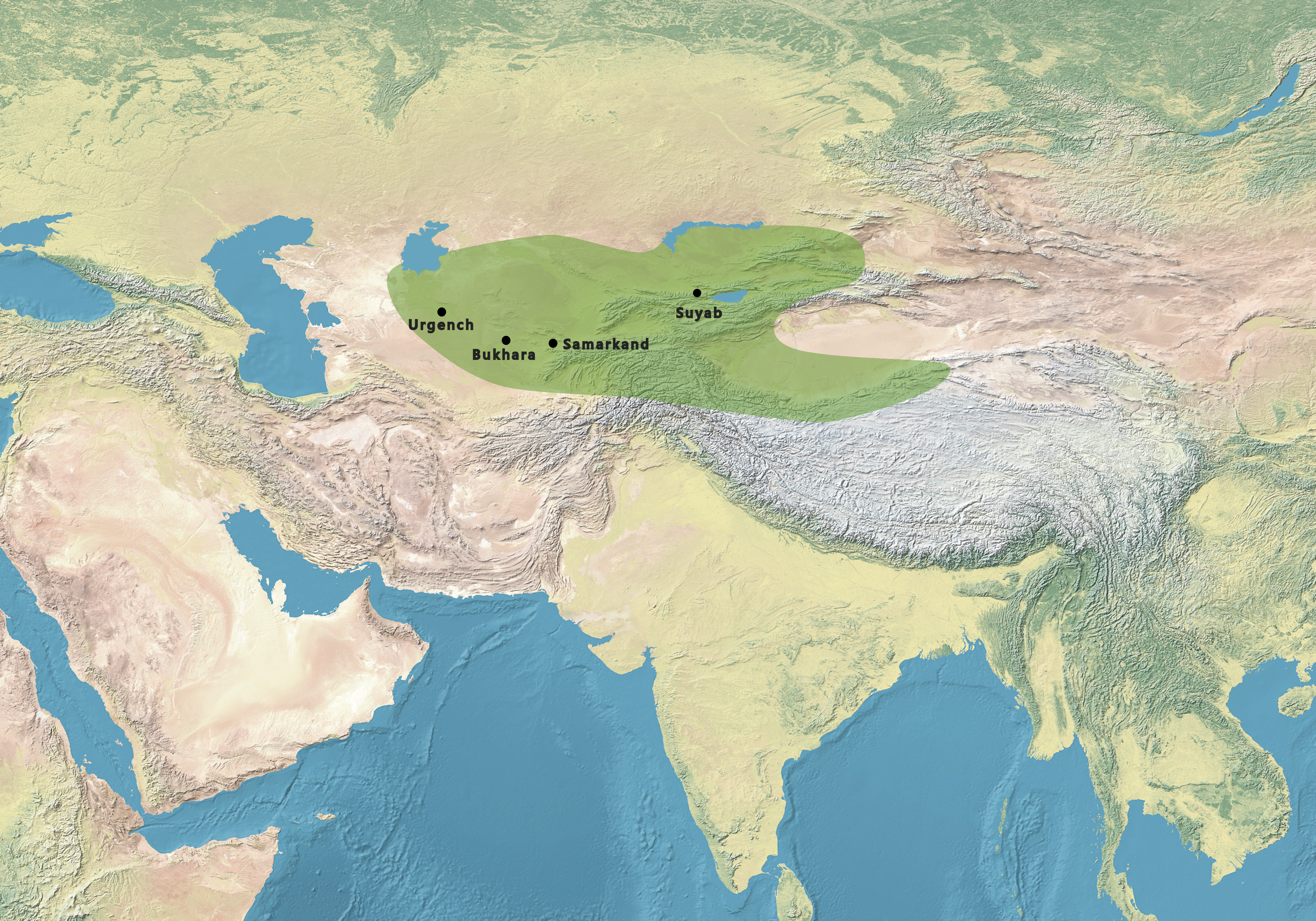
- Kara Khanid Khanate, c. 1000.
- Status: Independent khaganate (840–1089); Seljuk vassal (1089–1141); Qara Khitai vassal (1141–1212)
- Capital: Balasagun (942–1130); Kashgar (1130–1211); Samarkand (1040–1212)
- Common languages: Khaqani Turkic (court, dynastic, literature); Persian (poetry); Arabic (coinage)
- Religion: Nestorian Christianity (840-934); Tengrism (840–934); Buddhism (840–934); Islam (934–1212)
- Government: Monarchy (diarchy)
- Khagan
  - 840–893 (first): Bilge Kul Qadir Khan
  - 1204–1212 (last): Uthman Ulugh-Sultan
- Hajib (chancellor)
  - 11th century: Yūsuf Balasaguni
- History
  - Established: 840
  - Disestablished: 1212
Preceded by
Karluk Yabghu
Uyghur Khaganate
Samanids
Kingdom of Khotan
Succeeded by
Seljuk Empire
Khwarazmian Empire
Qara Khitai

The Kara-Khanid Khanate (Persian: قراخانیان, romanized: Qarākhāniyān; Chinese: 喀喇汗國; pinyin: Kālā Hánguó), also known as the Karakhanids, Qarakhanids, Ilek Khanids or the Afrasiabids (Persian: آل افراسیاب, romanized: Āl-i Afrāsiyāb, lit. 'House of Afrasiab'), was a Karluk Turkic khanate that ruled Central Asia from the 9th to the early 13th century. The dynastic names of Karakhanids and Ilek Khanids refer to royal titles with Kara Khagan being the most important Turkic title up until the end of the dynasty.

The Khanate conquered Transoxiana in Central Asia and ruled it independently between 999 and 1089. Their arrival in Transoxiana signaled a definitive shift from Iranic to Turkic predominance in Central Asia, yet the Kara-khanids gradually assimilated the Perso-Arab Muslim culture, while retaining some of their native Turkic culture. The Khanate split into the Eastern and Western Khanates in the 1040s. In the late 11th century, they came under the suzerainty of the Seljuk Empire followed by the Qara Khitai (Western Liao dynasty) who defeated the Seljuks in the Battle of Qatwan in 1141. The Eastern Khanate ended in 1211, and the Western Khanate was extinguished by the Khwarazmian Empire in 1212.

The capitals of the Kara-Khanid Khanate included Kashgar, Balasagun, Uzgen, and Samarkand. The history of the Kara-Khanid Khanate is reconstructed from fragmentary and often contradictory written sources, as well as studies on their coinage.

== Names ==
The term Karakhanid was derived from Qara Khan or Qara Khaqan (Persian: قراخان, romanized: Qarākhān), the foremost title of the rulers of the dynasty. The Old Turkic word "qara" (𐰴𐰺𐰀) means "black, dark, or north" and khan means ruler. The term was devised by European Orientalists in the 19th century to describe both the dynasty and the Turks ruled by it.

- Arabic Muslim sources called this dynasty al-Khaqaniya ("That of the Khaqans") or al Muluk al-Khaniyya al-Atrak (The Khanal kings of the Turks).
- In his linguistic treatise Dīwān Lughāt al-Turk, Mahmud al-Kashgari, a native-born Karakhanid, listed two endonyms: "Khāqānī Turks" or just "Turks", the latter he also used to denote Turkic peoples in general. (Note: When listing 20 Turkic peoples, Kashgari also included the non-Turkic Kumo Xi (qāy), Khitans (xitāy) Tanguts (taŋut) and Han (Tawγač).)
- Persian sources often used the term Al-i Afrasiyab (Persian: آل افراسیاب, romanized: Āl-i Afrāsiyāb, lit. 'House of Afrisyab') based on a supposed link to the legendary though actually unrelated King Afrasiab of pre-Islamic Transoxania. Kashgari refers to him as Alp Er Tunga.
- They are also referred to as Ilek Khanids or Ilak Khanids (Persian: ایلک خانیان, romanized: Ilak-Khānīyān) in Persian.
- Chinese sources refer to this dynasty as Kalahan (Chinese: 喀喇汗) or Heihan (Chinese: 黑汗, literally "Black Khan") or Dashi (Chinese: 大食, a term for Arabs that extends to Muslims in general).

== History ==
=== Origin ===
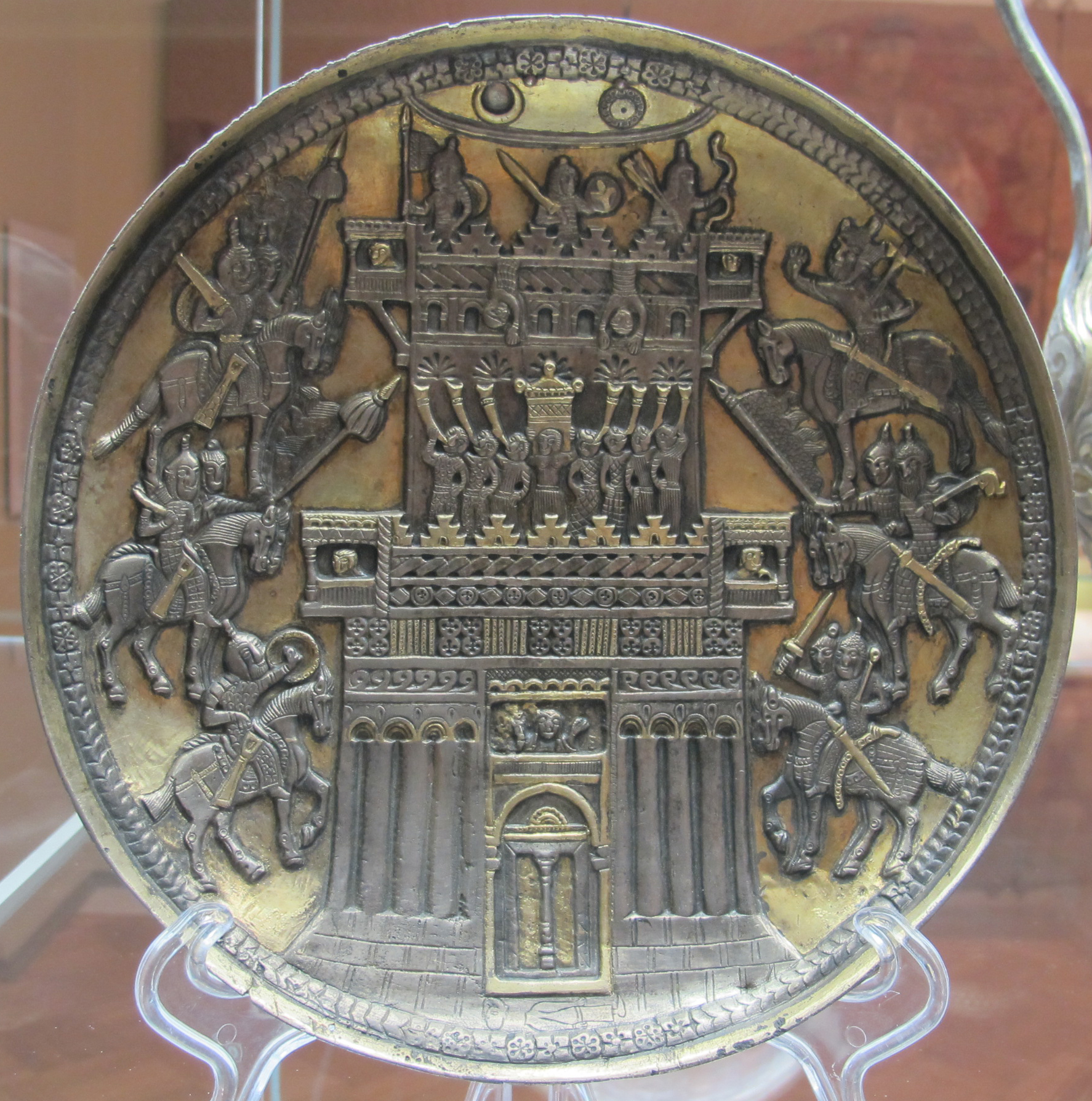
Anikova dish: Nestorian Christian plate with decoration of the Siege of Jericho, probably made by Sogdian artists under Karluk dominion, in Semirechye. Cast silver of the 9th-10th century, copied from an original 8th century plate.

The Kara-Khanid Khanate originated from a confederation formed some time in the 9th century by Karluks, Yagmas, Chigils, Tuhsi, and other peoples living in Zhetysu, Western Tian Shan (modern Kyrgyzstan), and Western Xinjiang around Kashgar. 10th-century Arab historian Al-Masudi listed two "Khagan of Khagans" of the Karluk horde: Sanah, a possible rendition of Ashina (compare Śaya (also by al-Masudi), Aś(i)nas (al-Tabari), Ānsa (Hudud al-'Alam), and Śaba (Ibn Khordadbeh)), and Afrasiab, whom 11th-century Karakhanid scholar Mahmud al-Kashgari identified with Turkic king Alp Er Tunga, the legendary progenitor of the Karakhanid ruling dynasty. Furthermore, Kara-khanid heads of state claimed the title khagan, which indicates that they may have been descended from the Ashina. Even so, the tribal origin of Bilge Kul Qadir Khan, the first Kara-Khan, is still unknown: if Bilge Kul Qadir descended from the Karluk Yabghus, then he indeed belonged to the Ashina dynasty as they did; if Bilge Kul Qadir descended from the Yagma (as suggested by Vasily Bartold), then he did not, considering that the Hudud al-'Alam stated that "Their [Yagmas'] king is from the family of the Toġuzġuz kings", that Ashina tribe was not listed among the Toquz Oghuz (Ch. 九姓 Jĭu Xìng "Nine Surnames") in Chinese-language sources and that early Uyghur khagans belonged to the Yaglakar clan of Toquz Oghuz and later Uyghur khagans belonged to the Ädiz clan. Alternatively, Bilge Kul Qadir might belong to the Eðgiş or Chigils.

==== Early history ====
The Karluks were a nomadic people from the western Altai Mountains who moved to Jetisu. In 742, the Karluks were part of an alliance led by the Basmyls and the Uyghur Khaganate that rebelled against the Göktürks, leading to the demise of the Second Turkic Khaganate (682–744). In the realignment of power that followed, the Karluks were elevated from a tribe led by an Elteber to one led by a yabghu, which was one of the highest Turkic dignitaries and also implies membership in the Ashina clan in whom the "heaven-mandated" right to rule resided. The Karluks and Uyghurs later allied themselves against the Basmyl, and within two years, they toppled the Basmyl khagan. The Uyghur yabghu became khagan and the Karluk leader yabghu. This arrangement lasted less than a year. Hostilities between the Uyghur and Karluk forced the Karluk to migrate westward into the western Turgesh lands.

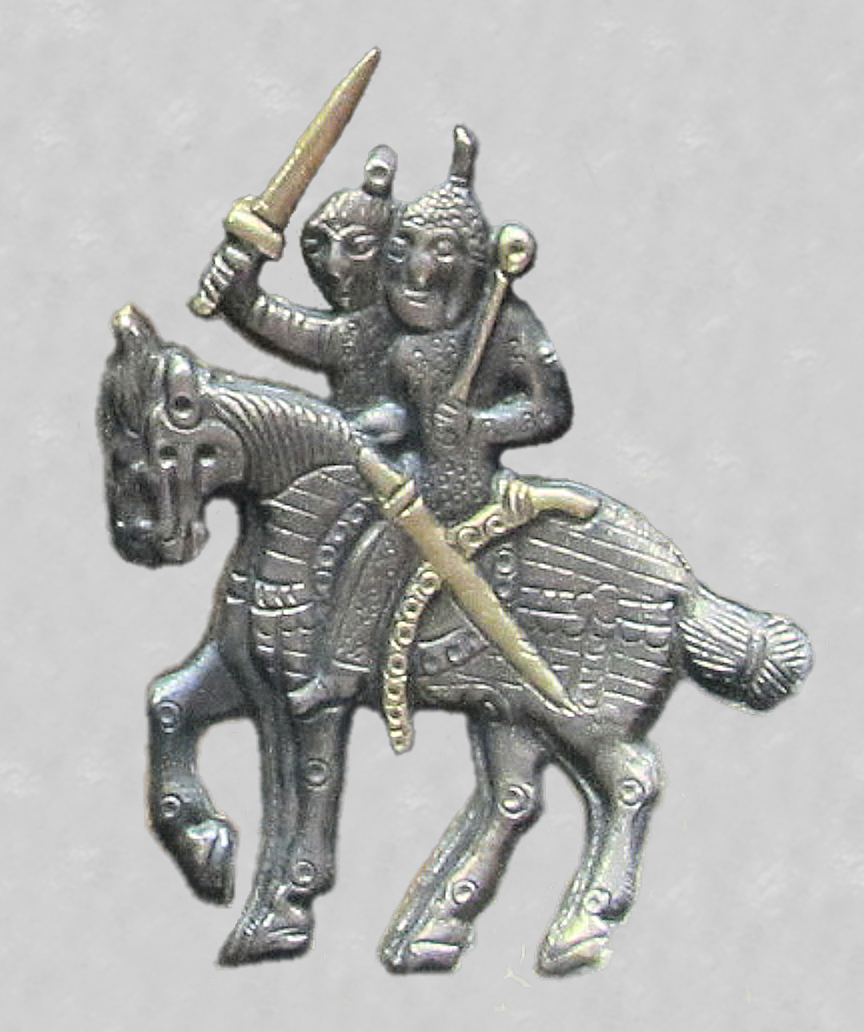
Armoured horsemen on the Anikova dish, Jetisu c. 800.

By 766, the Karluks had forced the submission of the Turgesh, and they established their capital at Suyab on the Chu. The Karluk confederation, by now, included the Chigil and Tukshi tribes, who may have been Türgesh tribes incorporated into the Karluk union. The Karluks converted to Christianity, specifically the Church of the East, at the end of the 8th century, about 15 years after they established themselves in the Jetisu region. This was the first time the Church of the East received such major sponsorship by an eastern power. Remains of a Nestorian church have been found in the Karluk capital of Suyab, as well as hundreds of tomstones with Syriac inscriptions in the Jetisu region.

By the mid-9th century, the Karluk confederation had gained control of the sacred lands of the Western Türks after the destruction of the Uyghur Khaganate by the Old Kirghiz. Control of sacred lands, together with their affiliation with the Ashina clan, allowed the Khaganate to be passed on to the Karluks along with domination of the steppes after the previous Khagan was killed in a revolt.

During the 9th century, southern Central Asia was ruled by the Samanids, while the Central Asian steppe was dominated by Turkic nomads such as the Pechenegs, the Oghuz Turks, and the Karluks. The domain of the Karluks reached as far north as the Irtysh and the Kimek–Kipchak confederation, with encampments extending to the Chi and Ili rivers, where the Chigil and Tukshi tribes lived, and east to the Ferghana valley and beyond. The area to the south and east of the Karluks was inhabited by the Yagma. The Karluk center in the 9th and 10th centuries appears to have been at Balasagun on the Chu. In the late 9th century, the Samanids marched into the steppes and captured Taraz, one of the headquarters of the Karluk khagan, and a large church was transformed into a mosque.

=== Formation of the Kara-Khanid Khanate (840 CE) ===
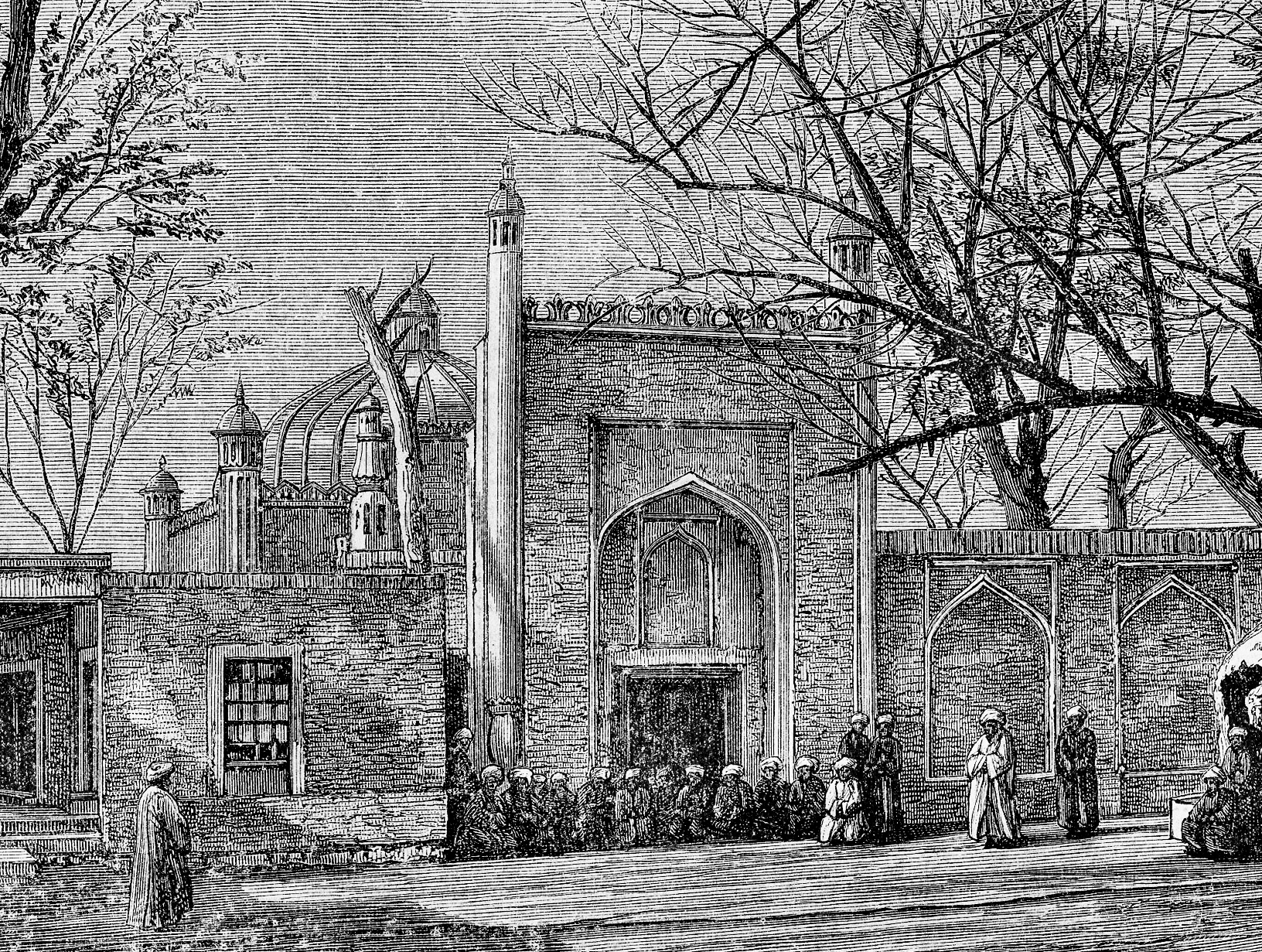
Tomb of Sultan Satuq Bughra Khan (r. 920–955 CE) the first Muslim Khan of the Kara-Khanids, in Artush, Xinjiang

During the 9th century, the Karluk confederation (including three chief tribes: the Bulaq (Mouluo 謀落 / Moula 謀剌), Taşlïk (Tashili 踏實力), and Sebek (Suofu 娑匐) (Note: also known as Chisi in Chinese sources. Golden (1992) hesitantly identifies Chisi with Chuyue, whom he also links to Chigils; Atwood (2010) identified Chisi 熾俟 with Zhusi 朱斯, who were also mentioned in Xiu Tangshu. Atwood does not link Chisi 熾俟 ~ Zhusi 朱斯 to Chuyue 處月, but instead to Zhuxie 朱邪, the original tribal surname of the Shatuo ruling house), along with Chigils, Charuks, Barskhans, Khalajes, Azkishi and Tuhsis (the last three being possibly remnants of Türgesh) and the Yaghma, possible descendants of the Toquz Oghuz, joined forces and formed the first Karluk-Karakhanid khaganate. The Chigils appear to have formed the nucleus of the Karakhanid army. The date of its foundation and the name of its first khan is uncertain, but according to one reconstruction, the first Karakhanid ruler was Bilge Kul Qadir Khan.

The rulers of the Karakhanids were likely to be from the Chigil and Yaghma tribes – the Eastern Khagan bore the title Arslan Qara Khaqan (Arslan "lion" was the totem of the Chigil) and the Western Khagan the title Bughra Qara Khaqan (Bughra "male camel" was the totem of the Yaghma). The names of animals were a regular element in the Turkic titles of the Karakhanids: thus Aslan (lion), Bughra (camel), Toghan (falcon), Böri (wolf), and Toghrul or Toghrïl (a bird of prey). Under the Khagans were four rulers with the titles Arslan Ilig, Bughra Ilig, Arslan Tegin and Bughra Tegin. The titles of the members of the dynasty changed with their position, normally upwards, in the dynastic hierarchy.

=== Conversion to Islam (c. 934 CE) ===
In the mid-10th century the Kara-Khanids converted to Islam and adopted Muslim names and honorifics, but retained Turkic regnal titles such as Khan, Khagan, Ilek (Ilig) and Tegin. Later they adopted the Arab titles sultan and sultān al-salātīn ("Sultan of Sultans"). According to the Ottoman historian known as Munajjim-bashi, a Karakhanid prince named Sultan Satuq Bughra Khan was the first of the khans to convert. After conversion, he obtained a fatwa which permitted him in effect to kill his presumably-still-pagan father, after which he conquered Kashgar (of the old Shule Kingdom). Later, in 960, according to Muslim historians Ibn Miskawaih and Ibn al-Athir, there was a mass conversion of the Turks (reportedly "200,000 tents of the Turks"), and circumstantial evidence suggests these were the Karakhanids.

=== Conquest of Transoxiana ===
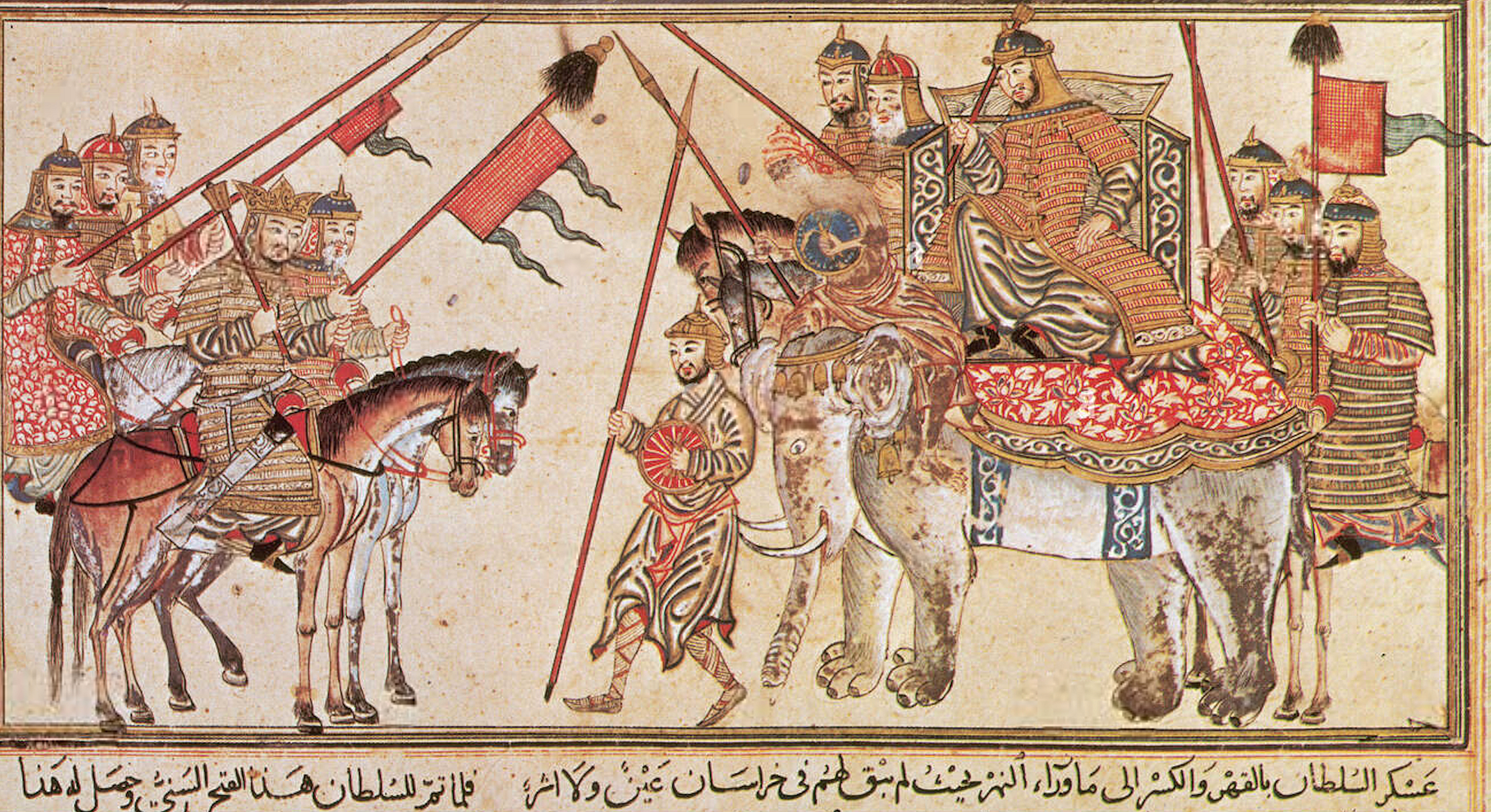
The Kara-Khanid Ilig Khan (left) facing Mahmud of Ghazni riding an elephant in 1017–1018. Jami al-Tawarikh, 1306-14 (Edinburgh Or Ms 20)

The grandson of Satuk Bughra Khan, Hasan b. Sulayman (or Harun) (title: Bughra Khan) attacked the Samanids in the late 10th century. Between 990 and 992, Hasan took Isfijab, Ferghana, Ilaq, Samarkand, and the Samanid capital Bukhara. However, Hasan Bughra Khan died in 992 due to an illness, and the Samanids returned to Bukhara.

Hasan's cousin Ali b. Musa (title: Kara Khan or Arslan Khan) resumed the campaign against the Samanids, and by 999 Ali's son Nasr had taken Chach, Samarkand, and Bukhara. The Samanid domains were divided between the Ghaznavids, who gained Khorasan and Afghanistan, and the Karakhanids, who received Transoxiana. The Oxus River thus became the boundary between the two rival empires.

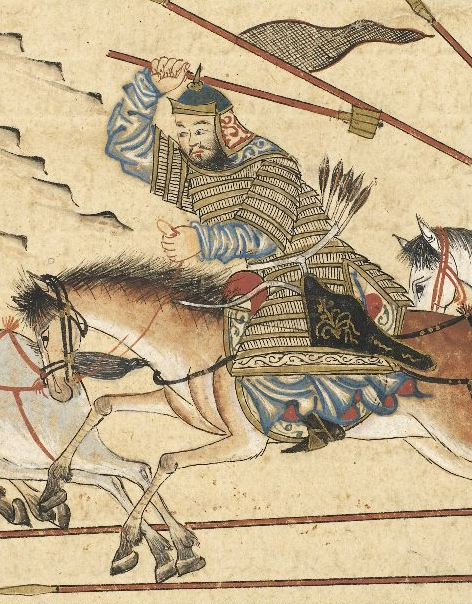
Ahmad ("Ilak Khan Tughan") in battle. Jāmi al-tavārikh, dated 714 (1314–15).

The Karakhanid state was divided into appanages (Ülüş system), as was common of Turkic and Mongol nomads. The Karakhanid appanages were associated with four principal urban centers, Balasagun (then the capital of the Karakhanid state) in Zhetysu, Kashgar in Xinjiang, Uzgen in Fergana, and Samarkand in Transoxiana. The dynasty's original domains of Zhetysu and Kasgar and their khans retained an implicit seniority over those who ruled in Transoxiana and Fergana.

The four sons of Ali (Ahmad, Nasr, Mansur, Muhammad) each held their own independent appanage within the Karakhanid state. Nasr, the conqueror of Transoxiana, held the large central area of Transoxiana (Samarkand and Bukhara), Fergana (Uzgen) and other areas, although after his death his appanage was further divided. Ahmad held Zhetysu and Chach and became the head of the dynasty after the death of Ali. The brothers Ahmad and Nasr conducted different policies towards the Ghaznavids in the south – while Ahmad tried to form an alliance with Mahmud of Ghazna, Nasr attempted to expand unsuccessfully into Ghaznavid territory.

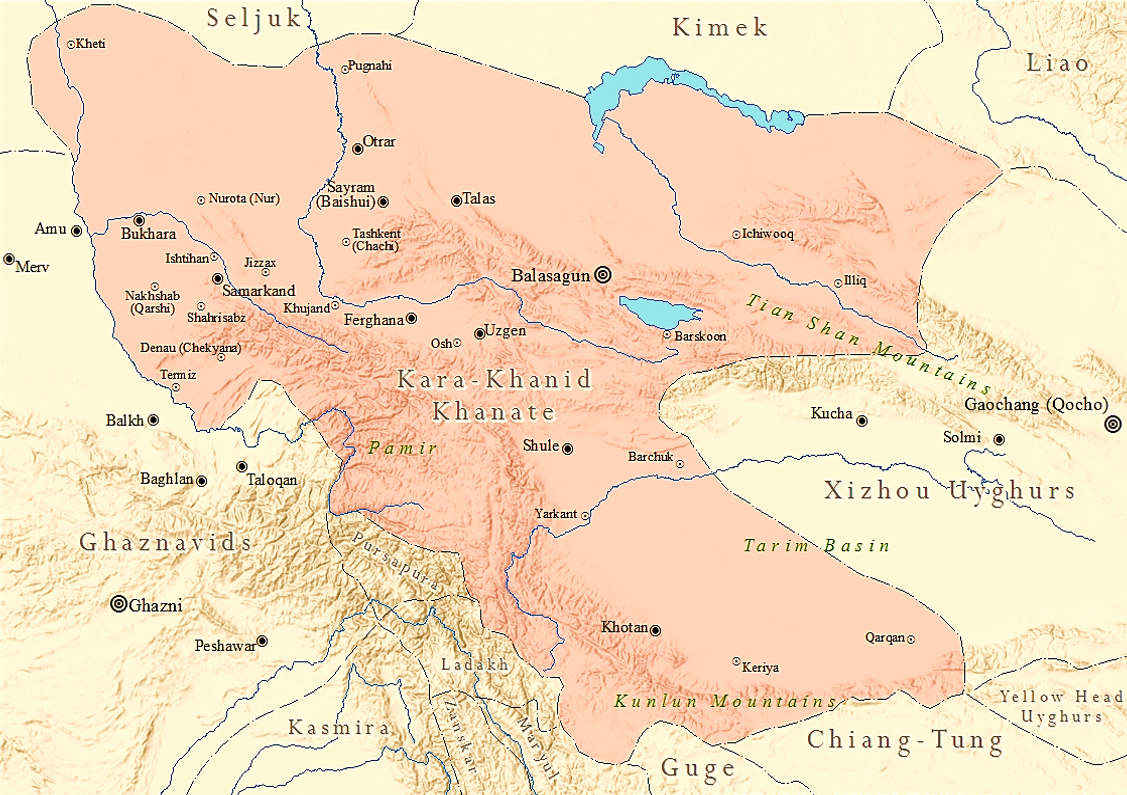
Map of the Kara-Khanid Khanate as of 1006 AD, when it reached its greatest extent

Ahmad was succeeded by Mansur, and after the death of Mansur, the Hasan Bughra Khan branch of the Karakhanids became dominant. Hasan's sons Muhammad Toghan Khan II, and Yusuf Kadir Khan who held Kashgar, became in turn the head of the Karakhanid dynasty. The two families, i.e., the descendants of Ali Arslan Khan and Hasan Bughra Khan, would eventually split the Karakhanid Khanate in two.

In 1017–1018, the Karakhanids repelled an attack by a large mass of nomadic Turkic tribes in what was described in Muslim sources as a great victory. Around the same time, the Kara-Khanid ruler Ilig Khan reached an agreement with Mahmud of Ghazni, in which they agreed to partition former Samanid territory along the Oxus river.

=== Conquest of the western Tarim Basin ===
The Muslim conquest of the Buddhist cities east of Kashgar began when the Kara-Khanid khaghan Abdulkarim Satuq Bughra converted to Islam in 934 and then captured Kashgar. He and his son directed endeavors to proselytize Islam among the Turks and engage in military conquests. In the mid-10th century, Satuq's son Musa began to put pressure on Khotan, and a long period of war between Kashgar and the Kingdom of Khotan ensued. Satok Bughra Khan's nephew or grandson Ali Arslan was said to have been killed by Buddhists during the war; during the reign of Ahmad ibn Ali, the Karakhanids also engaged in wars against non-Muslims to the east and northeast.

Muslim accounts tell the tale of the four imams from Mada'in (possibly in Iraq) who travelled to help Yusuf Qadir Khan, the Kara-Khanid khaghan, in his conquest of Khotan, Yarkend, and Kashgar. The "infidels" were said to have been driven towards Khotan, but the four Imams were killed. In 1006, Yusuf Qadir Khan of Kashgar conquered the Kingdom of Khotan, ending Khotan's existence as an independent state.

This conquest of the western Tarim Basin, which includes Khotan and Kashgar is significant as the second wave of the Turkic settlement of the Tarim Basin, and modern Uyghurs identify with the Karakhanids even though the name Uyghur was taken from the Manichaean Uyghur Khaganate and the Buddhist state of Qocho.

=== Division of the Kara-Khanid Khanate ===
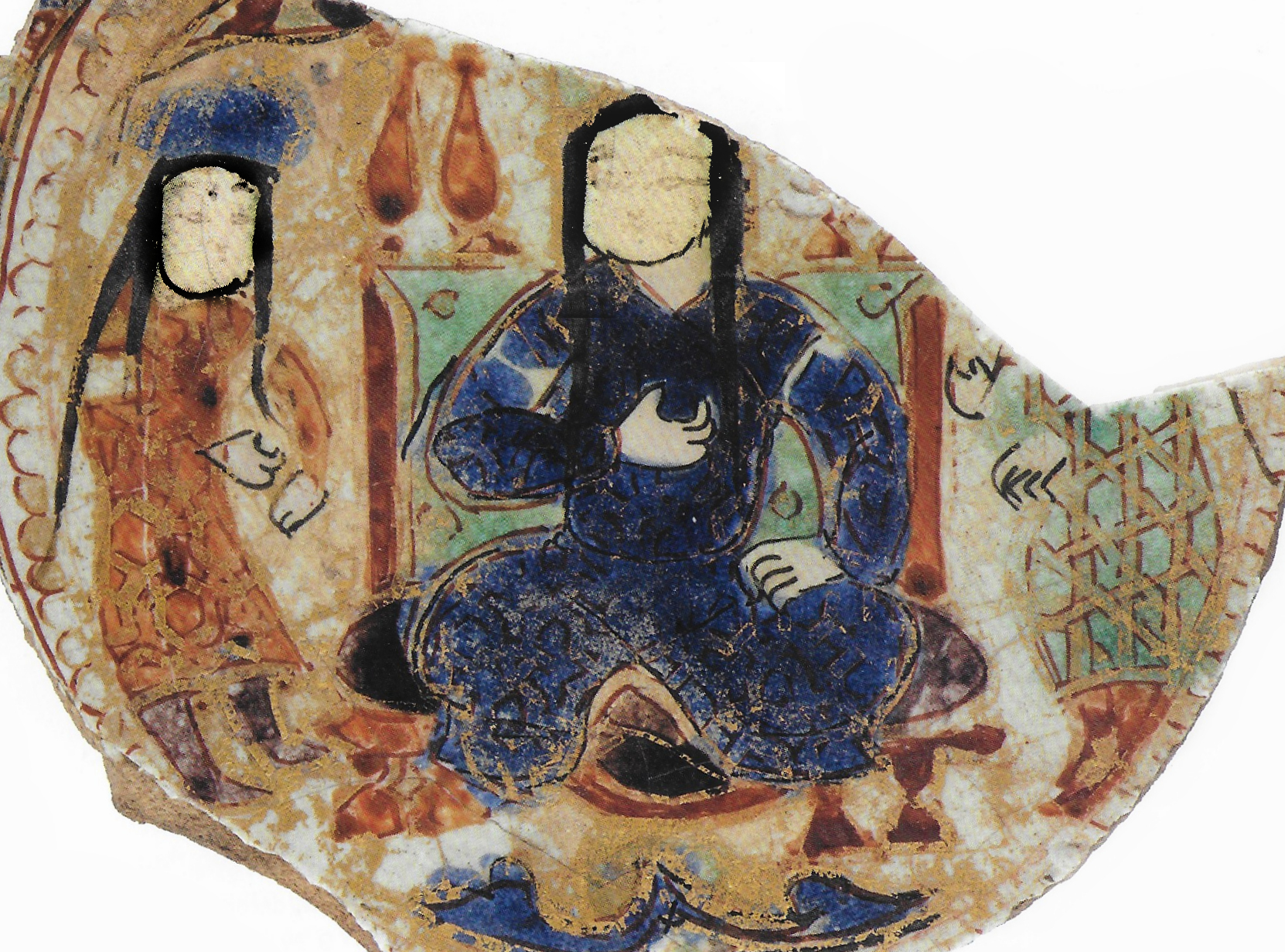
Prince on his throne, with standing courtiers, Afrasiyab, Samarkand, dated 1170–1220 CE. National History Museum of Samarkand.

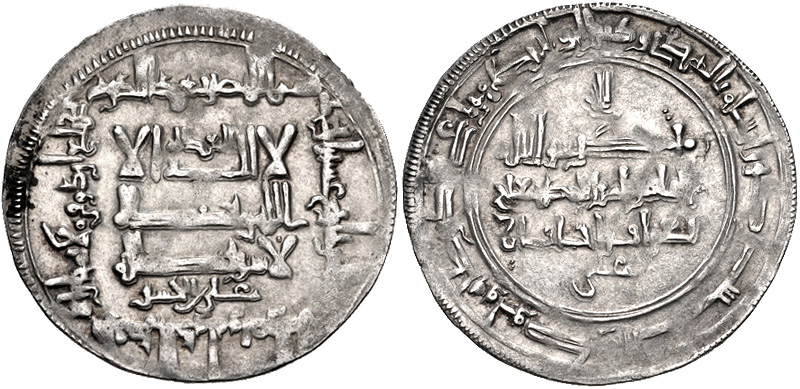
Dirham of Kara-Khanid ruler Ali-Tegin, minted at Dabusiyya in 1032/3.

Early in the 11th century the unity of the Karakhanid dynasty was fractured by frequent internal warfare that eventually resulted in the formation of two independent Karakhanid states. A son of Hasan Bughra Khan, Ali Tegin, seized control of Bukhara and other towns. He expanded his territory further after the death of Mansur. The son of Nasr, Böritigin, later waged war against the sons of Ali Tegin, and won control of a large part of Transoxiana, making Samarkand the capital. In 1041, another son of Nasr b. Ali, Muhammad 'Ayn ad-Dawlah (reigned 1041–52) took over the administration of the western branch of the family that eventually led to a formal separation of the Khara-Khanid Khanate. Ibrahim Tamghach Khan was considered by Muslim historians as a great ruler, and he brought some stability to the Western Karakhanids by limiting the appanage system that caused much of the internal strife in the Kara-Khanid Khanate.

The Hasan family remained in control of the Eastern Khanate. The Eastern Khanate had its capital at Balasaghun and later Kashgar. The Fergana-Zhetysu areas became the border between the two states and were frequently contested. When the two states were formed, Fergana fell into realm of the Eastern Khanate, but was later captured by Ibrahim and became part of the Western Khanate.

=== Seljuk suzerainty ===
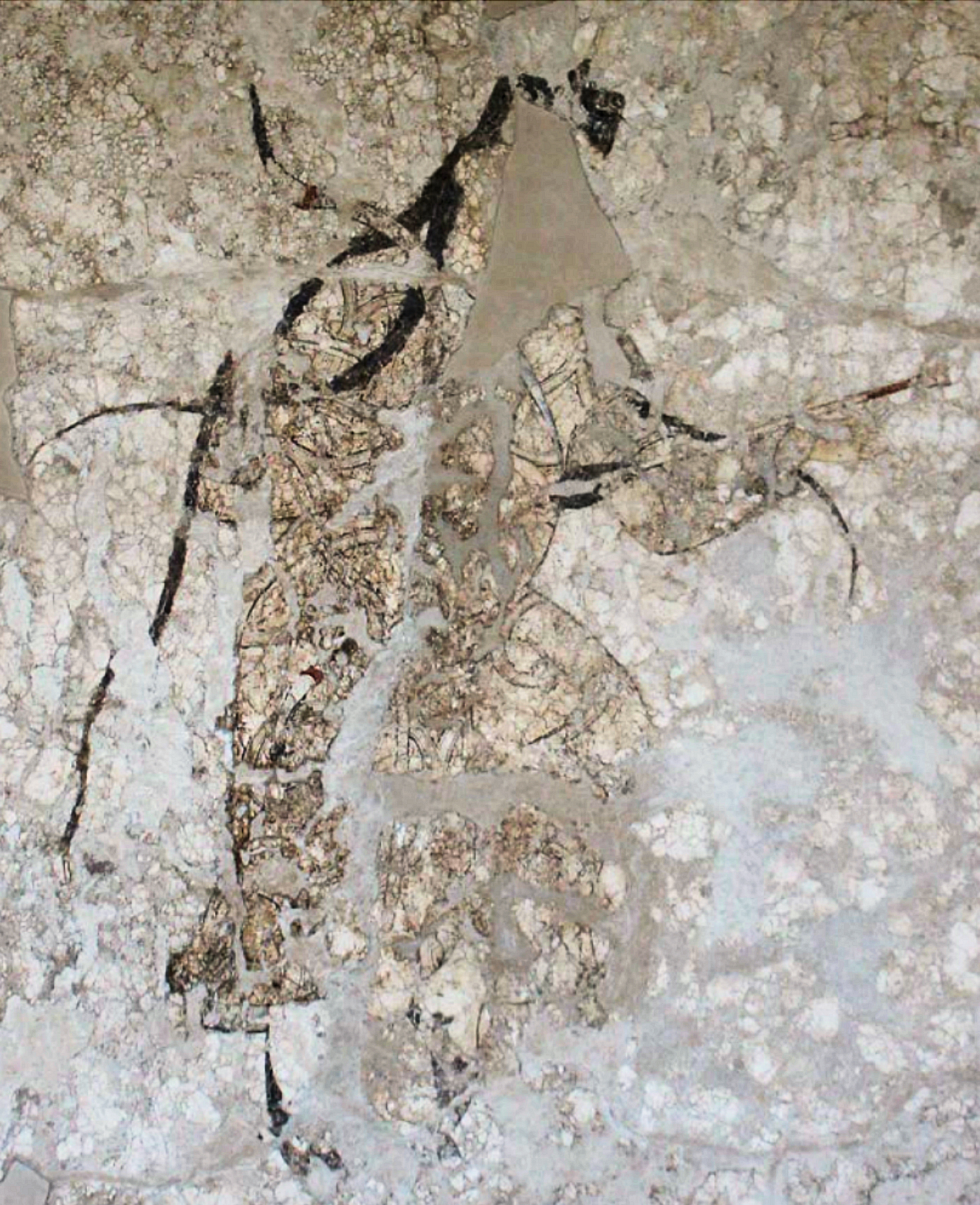
Kara-Khanid bowman with characteristic Turkic long braids, Afrasiab, circa 1200 CE.

In 1040, the Seljuk Empire defeated the Ghaznavids at the Battle of Dandanaqan and entered Iran. Conflict with the Karakhanids broke out, but the Karakhanids were able to withstand attacks by the Seljuks initially, even briefly taking control of Seljuk towns in Greater Khorasan. The Karakhanids, however, developed serious conflicts with the religious classes (the ulama), and the ulama of Transoxiana then requested the intervention of the Seljuks. In 1089, during the reign of Ibrahim's grandson Ahmad b. Khidr, the Seljuks entered and took control of Samarkand, together with the domains belonging to the Western Khanate. For half a century, the Western Karakhanid Khanate was a vassal of the Seljuks, who largely controlled the appointment of the Khanate's rulers in that time. Ahmad b. Khidr was returned to power by the Seljuks, but in 1095, the ulama accused Ahmad of heresy and managed to secure his execution.

The Karakhanids of Kashgar also declared their submission following a Seljuk campaign into Talas and Zhetysu, but the Eastern Khanate was a Seljuk vassal for only a short time. At the beginning of the 12th century the Eastern Khanate invaded Transoxiana and briefly occupied the Seljuk town of Termez.

=== Qara Khitai invasion ===
The Qara Khitai (Western Liao dynasty) host which invaded Central Asia was composed of remnants from the defunct Liao dynasty which was annihilated by the Jin dynasty in 1125. The Liao noble Yelü Dashi recruited warriors from various tribes and formed a horde that moved westward to rebuild the Liao dynasty. Yelü occupied Balasagun on the Chu River, then defeated the Western Karakhanids in Khujand in 1137. In 1141, the Qara Khitai became the dominant force in the region after they dealt a devastating blow to the Seljuk Sultan Ahmad Sanjar and the Kara-Khanids at the Battle of Qatwan near Samarkand. Several military commanders of Karakhanid lineages such as the father of Osman of Khwarazm fled from Karakhanid lands in the wake of the Qara Khitai invasion.

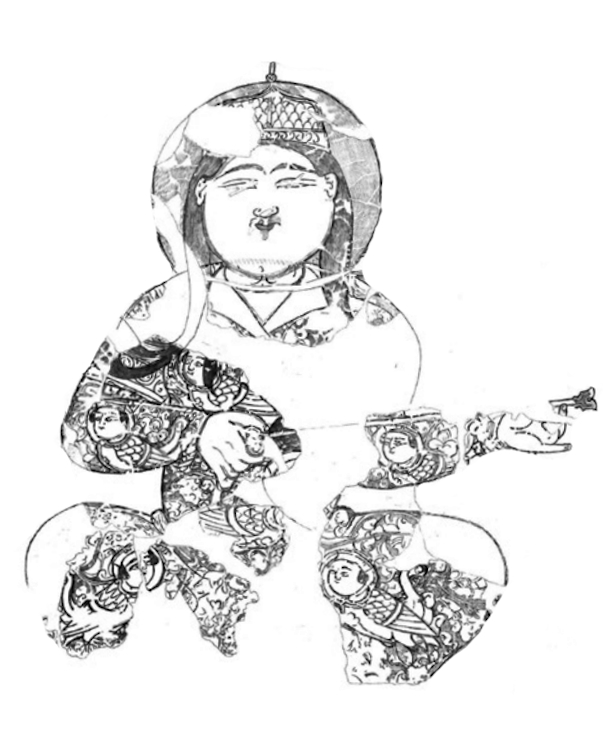
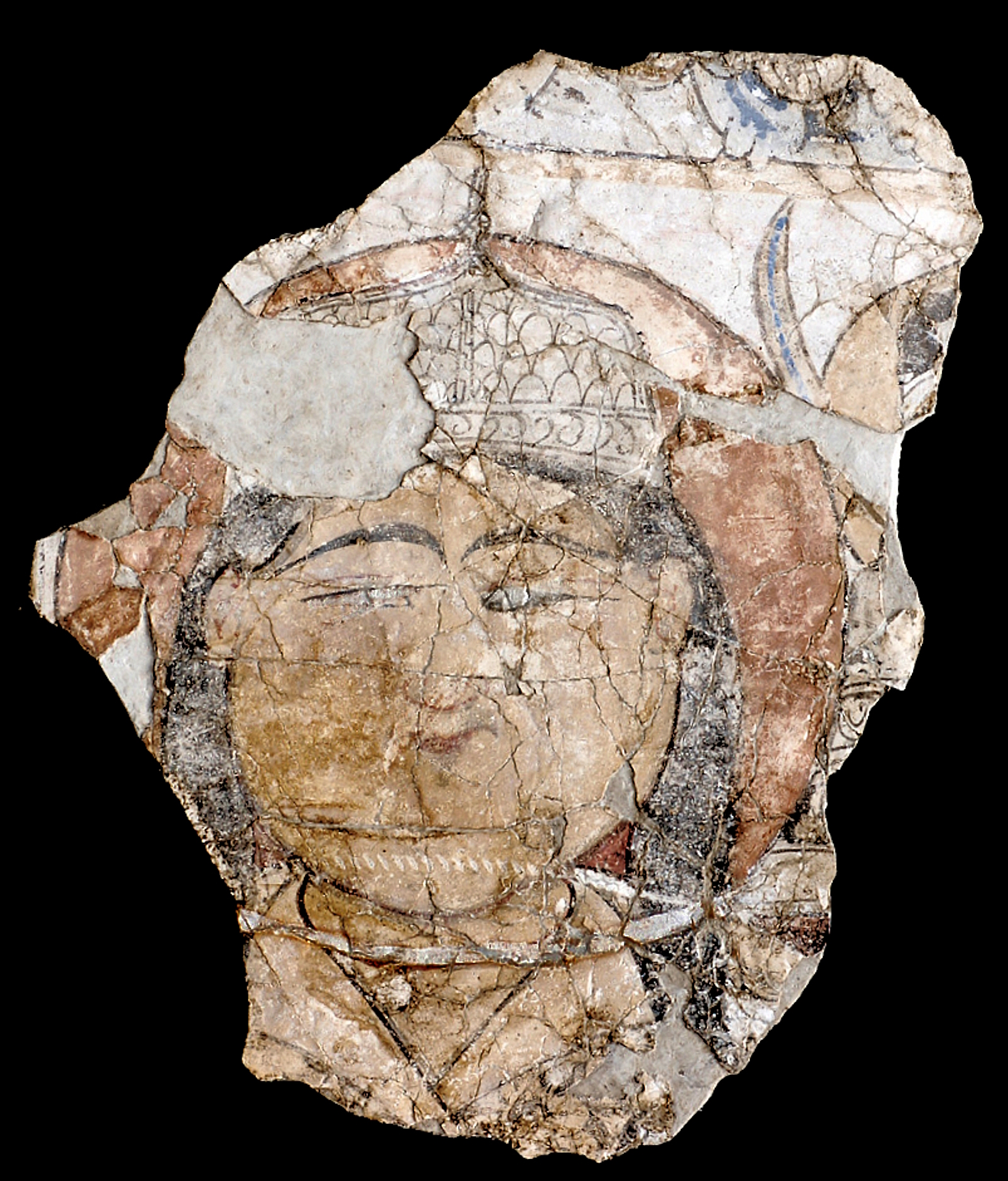
Detail of a Kara-Khanid ruler, probably Uthman ibn Ibrahim, sitting cross-legged, and holding a double-headed arrow, a royal attribute. Afrasiab, Samarkand, circa 1200 CE. The portrait was possibly defaced in 1212 when the Khwarazmian Empire shah Muḥammad b. Tekish took over Samarkand.

Despite losing to the Qara Khitai, the Karakhanid dynasty remained in power as their vassals. The Qara Khitai themselves stayed at Zhetysu near Balasagun, and allowed some of the Karakhanids to continue to rule as their tax collectors in Samarkand and Kashgar. Under the Qara Khitai the Karakhanids functioned as administrators for sedentary Muslim populations. While the Qara Khitai were Buddhists ruling over a largely Muslim population, they were considered fair-minded rulers whose reign was marked by religious tolerance. Islamic religious life continued uninterrupted and Islamic authority persevered under the Qara Khitai. Kashgar became a Nestorian metropolitan see and Christian gravestones in the Chu River Valley appeared beginning in this period. However, Kuchlug, a Naiman who usurped the throne of the Qara Khitai dynasty, instituted anti-Islamic policies on the local populations under his rule.

=== Downfall ===
The decline of the Seljuks following their defeat by the Qara Khitai at the Battle of Qatwan (1141) allowed the Khwarazmian dynasty, then a vassal of the Qara Khitai, to expand into former Seljuk territory, where they became independent rulers circa 1190. In 1207, the citizens of Bukhara revolted against the sadrs (leaders of the religious classes), which the Khwarazmshah 'Ala' ad-Din Muhammad used as a pretext to conquer Bukhara. Muhammad then formed an alliance with the Western Karakhanid ruler Uthman ibn Ibrahim (who later married Muhammad's daughter) against the Qara Khitai. In 1210, the Khwarezm-Shah took Samarkand after the Qara Khitai retreated to deal with the rebellion from the Naiman Kuchlug, who had seized the Qara Khitans' treasury at Uzgen. The Khwarezm-Shah then defeated the Qara Khitai near Talas. Muhammad and Kuchlug had, apparently, agreed to divide up the Qara Khitan's empire. In 1212, the population of Samarkand staged a revolt against the Khwarezmians, a revolt which Uthman supported, and massacred them. The Khwarezm-Shah returned, recaptured Samarkand and executed Uthman. He demanded the submission of all leading Karakhanids, and finally extinguished the Western Karakhanid state.

In 1204, a rebellion of the Eastern Kara-Khanid in Kashgar was suppressed by the Kara-Khitai who took the prince Yusuf hostage to Balasagun. The prince was later released but he was killed in Kashgar by the rebels in 1211, effectively ending the Eastern Kara-Khanid. In 1214, the rebels in Kashgar surrendered to Kuchlug, who had usurped the Kara-Khitai throne. In 1218, Kuchlug was killed by the Mongol army. Some of the Kara-Khitai's eastern vassals including Eastern Kara-Khanids then joined the Mongol forces to conquer the Khwarezmian Empire.

== Culture ==
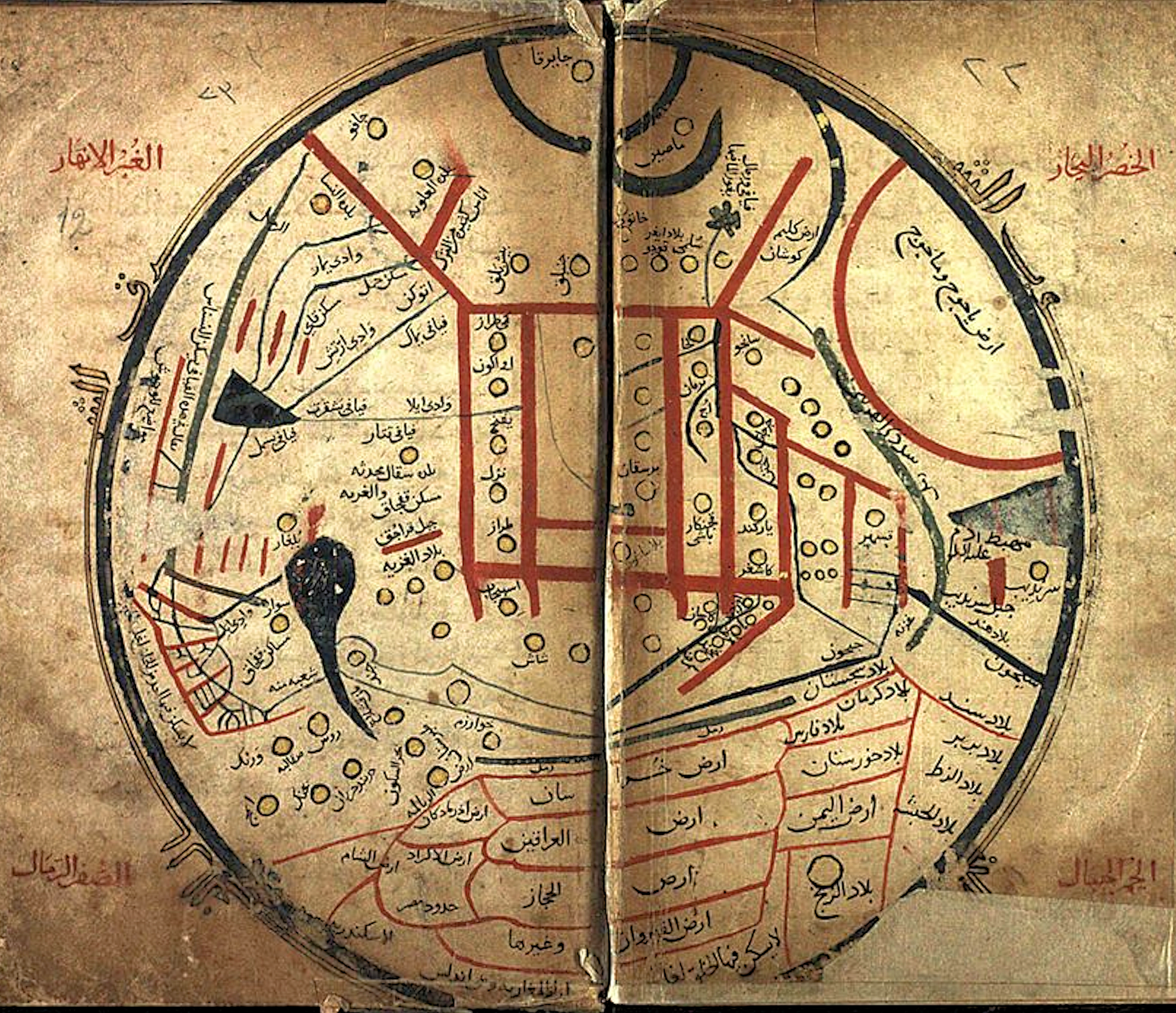
Early world map from Dīwān Lughāt al-Turk ("Compendium of the languages of the Turks"), an Arab-Turkish dictionary by the Kara-Khanid writer Mahmud al-Kashgari, written in Seljuk Baghdad in 1072-74 CE (1266 copy).

The takeover by the Karakhanids did not change the essentially Iranian character of Central Asia, though it set into motion a demographic and ethnolinguistic shift. During the Karakhanid era, the local population began using Turkic in speech – initially the shift was linguistic with the local people adopting the Turkic language. While Central Asia became Turkicized over the centuries, culturally the Turks came close to being Persianized or, in certain respects, Arabicized. Nevertheless, the official or court language used in Kashgar and other Karakhanid centers, referred to as "Khaqani" (royal), remained Turkic. The language was partly based on dialects spoken by the Turkic tribes that made up the Karakhanids and possessed qualities of linear descent from Kök and Karluk Turkic. The Turkic script was also used for all documents and correspondence of the khaqans, according to Dīwānu l-Luġat al-Turk.

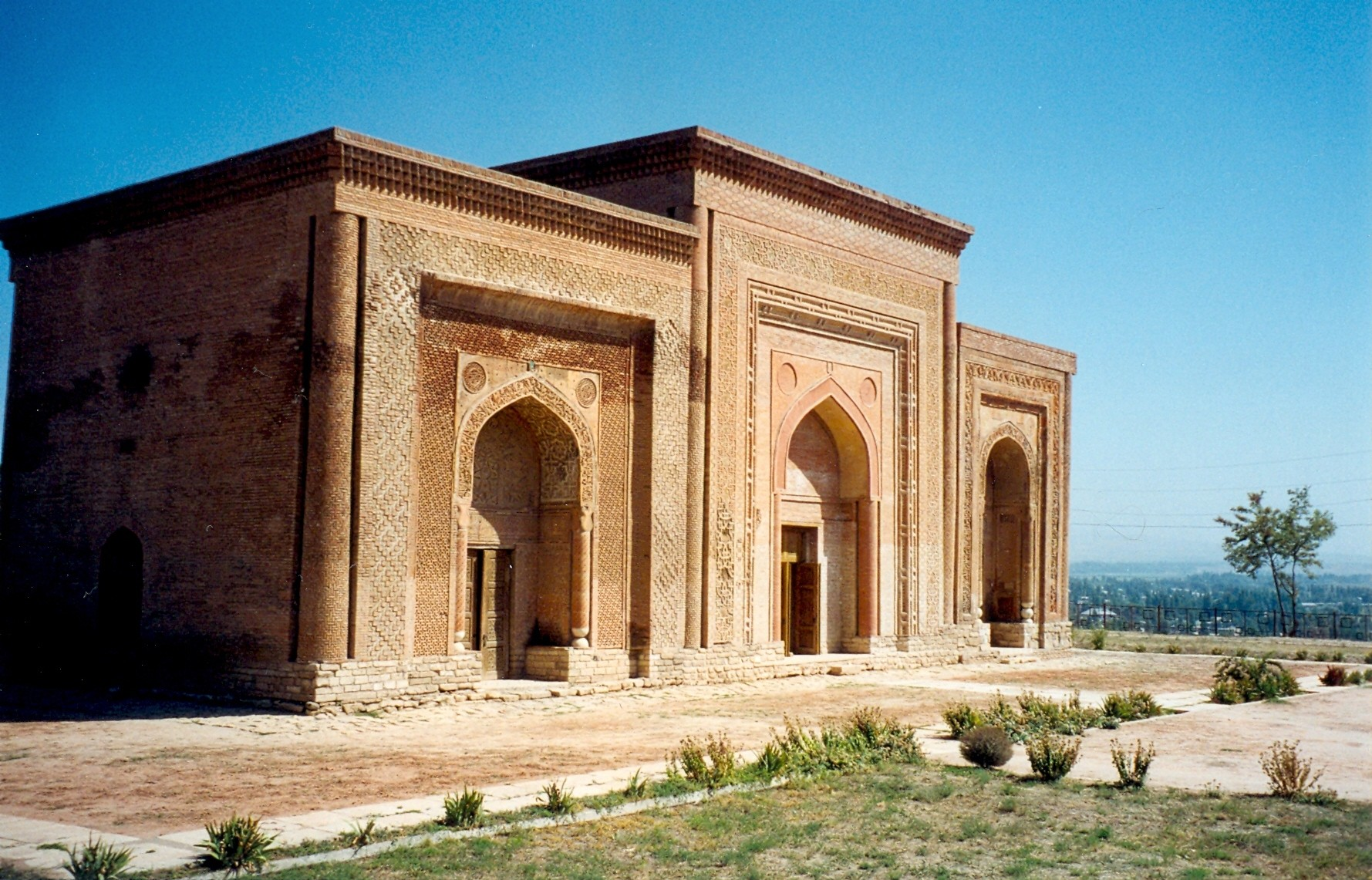
11th–12th-century Karakhanid mausolea in Uzgen, Kyrgyzstan.

The Dīwānu l-Luġat al-Turk (Dictionary of Languages of the Turks) was written by a prominent Karakhanid historian, Mahmud al-Kashgari, who may have lived for some time in Kashgar at the Karakhanid court. He wrote this first comprehensive dictionary of Turkic languages in Arabic for the Caliphs of Baghdad in 1072–76. Another famous Karakhanid writer was Yusuf Balasaghuni, who wrote Kutadgu Bilig (The Wisdom of Felicity), the only known literary work written in Turkic from the Karakhanid period. Kutadgu Bilig is a form of advice literature known as mirrors for princes. The Turkic identity is evident in both of these pieces of work, but they also showed the influences of Persian and Islamic culture. However, the court culture of the Karakhanids remained almost entirely Persian. The two last western khaqans also wrote poetry in Persian.

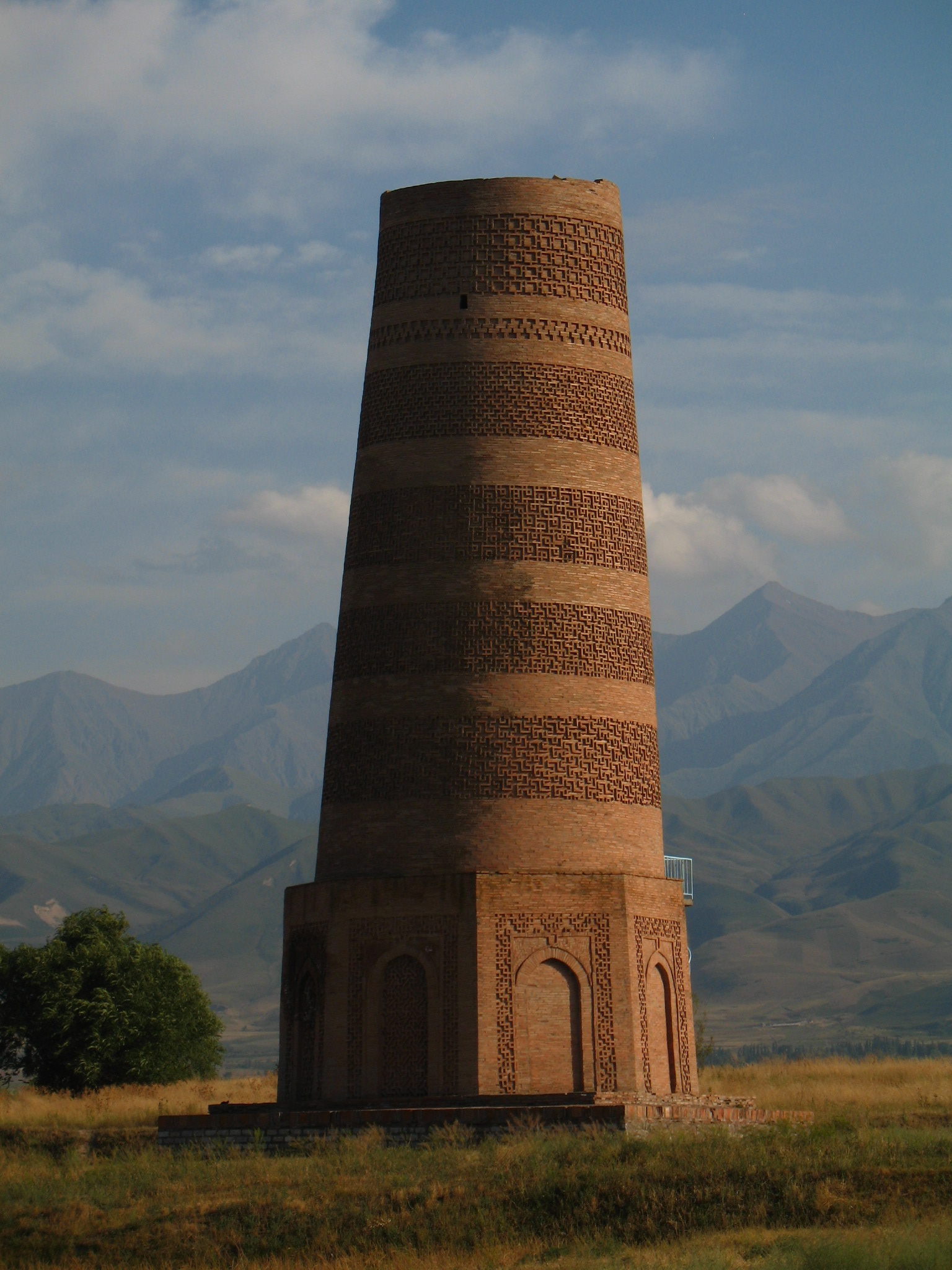
The Burana Tower, an early Kara-Khanid minaret built in Balasagun in the 11th century.

The Cambridge World History describes the Kara-Khanid state as the first of the Islamic Turco-Iranian states.

Islam and its civilization flourished under the Karakhanids. The earliest example of madrasas in Central Asia was founded in Samarkand by Ibrahim Tamghach Khan. Ibrahim also founded a hospital to care for the sick as well as providing shelter for the poor. His son Shams al-Mulk Nasr built ribats for the caravanserais on the route between Bukhara and Samarkand, as well as a palace near Bukhara. Some of the buildings constructed by the Karakhanids still survive today, including the Kalyan minaret built by Mohammad Arslan Khan beside the main mosque in Bukhara, and three mausolea in Uzgend. The early Karakhanid rulers, as nomads, lived not in the city but in an army encampment outside the capital, and while by the time of Ibrahim the Karakhanids still maintained a nomadic tradition, their extensive religious and civil constructions showed that they had assimilated the culture and traditions of the settled population of Transoxiana. During the excavations of the citadel of Samarkand, the ruins of the palace of the Karakhanid ruler Ibrahim ibn Hussein (1178–1202) were found. The palace was decorated with wall paintings.

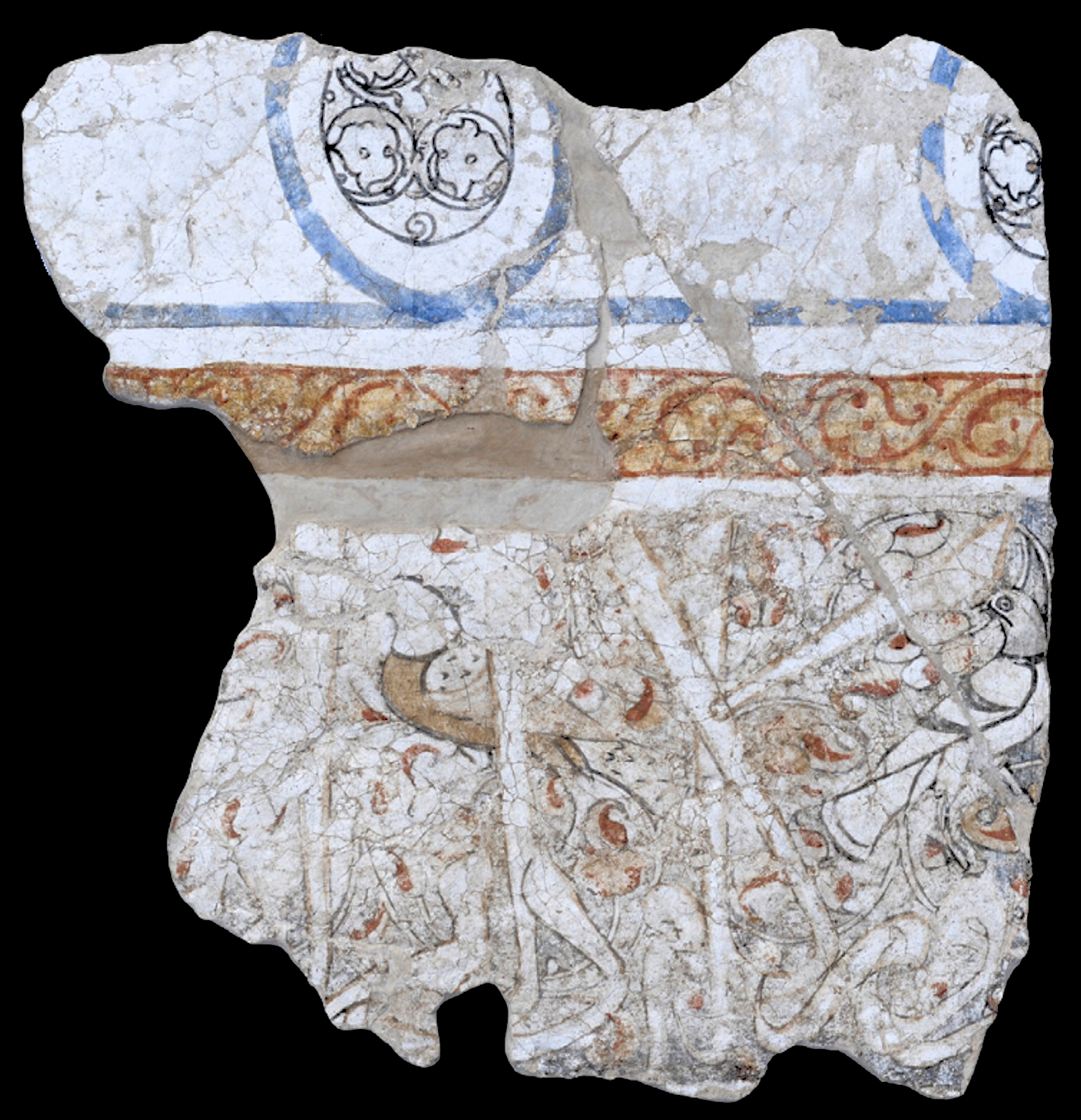
Kara-Khanid band of inscription containing a fragment of poetry reading kām-i dil, Afrasiab, Samarkand, circa 1200 CE.

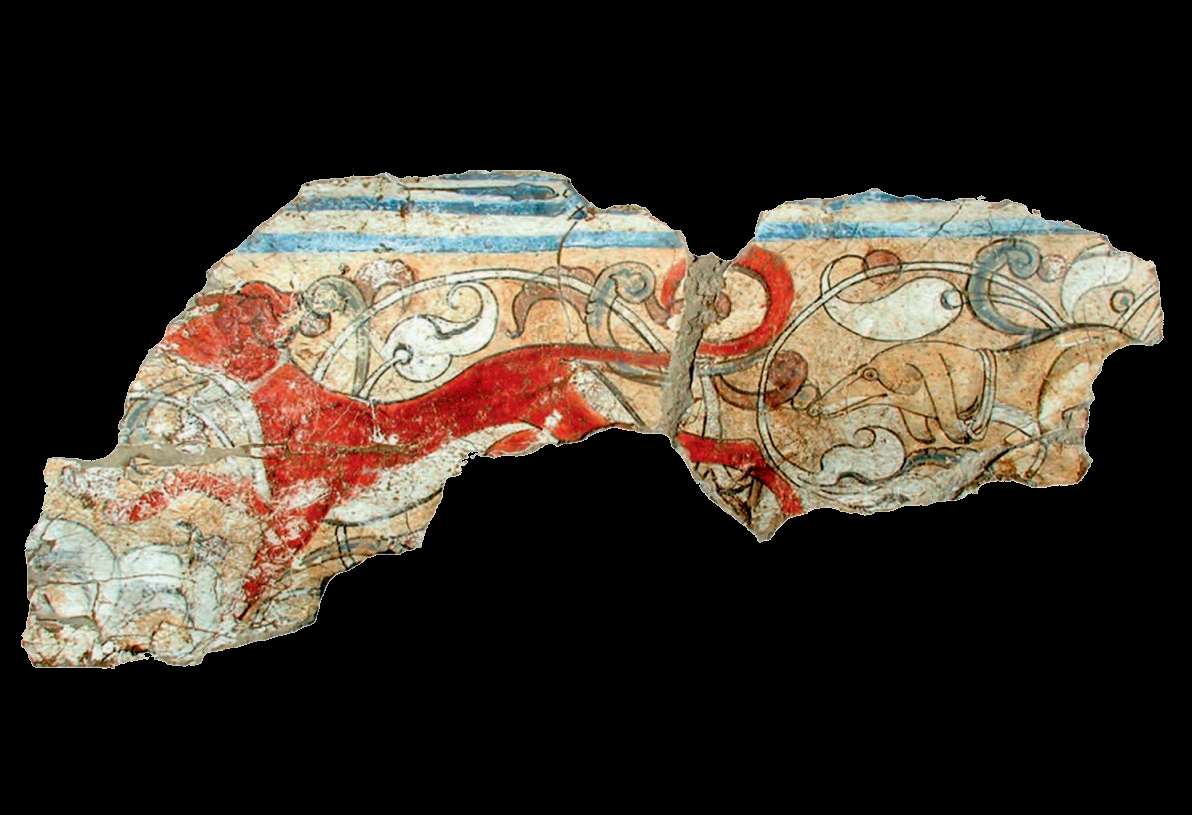
Kara-Khanid bands of inscription with running animals, Afrasiab, Samarkand, circa 1200 CE.

Numerous works of art and decorative objects are also known from the realm of the Kara-Khanids during the time of their rule (840–1212). Samarkand, with its old citadel of Afrasiab where many works of art have been excavated, was conquered by the Kara-Khanids between 990 and 992, and held until 1212 (11th–12th centuries):

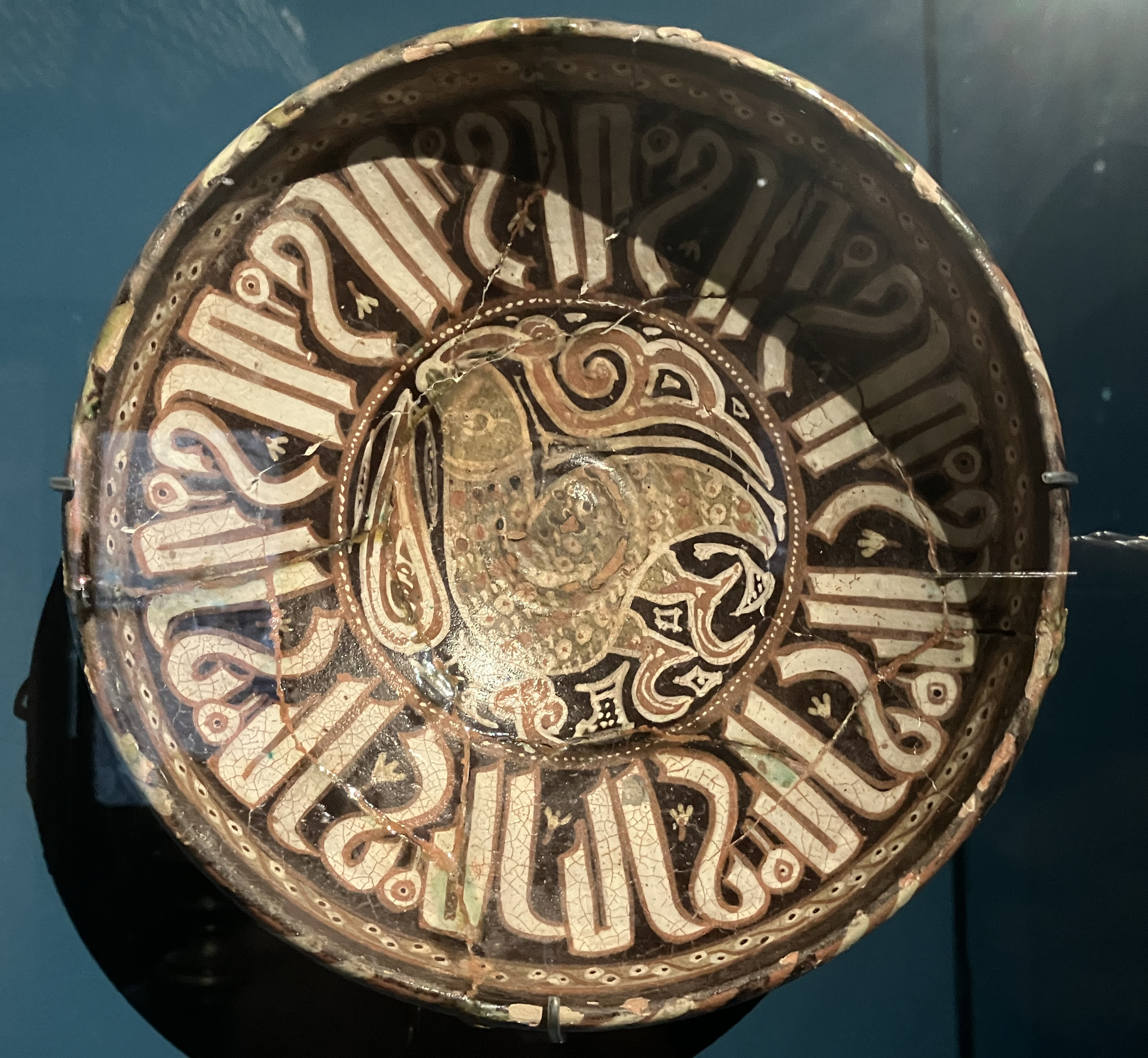
Bowl with bird. Afrasiab (Samarkand), 11th century.

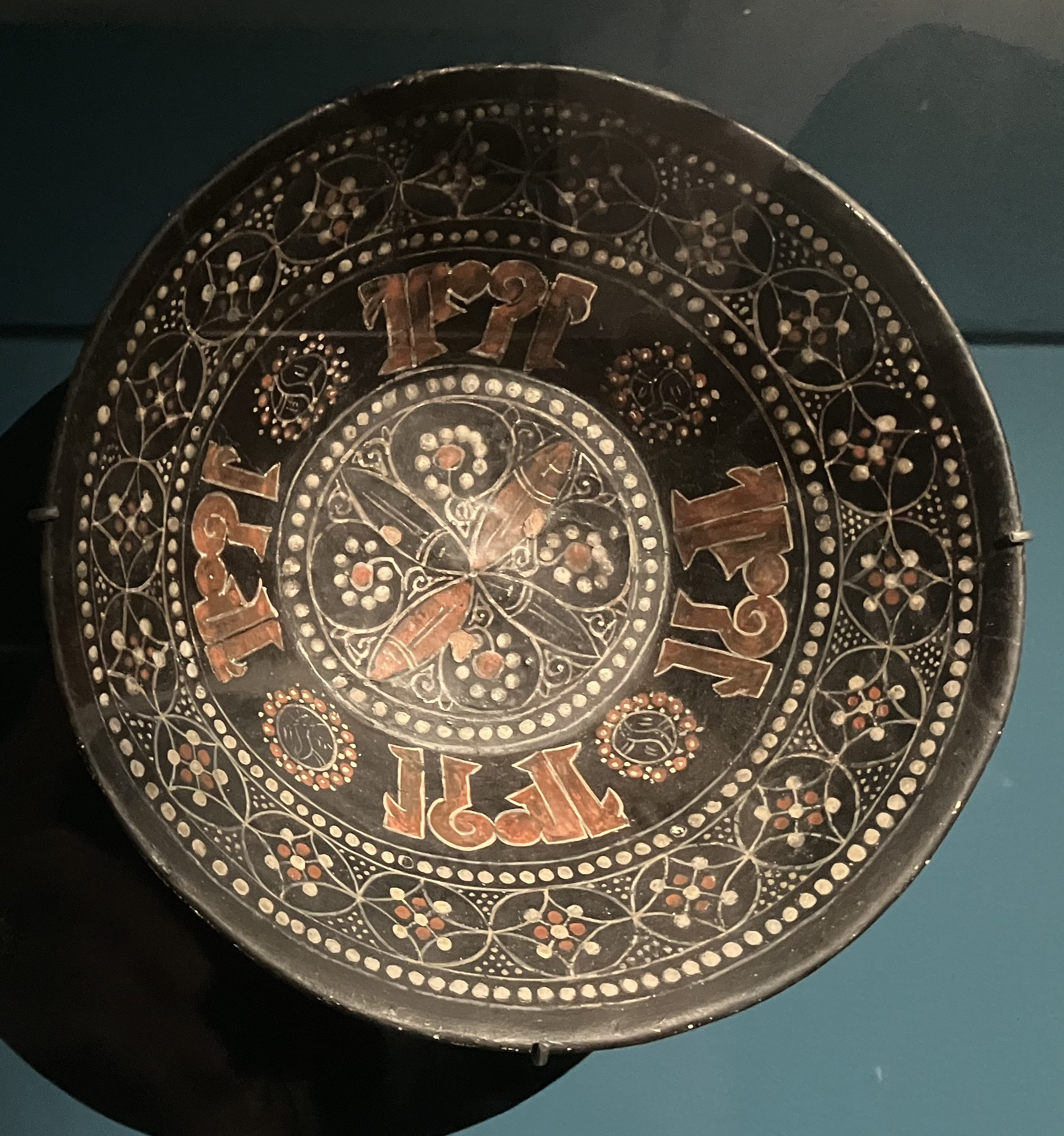
Decorated bowl. Afrasiab (Samarkand), 11th century.

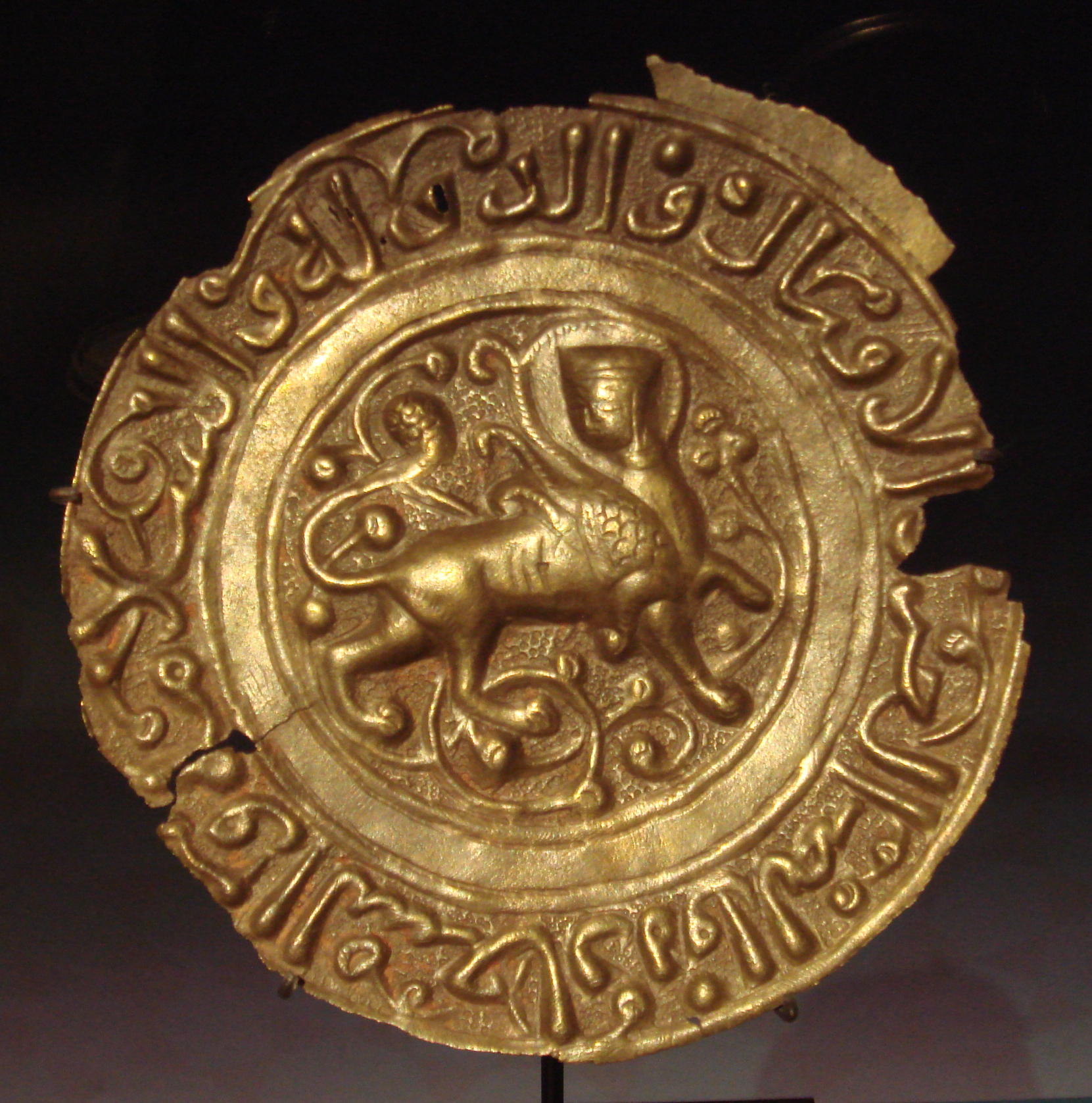
Mirror with figure of a Harpy, 11–12th century, Termez.

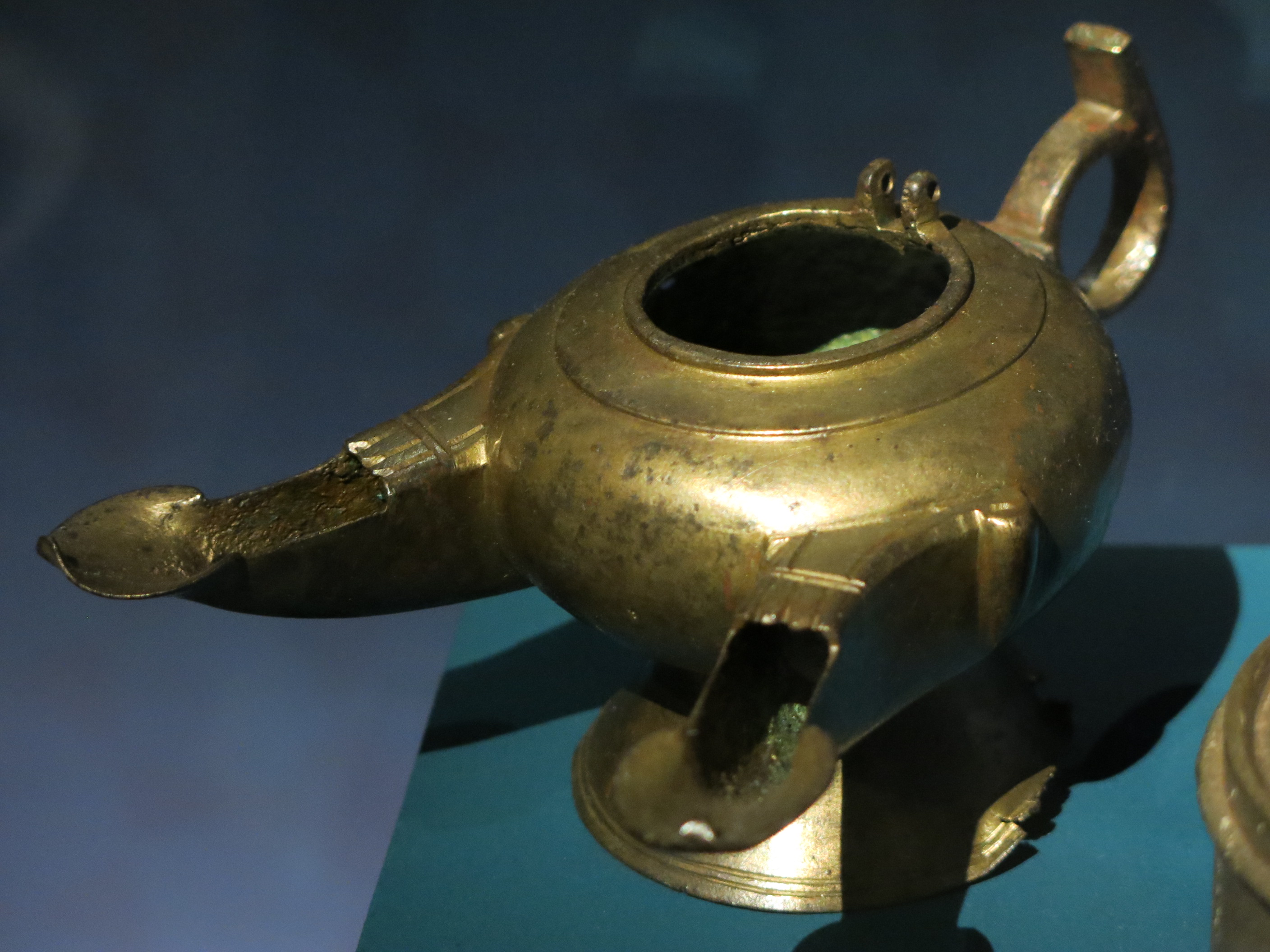
Lamp with double beak, 11–12th century. Paykend.

== Legacy ==
Kara-Khanid is arguably the most enduring cultural heritage among coexisting cultures in Central Asia from the 9th to the 13th centuries. The Karluk-Uyghur dialect spoken by the nomadic tribes and Turkified sedentary populations under Kara-Khanid rule formed two major branches of the Turkic language family, the Chagatay and the Kypchak. The Kara-Khanid cultural model that combined nomadic Turkic culture with Islamic, sedentary institutions spread east into former Kara-Khoja and Tangut territories and west and south into the subcontinent, Khorasan (Turkmenistan, Afghanistan, and Northern Iran), Golden Horde territories (Tataristan), and Turkey. The Chagatay, Timurid, and Uzbek states and societies inherited most of the cultures of the Kara-Khanids and the Khwarezmians without much interruption.

The Kara-Khanids translated the Quran into Middle Turkic. There are four surviving copies of the Quran translations found in various collections and a Middle Turkic excerpt of Al-Fatiha, which supposedly belong to the Kara-Khanid period.

== Identification with China ==
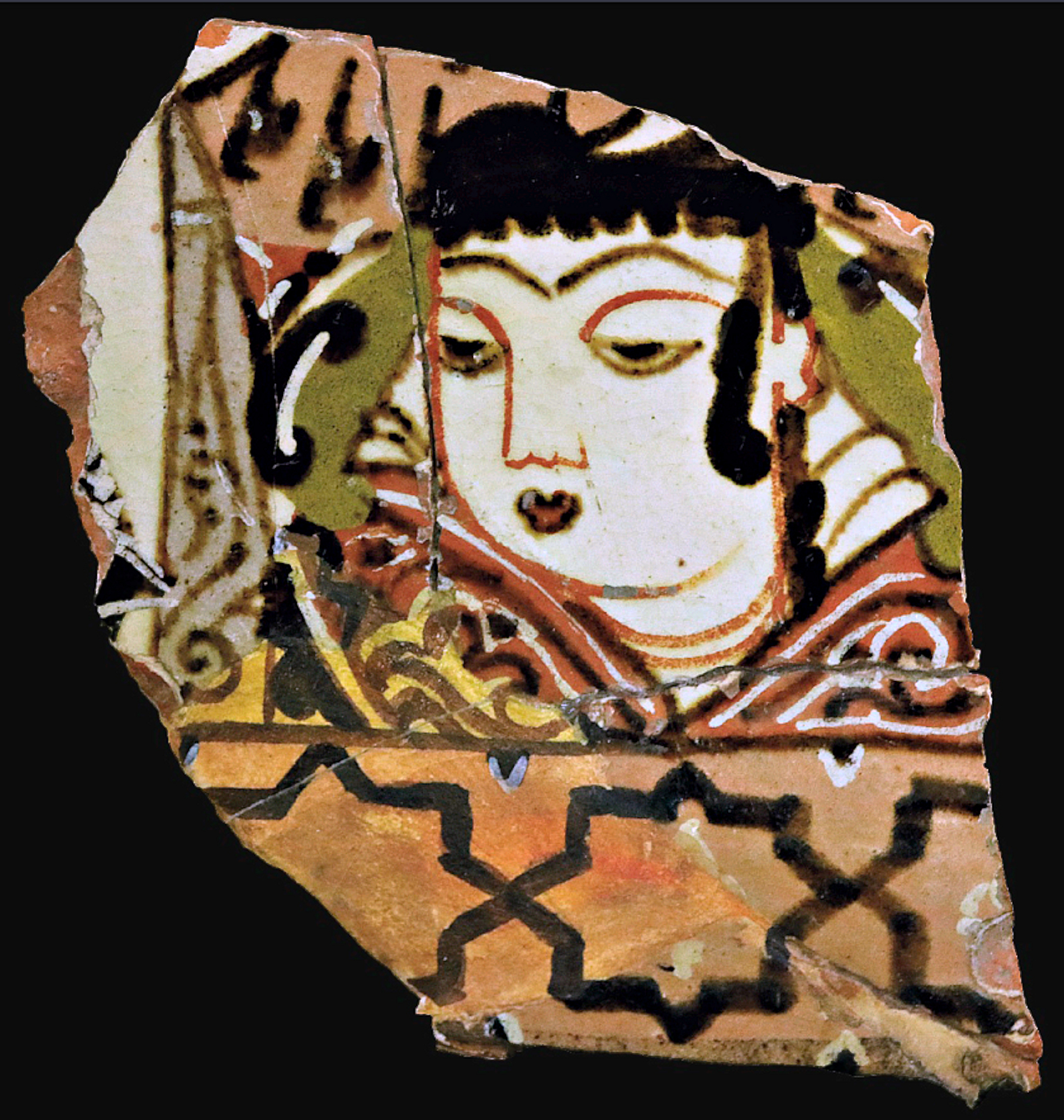
Karakhanid female, Jambyl Region Museum, Kazakhstan.

Kara-Khanid monarchs adopted Tamghaj Khan (Turkic for "Khan of China"; 桃花石汗) or Malik al-Mashriq wa-l'Sin (Arabic for "King of the East and China"; 東方與秦之主) as their title, and minted coins bearing these titles. Another title they used was Sulṭān al-Sharq wa al-Ṣīn (Sultan of the East and China). Early period "proto-Qarakhanid" coinage featured Chinese-style square-holed coins, combined with Arabic writing.

Much of the realm of the Kara-Khanid Khanate, including Transoxiana and the western Tarim Basin, had been under the rule of the Tang dynasty prior to the Battle of Talas in 751, and the Kara-Khanid rulers continued to identify their dynasty with China several centuries later. Yusuf Qadir Khan sent the first Kara-Khanid envoy to the Song dynasty, Boyla Saghun, to request the Song to send an official envoy who would help 'pacify' Khotan, apparently seeking to use the prestige of the Chinese court to strengthen the Kara-Khanids' local status.

The Kara-Khanid rulers also formed marriage relations with the Liao dynasty and addressed the Song emperors as "maternal uncle", in possible imitation of Uyghur and Tibetan rulers who had marital relations with the previous Tang dynasty.

In an account, the Kara-Khanid scholar Mahmud al-Kashgari referred to his homeland, around Kashgar, then part of the Kara-Khanid Khanate, as "Lower China".

== Genetics ==
A genetic study published in Nature in May 2018 examined the remains of three Khara-Khanid individuals. They were found to be carrying the maternal haplogroups G2a2, A and J1c. The Kara-Khanid were found to have more East Asian ancestry than the preceding Goktürks.

== Monarchs ==
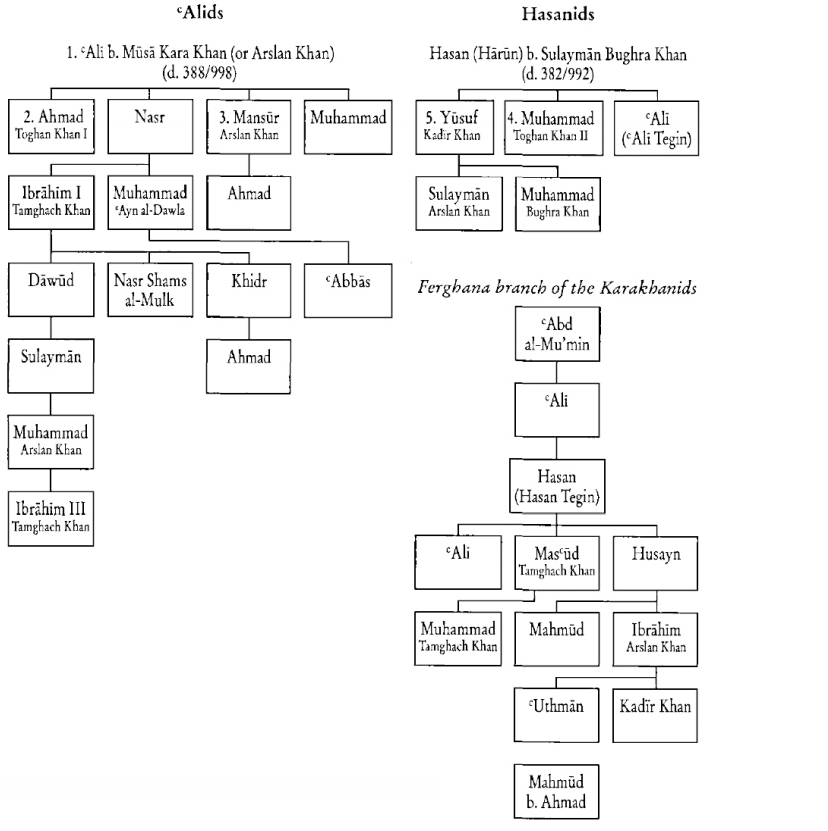
Genealogy of the Karakhanids

- Bilge Kul Qadir Khan (840–893)
- Bazir Arslan Khan (893–920)
- Oghulcak Khan (893–940)
- Satuk Bughra Khan 920–955, in 932-934 adopted Islam, in 942 took power over Karluks
- Musa Bughra Khan 955–971
- Suleyman Arslan Khan 958–970
- Ali Arslan Khan 970–998, Great Qaghan
- Ahmad Arslan Qara Khan 998–1017, son of Ali Arslan
- Mansur Arslan Khan 1017–1024, son of Ali Arslan
- Muhammad Toghan Khan 1024–1026, son of Hasan b. Sulayman
- Yusuf Qadir Khan 1026–1032, son of Hasan b. Sulayman
- Ali Tigin Bughra Khan (1020–1034), Great Qaghan in Samarkand, son of Hasan b. Sulayman
- Abu Shuja' Sulayman 1034–1042

Western Karakhanids

- Tamghach Khan Ibrahim (also known as Böritigin) c. 1040–1068
- Shams al-Mulk Nasr 1068–1080: married Aisha, daughter of Alp Arslan.
- Khidr 1080–1081
- Ahmad 1081–1089
- Ya'qub Qadir Khan 1089–1095
- Mas'ud 1095–1097
- Sulayman Qadir Tamghach 1097
- Mahmud Arslan Khan 1097–1099
- Jibrail Arslan Khan 1099–1102
- Muhammad Arslan Khan 1102–1129
- Nasr 1129
- Ahmad Qadir Khan 1129–1130
- Hasan Jalal ad-Dunya 1130–1132
- Ibrahim Rukn ad-Dunya 1132
- Mahmud 1132–1141
- Ibrahim Tabghach Khan 1141–1156
- Ali Chaghri Khan 1156–1161
- Mas'ud Tabghach Khan 1161–1171
- Muhammad Tabghach Khan 1171–1178
- Ibrahim Arslan Khan 1178–1202
- Uthman ibn Ibrahim 1202–1212

Eastern Karakhanids

- Ebu Shuca Sulayman 1042–1056
- Muhammad bin Yusuph 1056–1057
- İbrahim bin Muhammad Khan 1057–1059
- Mahmud 1059–1075
- Umar (Kara-Khanid) 1075
- Ebu Ali el-Hasan 1075–1102
- Ahmad Khan 1102–1128
- İbrahim bin Ahmad 1128–1158
- Muhammad bin İbrahim 1158–?
- Yusuph bin Muhammad ?–1205
- Ebul Feth Muhammad 1205–1211

== Genealogy of House of Qara-Khan ==
"House of Afrasiab"

Qara-Khanid Khanate
Eastern Qara-Khanid Khanate
Western Qara-Khanid Khanate

Bilge-Kul r. 840–893
Bazir r. 893–920	Oghulchuq r. 920–940
Satuq r. 940–955
Musa r. 955–958	Sulayman I r. 958–970
Ali I r. 993–998	Hasan I r. 970–993
Ahmad I r. 998–1017	Mansur r. 1017–1024	Nasr	Muhammad I r. 1024–1026	Yusuf I r. 1026–1032	Ali II r. 1032–1034
Mahmud I r. 1097–1099	Ibrahim I r. 1040–1068	Sulayman II r. 1034–1042 r. 1042–1055	Muhammad II r. 1055–1057	Mahmud r. 1059–1075	Yusuf
Nasr I r. 1068–1080	Khidr r. 1080–1081	Muhammad	Dawud	Ya'qub r. 1089–1095	Hasan II r. 1075–1102	Ibrahim I r. 1057–1059	Umar r. 1075–1075	Abdul-Mu'min
Ahmad II r. 1081–1089	Mas'ud I r. 1095–1097	Sulayman III r. 1097–1097	Ahmad II r. 1102–1128	Jibril r. 1099–1102	Ali
Muhammad II r. 1102–1129	Ibrahim II r. 1132–1132	Ibrahim II r. 1128–1158	Hasan II r. 1130–1132
Nasr II r. 1129–1129	Ahmad III r. 1129–1130	Mahmud II r. 1132–1141	Ibrahim III r. 1141–1156	Muhammad III r. 1158–1180	Ali III r. 1156–1161	Husayn
Yusuf II r. 1180–1205	Mas'ud II r. 1161–1168	Nasr III r. 1168–1171	Ibrahim IV r. 1178–1202
Muhammad IV r. 1205–1211	Muhammad III r. 1171–1178	Uthman r. 1202–1212

== See also ==
- Khanate
- Göktürks
- Uyghur Khaganate
- Uyghur people
- Karluks
- Chigils
- Yaghmas
- List of Sunni Muslim dynasties
- History of the central steppe
- Islamization and Turkification of Xinjiang

== Sources ==
- Andrade, Tonio (2016), The Gunpowder Age: China, Military Innovation, and the Rise of the West in World History, Princeton University Press, ISBN 978-0-691-13597-7.
- Asimov, M. S. (1998), History of civilizations of Central Asia Volume IV The age of achievement: A.D. 750 to the end of the fifteenth century Part One The historical, social and economic setting, UNESCO Publishing
- Barfield, Thomas (1989), The Perilous Frontier: Nomadic Empires and China, Basil Blackwell
- Barrett, Timothy Hugh (2008), The Woman Who Discovered Printing, Great Britain: Yale University Press, ISBN 978-0-300-12728-7 (alk. paper)
- Beckwith, Christopher I (1987), The Tibetan Empire in Central Asia: A History of the Struggle for Great Power among Tibetans, Turks, Arabs, and Chinese during the Early Middle Ages, Princeton University Press
- Beckwith, Christopher I (2009), Empires of the Silk Road, Princeton University Press
- Biran, Michal (2005), The Empire of the Qara Khitai in Eurasian History: Between China and the Islamic World, Cambridge University Press
- Bregel, Yuri (2003), An Historical Atlas of Central Asia, Brill
- Davidovich, E. A. (1998), "The Karakhanids", in Asimov, M.S.; Bosworth, C.E. (eds.), History of Civilisations of Central Asia (PDF), vol. 4 part I, UNESCO Publishing, p. 120, ISBN 92-3-103467-7
- Damgaard, P. B.; et al. (May 9, 2018). "137 ancient human genomes from across the Eurasian steppes". Nature. 557 (7705). Nature Research: 369–373. Bibcode:2018Natur.557..369D. doi:10.1038/s41586-018-0094-2. hdl:1887/3202709. PMID 29743675. S2CID 13670282.
- Drompp, Michael Robert (2005), Tang China And The Collapse Of The Uighur Empire: A Documentary History, Brill
- Ebrey, Patricia Buckley (1999), The Cambridge Illustrated History of China, Cambridge: Cambridge University Press, ISBN 0-521-66991-X (paperback).
- Ebrey, Patricia Buckley; Walthall, Anne; Palais, James B. (2006), East Asia: A Cultural, Social, and Political History, Boston: Houghton Mifflin, ISBN 0-618-13384-4
- Golden, Peter. B. (1990), "The Karakhanids and Early Islam", in Sinor, Denis (ed.), The Cambridge History of Early Inner Asia, Cambridge University Press, ISBN 0-521-2-4304-1
- Golden, Peter B. (1992), An Introduction to the History of the Turkic Peoples: Ethnogenesis and State-Formation in Medieval and Early Modern Eurasia and the Middle East, OTTO HARRASSOWITZ · WIESBADEN
- Golden, Peter B. (2011), Central Asia in World History, Oxford University Press
- Grousset, Rene (2004), The Empire of the Steppes, Rutgers University Press
- Hansen, Valerie (2012), The Silk Road: A New History, Oxford University Press
- Haywood, John (1998), Historical Atlas of the Medieval World, AD 600-1492, Barnes & Noble
- Latourette, Kenneth Scott (1964), The Chinese, their history and culture, Volumes 1-2, Macmillan
- Kochnev, Boris D. (1996) “The Origins of the Karakhanids. A Reconsideration”, Der Islam, 73: 352–7.
- Lorge, Peter A. (2008), The Asian Military Revolution: from Gunpowder to the Bomb, Cambridge University Press, ISBN 978-0-521-60954-8
- Millward, James (2009), Eurasian Crossroads: A History of Xinjiang, Columbia University Press
- Moriyasu, Takao (2004), Die Geschichte des uigurischen Manichäismus an der Seidenstrasse: Forschungen zu manichäischen Quellen und ihrem geschichtlichen Hintergrund, Otto Harrassowitz Verlag
- Needham, Joseph (1986), Science & Civilisation in China, vol. V:7: The Gunpowder Epic, Cambridge University Press, ISBN 0-521-30358-3
- Pozzi, Alessandra; Janhunen, Juha Antero; Weiers, Michael, eds. (2006). Tumen Jalafun Jecen Aku: Manchu Studies in Honour of Giovanni Stary. Otto Harrassowitz Verlag. ISBN 978-3-447-05378-5.
- Rong, Xinjiang (2013), Eighteen Lectures on Dunhuang, Brill
- Shaban, M. A. (1979), The ʿAbbāsid Revolution, Cambridge: Cambridge University Press, ISBN 0-521-29534-3
- Sima, Guang (2015), Bóyángbǎn Zīzhìtōngjiàn 54 huánghòu shīzōng 柏楊版資治通鑑54皇后失蹤, Yuǎnliú chūbǎnshìyè gǔfèn yǒuxiàn gōngsī, ISBN 978-957-32-0876-1
- Skaff, Jonathan Karam (2012), Sui-Tang China and Its Turko-Mongol Neighbors: Culture, Power, and Connections, 580-800 (Oxford Studies in Early Empires), Oxford University Press
- Soucek, Svatopluk (2000), A history of Inner Asia, Cambridge University Press
- Starr, S. (2015), Xinjiang: China's Muslim Borderland, Routledge
- Tetley, G.E. (2009), Ghaznavid and Seljuk Turks: Poetry as a Source for Iranian History, Routledge
- Thum, Rian (2012), Modular History: Identity Maintenance before Uyghur Nationalism, The Association for Asian Studies, Inc.
- Wang, Zhenping (2013), Tang China in Multi-Polar Asia: A History of Diplomacy and War, University of Hawaii Press
- Fedorov M. N. Karakhanidskaya numizmatika kak istochnik po istorii Sredney Azii kontsa X — nachala XIII vv. Avtoreferat doktorskoy dissertatsii. Novosibirsk. 1990
- Wilkinson, Endymion (2015). Chinese History: A New Manual, 4th edition. Cambridge, MA: Harvard University Asia Center distributed by Harvard University Press. ISBN 9780674088467.
- Yuan, Shu (2001), Bóyángbǎn Tōngjiàn jìshìběnmò 28 dìèrcìhuànguánshídài 柏楊版通鑑記事本末28第二次宦官時代, Yuǎnliú chūbǎnshìyè gǔfèn yǒuxiàn gōngsī, ISBN 957-32-4273-7
- Xiong, Victor Cunrui (2000), Sui-Tang Chang'an: A Study in the Urban History of Late Medieval China (Michigan Monographs in Chinese Studies), U OF M CENTER FOR CHINESE STUDIES, ISBN 0892641371
- Xiong, Victor Cunrui (2009), Historical Dictionary of Medieval China, United States of America: Scarecrow Press, Inc., ISBN 978-0810860537
- Xue, Zongzheng (1992), Turkic peoples, 中国社会科学出版社
