= Musa Baytash Khan =

Khagan of Karakhanids
- Reign: 955–971
- Predecessor: Sultan Satuq Bughra Khan
- Successor: Süleyman Arslan Khan
- Died: 970-972 CE
- House: Karakhanid dynasty
- Father: Sultan Satuq Bughra Khan
- Religion: Islam

Musa Baytash Khan (Uyghur: مۇسا بايتاش خان; died 971) was a Turkic ruler and the fifth Great Khagan of the Karakhanid state and the second Muslim Khan to rule. His name is often mentioned as Tonga Illig, Arslan Khan (in Tazkirah Bughra Khan). His brother Sulayman Arslan was the Bughra-Khan with western parts of the country assigned as his appanage during Baytash's rule.

== Reign ==
His reign saw raids against Qocho and Khotan. He developed water conservancy and transportation near Kashgar and founded a school, a mosque and a library. Ibn ul-Athir reported that, in 960, during his reign, 200,000 Turkic people embraced Islam. Samanid proselytizers Abul Hasan Said b. Hatim and Abuzar Ammar at-Tamimi were instrumental in this regard. Musa Baytash temporarily lost Kashgar to the King of Khotan, Visa Sura (尉迟输罗) when the latter attacked the Karakhanid state in 971, achieving a big victory. In addition to women and children, there were elephants among the spoils, which were sent to Song China as tribute. It is unknown when his reign came to an end.

He left only one son, Ali Arslan Khan. His daughter Büwi Maryam's tomb, located in Beshkerem (伯什克热木乡), Kashgar, is a holy site for Muslims.
