= Alp Er Tunga =

Legendary Turkic Khan

Alp Er Tunga or Alp Er Tonga (Alp "brave, hero, conqueror, warrior", Er "man, male, soldier, Tom", Tonga/Tunga "Siberian tiger") is a mythical Turkic hero who was mentioned in Mahmud al-Kashgari's Dīwān Lughāt al-Turk, Yusuf Balasaguni's Kutadgu Bilig and in the Vatican manuscript of Oghuznama by an unknown writer.

The Karakhanids claimed to have descended from Alp Er Tunga.

== Alp Er Tunga Epic ==
Original Middle Turkic with Turkish transliteration	Translation
Alp Er Tunga öldi mü?	Did Alper Tunga die?
İsiz ajun kaldı mu?	Did poor (world) remained unheaded?
Ödlek öçin aldı mu?	Did the fate (time) took its revenge?
Emdi yürek yırtılur.	Now the heart is breaking.
Ödlek yırag közetti,	The fate defended him, his weapon,
Ogrı tuzak uzattı,	Added strength to his strength,
Begler begin azıttı,	Made the bey of beys go astray
Kaçan kalı kurtulur.	How he could find rescue had he stayed there,
Ulşıp eren börleyü,	The brave men would howl like a wolf,
Yırtıp yaka urlayu,	Tear their collars and cry loudly,
Sıkrıp üni yurlayu,	Scream and shout,
Sıgtap közi örtülür.	Shed tears and the tears will dim their eyes.
