= Ilig Khan Nasr =

Kara-Khanid ruler of Kashgar (d. 1012)

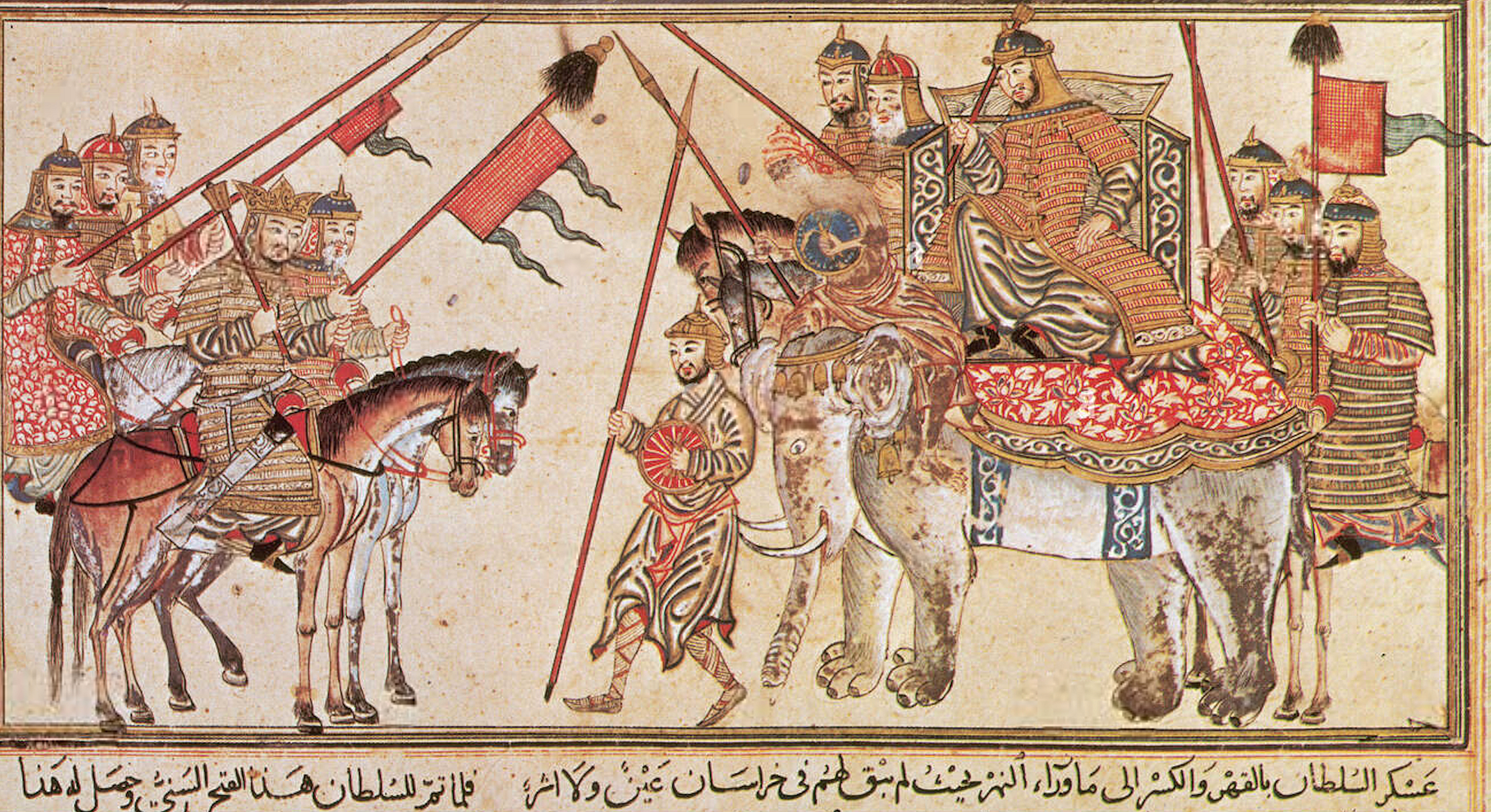
The Kara-Khanid Ilig Khan Nasr (left) facing Mahmud of Ghazni riding an elephant in 1017–1018. Jami al-Tawarikh, 1306-14 (Edinburgh Or Ms 20)

Abu'l Husain Nasr commonly known by his title Ilig Khan, also Ilig Khan Nasr (died 1012), was a ruler of the Kara-Khanids. He was a son of Ali Arslan Khan.

Ilig Khan conquered Bukhara from the Samanids in 999, bringing an end to that rival dynasty. He then reached an agreement with Mahmud of Ghazni, in which they agreed to partition former Samanid territory along the Oxus river. With this agreement, the north-eastern lands of Islam came under the power of two Turkish Empires, the Kara-Khanids and the Ghaznavids, paving the way for Turkish immigration from Inner Central Asia. He died in 1012-1013 and was succeeded by his brother Ahmad Tughan Khan.

== Bibliography ==
- Haig, W. (1928). The Cambridge History of India: Turks and Afghans, edited by W. Haig. Vol. III. University Press.
