= Battle of Dabusiyya =

Battle in 1032

The Battle of Dabusiyya was fought between the Ghaznavid Empire and the Kara-Khanid Khanate in April 1032 near Dabusiyya, a small town between Bukhara and Samarkand. The result was a bloody stalemate which left the commander of the Ghaznavid forces, Altun Tash, mortally wounded.
