= Ülüş system =

Historical administrative system for Turkic and Mongolic states

The Ülüş system was the administrative system of the historical Turkic and Mongolic states. The noun Üleş in Turkish means "share" and the verb "üleş-mek" means to share.

== The system ==
According to historian Halil İnalcık, the sovereignty didn't belong solely to the khagan (emperor), but to the members of the khagan's family. Thus the khagan allocated each member of the family a share of the country. This share was called ülüş. According to Kürşat Kocak however, the ülüş practice included also high level state officials. This resembles the fief system in Medieval Europe. It is stressed by Lev Gumilev that it was not a European type feudalism, but the system was developed by the Southern Xiongnu during the second century AD. It was used by the First Turkic Khaganate, Uyghur Khaganate, Mongol Empire and other political powers of Central Asia.

== Example ==
In the First Turkic Khaganate (551–581) during the reign of Taspar Qaghan in 576, there were 8 üleşes (see Göktürk family tree).

1. Taspar: in the Altai Mountain area
2. She tu (Taspar’s nephew; later renamed Ishbara as the khagan): east part of the khaganette
3. Böri (Taspar's nephew): west part of the Eastern territory
4. Töremen (Taspar's nephew, later renamed Apa as the khagan): north territories
5. Kara Çürün (Taspar's cousin later renamed Tardu as the khagan of the Western Territory): in Yedisu area
6. Tamgan (Taspar's cousin): in Volga River area
7. Amrak (Taspar's son): (unidentified)
8. Tegin shad (Taspar’s son): unidentified
