= Ilaq =

Medieval region in Transoxiana

Map of Ilaq and surrounding regions in the tenth century

Ilaq (Arabic: إيلاق) was a medieval region in Transoxiana which was located in modern northeastern Uzbekistan, to the east of the Syr Darya and south of Tashkent. The capital of the district was Tunkath.

== Geography ==
In the medieval period, Ilaq lay along the valley of the Angren River, to the north of the large bend of the Syr Darya near Khujand. The district, which was composed of a mixed terrain of plains and mountains, was bounded on the west by the Syr Darya and on the north by the region of Shash (modern Tashkent), and it extended to the western edge of the Tian Shan in the east. Due to the proximity of Shash and Ilaq, the two districts were sometimes linked by Muslim geographers, who either treated them as one united area or characterized Ilaq as a dependency of Shash. As a combined unit, Shash-Ilaq constituted one of the five primary sedentary regions of pre-modern Central Asia, along with Sughd, Khwarazm, Farghana, and the area of Balkh.

Ilaq was known to feature a large number of settlements, with al-Istakhri listing fourteen towns that belonged to it. The largest town of the district, at half the size of Binkath in Shash, was Tunkath, which also served as the residence of a local dihqan. Relatively little is known about the other towns of Ilaq, with both their specific locations and the spelling of their names remaining uncertain.

== History ==
Ilaq is known to have existed prior to the Muslim conquest of Transoxiana, with archeological and numismatic evidence demonstrating that it was extant as far back as the sixth or seventh centuries. Bronze coins dating to this period contain Soghdian inscriptions which include the name Tunakand, an earlier form of Tunkath, and depict the image of a local ruler. Modern excavation projects have also revealed the site of a possible fire temple in Tunkath, suggesting that fire worship was practiced by the inhabitants of the region during the pre-Islamic era.

Ilaq presumably fell into Islamic hands during the conquest of Transoxiana in the eighth century, but no mention of it is made in accounts of the Muslim campaigns, possibly indicating that it was considered a part of Shash at the time. In the decades following the conquest it remained a border district, as it lay along the frontier separating the lands of Islam from those of the pagan Turks.

More is known about Ilaq in the ninth and tenth centuries, as relatively extensive information was provided about the region by geographers of that era. It was described as a large and prosperous province situated between the mountains and the steppe, with numerous towns and districts. A large number of mines were in operation in the region, which produced a significant quantity of silver, gold, and other minerals, and local coins were minted bearing the names Ilaq or Tunkath. The chief of the province, known as the dihqan-i Ilaq, resided in Tunkath and was considered to be a powerful individual. Religiously, the dihqan was known to be sympathetic to Isma'ili doctrines propagated by Muhammad ibn Ahmad al-Nasafi during the reign of the Samanid ruler Nasr ibn Ahmad (r. 914–943), while the people of the district largely adhered to the creed of those "in white raiment," presumably in reference to the eighth century rebel al-Muqanna'.

With the ascension of the Samanids in Transoxiana in the ninth century, Ilaq became subject to the amirs in Bukhara, and remained so until the last years of Samanid rule. In 992, in the same year as a major Qarakhanid raid into Transoxiana, the Ilaq mint began producing coins bearing the name of the Qarakhanid leader Harun or Hasan Bughra Khan, and the region became subject to the Turks, although the dihqans continued to hold power in Tunkath. Coins featuring the names Ilaq or Tunkath continued to be produced until the mid-eleventh century; after that, however, no further numismatic evidence exists, and the district likely became a part of Shash around this time.
