= Ali Arslan Khan =

Karakhanid ruler

Khagan of Karakhanids
- Reign: 971–998
- Predecessor: Suleyman Arslan Khan
- Successor: Ahmad Toghan Khan
- Died: 998
- Burial: Ordam Padishah, Yengisar 38.9144°N 76.6567°E
- House: Karakhanid dynasty
- Father: Musa Baytash Khan
- Religion: Islam

Ali Arslan Khan, Ali ibn Musa ( Uyghur: ئەلى ئارسلان خان; died 998) was the seventh ruler of the Karakhanids. He was the founder of the Alid line of the Karakhanids.

Almost nothing is known about his reign except his unsuccessful raid into the Kingdom of Khotan in 998. His tomb is located in Ordam Padishah, Yengishahar and was an important mazar shrine and pilgrim site. In September 2020, a report by the Australian Strategic Policy Institute on Chinese oppression against the Uyghurs' religious practices stated that the site had been completely destroyed by 2019. Since at least 2000, authorities had prevented mass pilgrimage to the site.
