= List of Uyghurs =

This is a list of notable members of the Uyghur ethnic group, primarily affiliated with the general region of Central and East Asia.

== Famous kings and historical figures ==
=== Uyghur Khaganate and Qocho Kingdom ===
- Kutlug Bilge Qaghan (?–747), the first leader of the Uyghur Khaganate, the successor state to the Second Turkic Khaganate
- Bayanchur Qaghan (713–759), the second leader of the Uyghur Khaganate
- Bogu Qaghan (?–780), the third leader of the Uyghur Khaganate
- Tun Baga Tarkhan (born c. 737–742; died 789), the fourth leader of the Uyghur Khaganate
- Kulug Bilge Qaghan (born c. 772–773; died 790), the fifth leader of the Uyghur Khaganate
- Qutluq Bilge Qaghan
- Qutluq II Bilge Qaghan
- Bayanchur Qaghan
- Bogu Qaghan
- Baurchuk Art Tekin
- Baoyi Qaghan
- Chongde Qaghan
- Zhangxin Qaghan
- Enian Qaghan
- Uge Qaghan
- Qasar Qaghan
- Zhaoli Qaghan

=== Kara-khanids ===
- Oghulchak Khan
- Bazir Arslan Khan
- Musa Baytash Khan
- Ali Arslankhan
- Ali Tegin
- Böritigin
- Sultan Satuq Bughra Khan
- Bilge Kul Qadir Khan (840–893)
- Musa Bughra Khan (955–958)
- Suleyman Arslan Khan (958–970)
- Ahmad Arslan Qara Khan (998–1017), the son of Ali Arslan
- Mansur Arslan Khan (1017–1024), the son of Ali Arslan
- Muhammad Toghan Khan (1024–1026), the son of Hasan b. Sulayman
- Yusuf Qadir Khan (1026–1032), the son of Hasan b. Sulayman
- Ebu Shuca Sulayman (1034–1042)
- Böritigin (1040–1068)
- Nasr Shams al-Mulk (1068–1080), married Aisha, the daughter of Alp Arslan
- Khidr (1080–1081)
- Ahmad (1081–1089)
- Ya'qub Qadir Khan (1089–1095)
- Mas'ud (1095–1097)
- Sulayman Qadir Tamghach (1097)
- Mahmud Arslan Khan (1097–1099)
- Jibrail Arslan Khan (1099–1102)
- Muhammad Arslan Khan (1102–1129)
- Nasr (1129)
- Ahmad Qadir Khan 1129–1130
- Hasan Jalal ad-Dunya 1130–1132
- Ibrahim Rukn ad-Dunya 1132
- Mahmud 1132–1141
- Ibrahim Tabghach Khan 1141–1156
- Ali Chaghri Khan 1156–1161
- Mas'ud Tabghach Khan 1161–1171
- Muhammad Tabghach Khan 1171–1178
- Ibrahim Arslan Khan 1178–1204
- Uthman Ulugh Sultan 1204–1212
- Ebu Shuca Sulayman 1042–1056
- Muhammad bin Yusuph 1056–10579
- İbrahim bin Muhammad Khan 1057–1059
- Mahmud 1059–1075
- Umar (Kara-Khanid) 1075
- Ebu Ali el-Hasan 1075–1102
- Ahmad Khan 1102–1128
- İbrahim bin Ahmad 1128–1158
- Muhammad bin İbrahim (1158–?)
- Yusuph bin Muhammad (?–1205)
- Ebul Feth Muhammad 1205–1211

=== Moghulistan ===
- Akhmad Alach, the Khan of Eastern Moghulistan (Uyghurstan) from 1487 and the Kyrgyz Khanate from 1484 until 1504
- Makhmud Khan, the Khan of Tashkent from 1487 until c. 1502 or 1503 and of the Moghuls of western Moghulistan from 1487 until 1508
- Tughlugh Timur, the Khan of Moghulistan from c. 1347 and the Chagatai Khanate from c. 1360 until 1363
- lyas Khoja
- Qamar-ud-din Khan Dughlat
- Khizr Khoja
- Shams-i-Jahan
- Muhammad Khan (?–1415), the Khan of Moghulistan from 1408 until 1415
- Naqsh-i-Jahan
- Awais Khan
- Sher Muhammad
- Awais Khan
- Satuq Khan
- Esen Buqa II
- Mansur Khan (born c. 1482–1483; died 1543), the last Khan of a united Moghulistan from 1503 until 1543
- Sultan Said Khan
- Yunus Khan (born c. 1462; died 1487), the Khan of Moghulistan from 1462 until 1487
- Dost Muhammad
- Appaq Khoja
- Kebek Sultan

=== Yarkend Khanate ===
- Abdurashid Khan (1508–1560), the ruler of the Yarkent Khanate from 1533 until 1560
- Abdul Karim Khan (1529–1591), the ruler of the Yarkent Khanate from 1560 until 1591
- Muhammad Sultan (1538–1610), the 5th son of Abdurashid Khan and the ruler of the Yarkent Khanate from 1592 until 1609. In 1603, he was visited by Portuguese Jesuit Bento de Góis, who was searching land route from India to Ming China. He headed a trade mission on behalf of Mughal emperor Akbar and was granted a letter of safe passage.
- Shudja ad Din Ahmad Khan (1570–1680), the son of Muhammad Sultan and the Khan of the Yarkent Khanate from 1609 until 1618
- Kuraysh Sultan, the son of Yunus Khan and the ruler of the Yarkent Khanate for 9 days before his killing in 1618
- Abd al-Latif (Afak) Khan (born c. 1605; died 1630), the ruler of the Yarkent Khanate from 1618 until 1630 and the second son of Shudja ad-Din Ahmad Khan
- Sultan Ahmad Khan (Pulat Khan) (?–1615), the first son of Timur Sultan
- Mahmud Sultan (Qilich Khan) (born c. 1614; died 1636), the second son of Timur Sultan and the founder of Ishakiyya branch of Nakshbandi Khojagan Sufi Order. He died in the age of 22 when he was poisoned by Khoja Yahiya.
- Sultan Ahmad Khan (Pulat Khan) (born c. 1613; died 1640), the ruler of the Yarkent Khanate from 1636 until 1638. He restored the khanship with help of Kara Taghlik leader Khoja Yahiya. He resigned in 1638 on demands of Kashgar and Yarkand emirs in favor of Abdullah Khan.
- Abdullah Khan (in Turfan 1634/5–1638/9) 1638–1669, the eldest son of Abduraim Khan, grandson of Abdurashid Khan. During his reign Baghistan in Ili River Valley of former Moghulistan ( with tomb of Tughluk Timur Khan, founder of Moghul Dynasty in 1347, in Almalik near Ghulja) was lost to Dzungar Khan Erdeni Batur (1634–1653) in 1651, who created Dzungar Khanate in 1634 under Choros nobility, after former Confederation of 4 Kalmyk tribes ( Khoit, Khoshut, Choros and Torghut ) collapsed in Dzungaria in 1628. Abdullah Khan was expelled by Kashgar and Yarkand Beks to India in 1669, where he was received by Moghul Emperor Aurangzeb, who arranged his Hajj to Mecca and provided all supplies, died on October 30, 1675, in India in the age of 67, buried in Agra.
- Nur ad-Din Sultan ( in Aksu 1649–1667) 1667–1668 in Kashgar and Yengisar, the youngest son of Abdullah Khan, died in 1668 in the age of 31 due to heavy drinking, reigned one year with help of the Kara Yanchuks, mercenaries from Dzungars and Kyrgyz tribes, who were first recruited on service in Yarkand Khanate during last years of reigning of Abdullah Khan.
- Ismail Khan (in Chalish 1666–1669, in Aksu 1669–1670) 1669, the 5th son of Abduraim Khan, grandson of Abdurashid Khan, disciple of Kara Taghlik leader Khoja Ubaidullah (Khoja Shadi), son of Khoja Yahiya, was declared a Khan in Aksu after Abdullah Khan fled to India.
- YuIbars Khan ( In Kashgar 1638–1667, since age of 8) 1669–1670, the eldest son of Abdullah Khan, disciple of Ak Taghlik leader Khoja Mohammad Yusuf (son of Khoja Kalon who died in 1598 and was founder of Ishkiya branch of Nakshbandi Khojagan Sufi Order, followers of which were known as Aktaghliks) and his son Appak Khoja, during his reign positions of Ak Taghliks in Yarkand Khanate greatly increased, was killed in 1670 by Dzungar supporter Erka Bek, main controller of Dzungar Khan Sengge (1653–1671) in Yarkand, in the age of 40.
- Abd al Latif Sultan 1670, son of Yulbars Khan, who was set up on khanship by Ak Taghliks, was killed in the same 1670 by Kara Taghliks with all other sons of Yulbars Khan.
- Ismail Khan 1670–1678, restored on April 2, 1670, by Kara Taghliks, expelled Appak Khoja and his son Yahia Khoja from the country in 1670, in 1678 was captured by Dzungars in Yarkand ( they were invited into the country by Ak Taghlik leader Appak Khoja who used for this recommendation letter from 5th Dalai Lama with whom he met in exile), died in Ili River Valley ( Baghistan) in 1680 in the age of 56.
- Abd ar-Rashid Khan II 1678–1682, the eldest son of Sultan Said Baba Khan, set up on khanship by Dzungar Galdan (1671–1697), who came to Yarkand with Appak Khoja and was rewarded by him with 4,000 pcs of fine clothes and 100,000 silver coins (tangas) for military help. In 1682, Abd ar-Rashid Khan II was sent to Ili under escort by Dzungars, who reacted on complaint of Appak.Khoja to Galdan against Abd ar-Rashid Khan II and again were generously rewarded by him. Abd ar-Rashid Khan II fled to Beijing with his son Sultan and surrendered to the Kangxi Emperor in 1696 after Galdan's collapse.
- Muhammad Imin Khan 1682–1692 (1680–1682 in Chalish, 1682 in Turfan), second son of Sultan Said Baba Khan. After his oldest brother Abd ar-Rashid Khan II was expelled, Muhammad Imin Khan was recalled from Turpan and elected a Khan on a Kurultai of Kashgar and Yarkand Begs. Organized several expeditions against Dzungars. It caused no objections from Appak Khoja, who even married Muhammad Imin Khan's sister Khanum Padshah to save his already shaken prestige and influence among population. In 1692 Muhammad Imin Khan issued State Order (Yarlik ) about expelling Appak Khoja and his son Yahiya Khoja from Yarkent Khanate. In response, Appak Khoja swore to exterminate all descendants of Chengiz Khan in the country and collected troops of his disciples. In decisive battle near Kargilik in 1692 most Muhammad Imin Khan's troops deserted him and joined Khojas. Muhammad Amin Khan fled to the mountains where he was killed.
- Yahiya Khoja (in Kashgar 1690–1692) 1692–1695, son of Appak Khoja, set up on khanship by Appak Khoja, killed in 1695 by Hanim Padsha.
- Hanim Padsha (Khanum Padshah) 1695, sister of Muhammad Imin Khan, widow of Appak Khoja, was killed in 1695.
- Muhammad Mumin Khan (Akbash Khan) 1695–1705, the youngest son of Sultan Said Baba Khan, great-grandson of Abdurashid Khan, disciple of Kara Taghliks, recalled Kara Taghlik leader Khoja Daniyal (died in 1735) from exile in Kashmir to resist Ak Taghliks and Dzungars, fled to India in 1705 under protection of Aurangzeb of Moghul Empire.
- Shah Khan 1543–1570, the eldest son of Mansur Khan
- Koraish Sultan (Khotan 1533–1570; Chalish 1570–88) 1570–1588, son of Abdurashid Khan, expelled to India in 1588 by Abdul Karim Khan, where he was received by Moghul Emperor Akbar the Great, who gave him one of regions of India in suyurgal (inheritable possession of land with all peasants on it).
- Muhammad Khan (in Kashgaria 1591–1610), 1588–1591, son of Abdurashid Khan
- Abduraim Khan 1591–1594, 1605–1634, the youngest son of Abdurashid Khan, died in 1634 in the age of 77. Had 9 sons, eldest of them was Abdullah Khan.
- Khudabende Sultan 1594–1605, son of Koraish Sultan, died in 1605
- Muhammad Khashim Sultan (in Chalish) 1608–1610, son of Khudabende Sultan, grandson of Koraish Sultan, was killed in 1610 by Abduraim Khan in Kucha.
- Abdullah Khan (in Chalish, in Kashgaria 1638–1669) 1634–1638, the eldest son of Abduraim Khan.
- Abu'l Muhammad Khan 1638–1653, son of Abduraim Khan. In 1646 sent an embassy to Beijing to congratulate the newly proclaimed Manchu Shunzhi Emperor as first Emperor of the Qing dynasty of China, that succeeded the Ming dynasty, which was overthrown by Manchus in 1644. Embassy brought dozens of horses, camels and precision jade stones as a gift to the emperor. In accordance with ancient Chinese tradition it was declared as a Tribute from Vassal of China. In 1646 Turpan was granted by Qing China the rights to trade in the capital Beijing and in the city of Lanzhou, capital of Gansu province.
- Sultan Said Baba Khan ( in Kumul 1636–1653) 1653, died in 1680 in the age of 53, 4th son of Abduraim Khan
- Ibrahim Sultan ( in Khotan 1638–1653) 1653–1655, son of Abduraim Khan, was killed in 1655
- Sultan Said Baba Khan (restored) 1655–1680. In 1656 sent an embassy to Qing China with gifts for the Shunzhi Emperor, who accepted them and issued an imperial order on October 19, 1656, concerning trade regulations with Turpan, and sent back with mission 338 pieces of silk garment and 723 rolls of fine silk as a gift to Turpan ruler.
- Abd ar-Rashid Khan II (in Chalish 1678–1680) 1680–1682, the eldest son of Sultan Said Baba Khan, was captured in 1682 by Dzungars and held in captivity for 14 years, was rescued in 1696 by the Kangxi Emperor's Qing troops, who launched military operations against Dzungar Galdan Boshugtu Khan in Khalkha region and defeated him here in June 1696. Abdurashid Khan II was interrogated by Qings and gave them clues about Dzungar Khan's capture, explaining that he could to flee to Kukunor only through Turpan and Kumul, which supplied his troops with food. Qings contacted ruler of Kumul Ubaidullah Khan (?–1709), he captured son of Galdan Boshugtu Khan Tsewang Baljir, who came to Kumul for food, and handed over to Qings. Galdan Boshugtu Khan died of illness in 1697, his dead body was captured by Ubaidullah Khan as well and handed over to Qings. The Kangxi Emperor rewarded Abdurashid Khan II and Ubaidullah Khan for active participating in the operation for liquidating of Galdan Boshugtu Khan, Abdurashid Khan II was given permit to return to his homeland, while his son Sultan was retained in Beijing as actual hostage. Ubaidullah Khan was given the title of Jasak prince with his existing title of Tarkhan being confirmed (exemption from taxation and punishment until committing of 10th crime), the seal, imperial silk clothes and silver money, that was declared by Qings as incorporating of Kumul Khanate into Qing China. Son of Ubaidullah Khan Gapur Bek was appointed as assistant of Commander-in-chief of Qing troops in Suzhou, Gansu province, with permanent residence in this city that actually meant taking him as a hostage by Qings.
- Muhammad Imin Khan 1682–1690, second son of Sultan Said Baba Khan, great-grandson of Abdurashid Khan. In 1682 sent an embassy to Qing China with gifts for the Kangxi Emperor. In his letter to the Kangxi Emperor, Muhammad Imin Khan apologized for delay of Tribute from Turpan, that was caused by recent turmoil in the country. The Kangxi Emperor accepted gifts and gave recommendation to replace horses for Jade in Tribute ( with compensation of 300 rolls of fine silk for 100 Tael (about 3.78 kg) of Jade). Embassy from Turpan was accompanied by Envoy from Kashgar Islam Khoja who informed the Kangxi Emperor of recent Dzungar invasion and asked some help against Galdan Boshugtu Khan, but result of negotiations is unknown

=== Kumul Khanate ===
- Yulbars Khan
- Maqsud Shah

=== Yettishar ===
- Yaqub Beg

=== Iliy Khanate ===
- Alahan Sultan
- Sadyr Palwan
- Gheni Batur

=== Other figures ===
- Eretna, was the first sultan of the Eretnids
- Hala Bashi, Ming dynasty general during the 1370s Miao Rebellions
- Iparhan, is a figure in Chinese legend
- Rabban Bar Sauma, was a Uyghur monk turned diplomat of the "Nestorian" Church of the East in China.
- Mar Yaballaha III, was Patriarch of the East
- Jakhangir Khoja, was a member of the influential Afaqi khoja clan

== Republic of China politicians ==
- Isa Yusuf Alptekin
- Masud Sabri

== First East Turkestan Republic ==
- Sabit Damulla Abdulbaki
- Abdullah Bughra
- Mahmut Muhiti
- Muhammad Amin Bughra
- Nur Ahmad Jan Bughra
- Isma'il Beg
- Timur Beg
- Islam Akhun
- Khoja Niyaz

== Second East Turkestan Republic ==
- Abdukerim Abbasov
- Ehmetjan Qasimi
- Gheni Batur

== People's Republic of China politicians ==
- Zulfiya Abdiqadir
- Ablet Abdureshit
- Abdurehim Haji Amin
- Ismail Tiliwaldi
- Mahinur Qasimi
- Muhemmetimin Iminov
- Nur Bekri
- Seypidin Azizi
- Abdulla Zakirov
- Shohrat Zakir
- Tömür Dawamat
- Abdurehim Amet
- Erkinjan Turahun
- Menglik Siyit
- Memtimin Qadir
- Neyim Yasin
- Sattar Sawut

== Business ==
- Alijan Ibragimov (1953–2021), Kazakh oligarch and former billionaire
- Alimzhan Tokhtakhunov (born 1949), Russian businessman, billionaire, and suspected criminal
- Mutallip Hajim

== Politics (abroad) ==
- Nury Turkel, American politician
- Karim Massimov, Kazakh politician
- Sadia Rashid, Pakistani politician
- Arfiya Eri, Japanese politician

=== Elders ===
- Tata-tonga, Mongolian scribe who adapted the Old Uyghur alphabet in the form of the Mongolian script
- Yuldash Akhunbabaev (1885–1943), Soviet Uzbek politician and founding father of the Uzbek Soviet Socialist Republic
- Ismail Yusupov

== Writers and poets ==
- Mahmud al-Kashgari
- Yusuf Balasaghuni (born c. 1019; died 1077), poet, statesman, vizier, Maturidi theologian and philosopher from the ancient city of Balasaghun
- Ali-Shir Nava'i
- Ahmad Yasawi
- Mirza Muhammad Haidar Dughlat
- Al-farabi
- Ahmad Yugnaki
- Turghun Almas
- Kahar Barat (born 1950), Uyghur-American historian known for his work on Buddhism and Islam in Xinjiang
- Jian Bozan
- Durnyam Mashurova
- Lutpulla Mutellip
- Abdurehim Ötkür
- Zordun Sabir
- Ziya Samedi
- Musa Sayrami (1836–1917), historian from Xinjiang known for his account of the Dungan Revolt
- Tohti Tunyaz
- Abduxaliq Uyghur
- Nurmemet Yasin
- Nur Luke
- Zunun Kadir
- Ghulam Osman Yaghma
- Ahmatjan Osman

== Military ==
- Dadash Babazhanov (1922–1985), awarded the title Hero of the Soviet Union in 1945
- Masim Yakobov (1914–1974), awarded the title Hero of the Soviet Union in 1945

== Independence leaders ==
- Abdulehed Nur
- Ghulam Osman Yaghma
- Salih Hudayar
- Anwar Yusuf Turani (born 1962), Uyghur separatist leader

== Scientists ==
- Shoukhrat Mitalipov (born 1961), American microbiologist at the Oregon Health & Science University in Portland
- Wushour Silamu (born 1941), computer scientist and professor at Xinjiang University in Ürümqi
- Idris Hasan, computer engineer and activist
- Ilham Tohti, Uyghur economist
- Ibrahim Muti'i, was a well-known linguist
- Tashpolat Tiyip, Chinese geographer of Uyghur ethnicity who was president of Xinjiang University
- Hakeem Muhammad Saeed (1920–1998), Pakistani medical researcher
- Hakim Abdul Hameed (1908–1999), Indian medical researcher
- Rahile Dawut, Uyghur ethnographer known for her expertise in Uyghur folklore and traditions.
- Lekim Ibragimov, graphic artist, painter, professor and academician of the Arts Academy of Uzbekistan

== Musicians ==
- Quddus Khojamyarov
- Erkin Abdulla, Uyghur-American singer
- Abdulla Abdurehim
- Dilnaz Akhmadieva
- Amannisa Khan
- Wumuti (Umut Tursun), member of South Korea-based group XLOV
- Abdurahim Hamidov, Uzbek musician
- Dilber
- Omar Akhun
- Murat Nasyrov
- Turdi Akhun
- Shuhrat Razzaqov
- Haj Ghorban Soleimani
- Sanubar Tursun
- Benjamin Yusupov (born 1962), classical composer, conductor, and pianist
- Omar Akram
- Ablajan Awut Ayup
- Aziz Ibrahim
- Yulduz Usmonova (born 1963), Uzbek singer, songwriter, composer, and actress
- Perhat Khaliq
- Shirinay Gao (Curley G)
- Newqiran Yüsüp, Uyghur rapper
- Dilhumar Khalif (Hu Ma'er)

== Television hosts ==
- Nëghmet Raxman (born 1983)

== Actors ==
- Dilraba Dilmurat (born 1992)
- Gülnezer Bextiyar (born 1992)
- Madina Memet (born 1987)
- Merxat Yalkun (born 1991), Chinese actor
- Hankiz Omar (born 1996), Chinese actress
- Kurban Tulum (1887–1975), promoted by the Chinese Communist Party as a symbol of unity

== Sports ==
=== Basketball ===
- Adiljan Jun, retired professional basketball player
- Abudushalamu Abudurexiti, professional basketball player
- Shirelijan Muxtar, professional basketball player
- Adiljan Suleyman, Chinese basketballer

=== Football ===
- Behram Abduweli,
- Şükür Toğrak, Turkish football player
- Emirhan İlkhan, Turkish football player
- Bedirhan Özyurt. Turkish football player
- Akmal Bakhtiyarov, Kazakh footballer
- Dzhamaldin Khodzhaniyazov, Turkmen-Russian professional football player
- Ilzat Akhmetov, Kyrgyz-Russian professional football player, midfielder of the Russia national football team
- Khojiakbar Alijonov, Uzbek professional footballer
- Nematjan Zakirov, Kyrgyz football coach
- Ruslan Baltiyev, former Kazakh footballer
- Abduhamit Abdugheni, Chinese footballer
- Abdulla Abduwal, Chinese footballer
- Abduwali Ablet, Chinese footballer
- Abdurasul Abudulam, Chinese footballer
- Haliq Abraham, Chinese footballer
- Anwar Memet-Ali, Chinese footballer
- Bari Mohamedali, Chinese footballer
- Bebet Murat, Chinese footballer
- Behtiyar Memetimin, Chinese footballer
- Bughrahan Skandar, Chinese footballer
- Danyar Musajan, Chinese footballer
- Dilmurat Batur, Chinese footballer
- Dilmurat Mawlanyaz-Chinese footballer
- Dilxat Ablimit, Chinese footballer
- Elizat Abdureshit, Chinese footballer
- Eniwar Ekremjan, Chinese footballer
- Erpan Erzimjan, Chinese footballer
- Exmetjan Ekber, Chinese footballer
- Ilhamjan Iminjan, Chinese footballer
- Ilyas Ilhar (born 1997), Chinese footballer
- Kurban Ibrahim, Chinese footballer
- Mehmud Abdukerem, Chinese footballer
- Memet-Abdulla Ezmat, Chinese footballer
- Minem Mehmudjan, Chinese footballer
- Mijit Arapat, Chinese footballer
- Mirahmetjan Muzepper, Chinese footballer
- Mirza'ekber Alimjan, Chinese footballer
- Muhamet Ghopur, Chinese footballer
- Mustahan Mijit, Chinese footballer
- Nebijan Muhmet, Chinese footballer
- Nizamdin Ependi, Chinese footballer
- Ötkür Hesen, Chinese footballer
- Rahimjan Ekber, Chinese footballer
- Salajidin Akramjan, Chinese footballer
- Shewket Yalqun, Chinese footballer
- Shirmemet Ali, Chinese footballer
- Tohtaji Ablikim, Chinese footballer
- Yehya Ablikim, Chinese footballer

=== Olympians ===
- Mehmet Tursun Chong (born 1988), Chinese olympic boxer
- Nariman Kurbanov (born 1997), Kazakh artistic gymnast and silver medalist at the 2024 Summer Olympics
- Dinigeer Yilamujiang (born 2001), Chinese cross-country skier and last torchbearer at the 2022 Winter Olympics

=== Other sports figures ===
- Adili Hushur (born 1971), Chinese tightrope walker
- Rouzi Memet (born 1983), professional snooker player
- Paliha (born 1996), Chinese wrestler

== Religious ==
- Huseyincan Celil, Uyghur Imam in Canada
- Abdur Rahman Kashgarhi of Bangladesh
- Mukarram Ahmad, Imam in India
- Suliman Gani, Imam in Great Britain
- Juma Teyir (1940–2014), assassinated in 2014 by Uyghur extremists
- ʽAbd al-Qadir Badayuni (1540–1615)
- Qutbuddin Bakhtiar Kaki (1173–1235)
- Abdul Halim Bukhari (1945–2022), Bangladeshi islamic scholar
- Ubaidul Haq, Bangladeshi islamic scholar
- Alimjan Yimit, imprisoned house church clergyman

== Guantanamo Bay detainees ==
- Adel Abdulhehim (born 1974)
- Dawut Abdurehim
- Edham Mamet
- Akhdar Qasem Basit
- Abu Bakker Qassim
- Arkin Mahmud
- Yusef Abbas
- Abd Al Sabr Abd Al Hamid Uthman
- Abdu Supur
- Ahmed Adil
- Hassan Anvar
- Ahmad Tourson (born 1971), unlawfully detained in Guantanamo Bay
- Sadik Ahmad Turkistani, opponent of the Taliban

== Other ==
- Ismail Semed (?–2007), Uyghur activist executed for possession of illegal firearms and explosives
- Örkesh Dölet (born 1968), political commentator known for his leading role in the 1989 Tiannamen Square protests
- Abdul Shakoor al-Turkistani (1965–2012), the emir of the East Turkistan Islamic Party
- Abu Omar al-Turkistani (?–2017), high-ranking commander for the Islamic Jihad Union, the Al-Nusra Front, and the Turkistan Islamic Party in Syria
- Abdul Haq al-Turkistani (born 1971), leader of the Turkistan Islamic Party since 2003
- Abdurehim Gheni, "Amsterdam's Lonely Uyghur"
- Rushan Abbas (born 1967), American Uyghur activist
- Rebiya Kadeer (born 1946), Uyghur activist
- Dolkun Isa (born 1967), Uyghur activist
- Qemberxanim, dancer
