= Mexmut Sulayman =

Mexmut Sulayman مەخمۇت سۇلايمان
- Born: June 5, 1968; Kashgar, Xinjiang, China
- Died: November 23, 2020 (aged 52); Ürümqi, Xinjiang, China
- Genres: Folks
- Years active: 1990–2020

Mexmut Sulayman (Uyghur: مەخمۇت سۇلايمان; Chinese: 麦合木提·苏莱曼; June 5, 1968 – November 23, 2020) was a Uyghur singer and musician from Xinjiang of China. Sulayman has studied dancing in Xinjiang Arts Institute in 1981, and entered Kashgar Art Troupe in 1985 after the graduation. In 1990, he formed a band called Riwayet and started to perform music.

== Early life ==
Mexmut Sulayman was a Uyghur musician known for Uyghur rock, folk and pop music. He performed the film score music for the Uyghur film This Is Not A Dream directed by Shirzat Yaqup, based on a short story of the same name by Memtimin Hoshur.

== Career ==
Sulayman served as a judge on the reality talent show The Voice of the Silk Road.

== Death ==
He died on 23 November 2020 in Ürümqi due to sudden cardiac arrest after heart attack.

== See also ==
- Abdulla Abdurehim
- Adil Mijit
- Erkin Abdulla
- Ablajan Awut Ayup
