= Timeline of the Karluks =

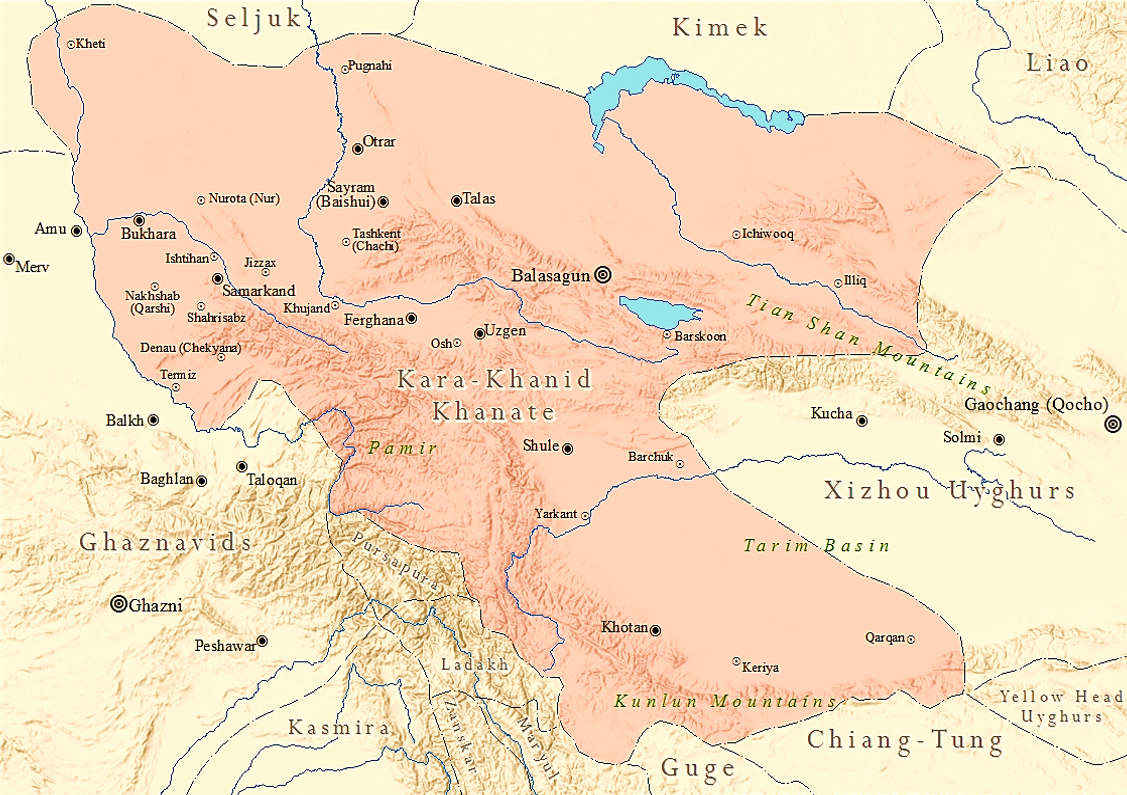
The map of Kara-Khanid Khanate as of 1006 AD when it reached its greatest extent

This is a timeline of the Karluks. The Kara-Khanid Khanate is also included; however, it is disputed whether the Karluks or Yagmas were the dominant group within the khanate.

== 7th century ==
| Year | Date | Event |
|---|---|---|
| 600 | | Karluks migrate into Tokharistan |

== 8th century ==
| Year | Date | Event |
|---|---|---|
| 742 | | The Karluks, Basmyls, and Uyghurs revolt against the Second Turkic Khaganate and Kutluk Yabgu Khagan is killed |
| 745 | | Hostilities between the Uyghurs and Karluks force the Karluks to migrate west into Zhetysu |
| 751 | | Battle of Talas: Karluks switch sides from the Tang dynasty to the Abbasids, resulting in Tang defeat |
| 766 | | Karluks annex the Turgesh in Zhetysu |
| 791 | | Karluks attack Beshbalik but are defeated by Uyghurs |

== 9th century ==
| Year | Date | Event |
|---|---|---|
| 821 | | Uyghurs invade Karluk territory and steal considerable booty |
| 839 | | Nuh ibn Asad of the Samanids attacks the Karluks and captures Sayram |
| 840 | | Uyghur Khaganate falls and Bilge Kul Qadir Khan of the Karluks declares himself khagan of the Kara-Khanid Khanate |
| 893 | | Isma'il ibn Ahmad of the Samanids attacks the Karluks and conquers Taraz |
| 893 | | Bilge Kul Qadir Khan dies and Bazir Arslan Khan succeeds him |

== 10th century ==
| Year | Date | Event |
|---|---|---|
| 920 | | Bazir Arslan Khan dies and his brother Oghulcak Khan succeeds him |
| 932 | | The future Sultan Satuq Bughra Khan converts to Islam |
| 940 | | Oghulcak Khan dies and Sultan Satuq Bughra Khan succeeds him |
| 955 | | Sultan Satuq Bughra Khan dies and Musa Bughra Khan succeeds him |
| 958 | | Musa Bughra Khan dies and Suleyman Arslan Khan succeeds him |
| 970 | | Suleyman Arslan Khan dies and Ali Arslan Khan succeeds him |
| 976 | | Kara-Khanid Khanate conquers Ilaq |
| 980 | | Kara-Khanid Khanate conquers Kashgar |
| 990 | | Kara-Khanid Khanate conquers Sayram (city) |
| 991 | | Kara-Khanid Khanate conquers Fergana |
| 992 | | Kara-Khanid Khanate conquers Bukhara but immediately loses it again to the Samanids |
| 996 | | Kara-Khanid Khanate conquers Chach |
| 997 | | Kara-Khanid Khanate conquers Samarkand |
| 998 | | Ali Arslan Khan dies and Ahmad Arslan Qara Khan succeeds him |
| 999 | | Kara-Khanid Khanate conquers Bukhara |

== 11th century ==
| Year | Date | Event |
|---|---|---|
| 1006 | | Kara-Khanid Khanate conquers Khotan |
| 1008 | | Kara-Khanid Khanate attacks the Ghaznavids but is defeated |
| 1017 | | Ahmad Arslan Qara Khan dies and Mansur Arslan Khan succeeds him |
| 1017 | | Liao dynasty attacks the Kara-Khanid Khanate but is repulsed |
| 1024 | | Mansur Arslan Khan dies and Muhammad Toghan Khan succeeds him |
| 1020 | | Ali-Tegin, brother of Yusuf Qadir Khan, seizes Bukhara and occupies Sogdia |
| 1024 | | Ali-Tegin is defeated Yusuf Qadir Khan but recaptures his former territories after his enemies retreat |
| 1026 | | Muhammad Toghan Khan dies and Yusuf Qadir Khan succeeds him |
| 1032 | | Battle of Dabusiyya: Altun Tash of the Ghaznavids attacks Ali-Tegin and the battle ends inconclusively |
| 1032 | | Yusuf Qadir Khan dies |
| 1034 | | Ali-Tegin dies and Ebu Shuca Sulayman succeeds him |
| 1042 | | The Kara-Khanid Khanate splits into eastern and western branches - Ebu Shuca Sulayman continues to control the Eastern Karakhanids while Muhammad Arslan Qara Khan controls the Western Karakhanids |
| 1050 | | Eastern Karakhanids conquer Kucha and Qiemo |
| 1052 | | Muhammad Arslan Qara Khan of the Western Karakhanids dies and Böritigin succeeds him |
| 1056 | | Ebu Shuca Sulayman of the Eastern Karakhanids dies and Muhammad bin Yusuph succeeds him |
| 1057 | | Muhammad bin Yusuph of the Eastern Karakhanids dies and İbrahim bin Muhammad Khan succeeds him |
| 1059 | | İbrahim bin Muhammad Khan of the Eastern Karakhanids dies and Mahmud succeeds him |
| 1068 | | Böritigin of the Western Karakhanids dies and Nasr Shams al-Mulk succeeds him |
| 1075 | | İbrahim bin Muhammad Khan of the Eastern Karakhanids dies and Umar succeeds him, and Ebu Ali el-Hasan succeeds him |
| 1080 | | Nasr Shams al-Mulk of the Western Karakhanids dies and Khidr succeeds him |
| 1081 | | Khidr of the Western Karakhanids dies and Ahmad succeeds him |
| 1089 | | Seljuk Empire conquers Bukhara and Samarkand and vassalizes the Kara-Khanid Khanate |
| 1089 | | Ahmad of the Western Karakhanids is restored to power but is killed by the ulama and Ya'qub Qadir Khan succeeds him |
| 1095 | | Ya'qub Qadir Khan of the Western Karakhanids dies and Mas'ud succeeds him |
| 1097 | | Mas'ud of the Western Karakhanids dies and Sulayman Qadir Tamghach succeeds him, and Mahmud Arslan Khan succeeds him |
| 1099 | | Mahmud Arslan Khan of the Western Karakhanids dies and Jibrail Arslan Khan succeeds him |

== 12th century ==
| Year | Date | Event |
|---|---|---|
| 1102 | | Jibrail Arslan Khan of the Western Karakhanids dies and Muhammad Arslan Khan succeeds him |
| 1102 | | Ebu Ali el-Hasan of the Eastern Karakhanids dies and Ahmad Khan succeeds him |
| 1128 | | Ahmad Khan of the Eastern Karakhanids dies and İbrahim bin Ahmad succeeds him |
| 1129 | | Muhammad Arslan Khan of the Western Karakhanids dies and Nasr succeeds him, and Ahmad Qadir Khan succeeds him |
| 1130 | | Ahmad Qadir Khan of the Western Karakhanids dies and Hasan Jalal ad-Dunya succeeds him |
| 1130 | | Seljuk Empire conquers Samarkand |
| 1132 | | Hasan Jalal ad-Dunya of the Western Karakhanids dies and Ibrahim Rukn ad-Dunya succeeds him, and Mahmud succeeds him |
| 1133 | | Qara Khitai conquers Balasagun |
| 1137 | | Western Karakhanids are defeated by Qara Khitai at Khujand |
| 1141 | | Battle of Qatwan: The Qara Khitai defeat the Seljuk Empire and vassalizes the Khwarazmian dynasty, the Kingdom of Qocho, and the Kara-Khanid Khanate |
| 1141 | | Mahmud of the Western Karakhanids dies and Ibrahim Tabghach Khan succeeds him |
| 1156 | | Ibrahim Tabghach Khan of the Western Karakhanids dies and Mas'ud Tabghach Khan succeeds him |
| 1158 | | İbrahim bin Ahmad of the Eastern Karakhanids dies and Muhammad bin İbrahim succeeds him |
| 1160 | | Western Kharakhanids conquer Balkh |
| 1171 | | Mas'ud Tabghach Khan of the Western Karakhanids dies and Muhammad Tabghach Khan succeeds him |
| 1178 | | Muhammad Tabghach Khan of the Western Karakhanids dies and Ibrahim Arslan Khan succeeds him |

== 13th century ==
| Year | Date | Event |
|---|---|---|
| 1204 | | Qara Khitai and Karakhanid troops aid Khwarazmian dynasty in fighting the Ghurid dynasty |
| 1204 | | Ibrahim Arslan Khan of the Western Karakhanids dies and Uthman Ulugh Sultan succeeds him |
| 1205 | | Yusuph bin Muhammad of the Eastern Karakhanids dies and Ebul Feth Muhammad succeeds him |
| 1211 | | Eastern Karakhanids are eliminated in a revolt in Kashgar |
| 1212 | | Muhammad II of Khwarezm annexes the Western Karakhanids |

== Bibliography ==
- Andrade, Tonio (2016), The Gunpowder Age: China, Military Innovation, and the Rise of the West in World History, Princeton University Press, ISBN 978-0-691-13597-7.
- Asimov, M.S. (1998), History of civilizations of Central Asia Volume IV The age of achievement: A.D. 750 to the end of the fifteenth century Part One The historical, social and economic setting, UNESCO Publishing
- Barfield, Thomas (1989), The Perilous Frontier: Nomadic Empires and China, Basil Blackwell
- Barrett, Timothy Hugh (2008), The Woman Who Discovered Printing, Great Britain: Yale University Press, ISBN 978-0-300-12728-7 (alk. paper)
- Beckwith, Christopher I (1987), The Tibetan Empire in Central Asia: A History of the Struggle for Great Power among Tibetans, Turks, Arabs, and Chinese during the Early Middle Ages, Princeton University Press
- Biran, Michal (2005), The Empire of the Qara Khitai in Eurasian History: Between China and the Islamic World, Cambridge University Press
- Bregel, Yuri (2003), An Historical Atlas of Central Asia, Brill
- Davidovich, E. A. (1998), "The Karakhanids", in Asimov, M.S.; Bosworth, C.E. (eds.), History of Civilisations of Central Asia (PDF), vol. 4 part I, UNESCO Publishing, p. 120, ISBN 92-3-103467-7
- Drompp, Michael Robert (2005), Tang China And The Collapse Of The Uighur Empire: A Documentary History, Brill
- Ebrey, Patricia Buckley (1999), The Cambridge Illustrated History of China, Cambridge: Cambridge University Press, ISBN 0-521-66991-X (paperback).
- Ebrey, Patricia Buckley; Walthall, Anne; Palais, James B. (2006), East Asia: A Cultural, Social, and Political History, Boston: Houghton Mifflin, ISBN 0-618-13384-4
- Golden, Peter. B. (1990), "The Karakhanids and Early Islam", in Sinor, Denis (ed.), The Cambridge History of Early Inner Asia, Cambridge University Press, ISBN 0-521-2-4304-1
- Golden, Peter B. (1992), An Introduction to the History of the Turkic Peoples: Ethnogenesis and State-Formation in Medieval and Early Modern Eurasia and the Middle East, OTTO HARRASSOWITZ · WIESBADEN
- Golden, Peter B. (2011), Central Asia in World History, Oxford University Press
- Graff, David A. (2002), Medieval Chinese Warfare, 300-900, Warfare and History, London: Routledge, ISBN 0415239559
- Graff, David Andrew (2016), The Eurasian Way of War Military Practice in Seventh-Century China and Byzantium, Routledge, ISBN 978-0-415-46034-7.
- Grousset, Rene (2004), The Empire of the Steppes, Rutgers University Press
- Hansen, Valerie (2012), The Silk Road: A New History, Oxford University Press
- Haywood, John (1998), Historical Atlas of the Medieval World, AD 600-1492, Barnes & Noble
- Latourette, Kenneth Scott (1964), The Chinese, their history and culture, Volumes 1-2, Macmillan
- Lorge, Peter A. (2008), The Asian Military Revolution: from Gunpowder to the Bomb, Cambridge University Press, ISBN 978-0-521-60954-8
- Millward, James (2009), Eurasian Crossroads: A History of Xinjiang, Columbia University Press
- Moriyasu, Takao (2004), Die Geschichte des uigurischen Manichäismus an der Seidenstrasse: Forschungen zu manichäischen Quellen und ihrem geschichtlichen Hintergrund, Otto Harrassowitz Verlag
- Needham, Joseph (1986), Science & Civilisation in China, vol. V:7: The Gunpowder Epic, Cambridge University Press, ISBN 0-521-30358-3
- Rong, Xinjiang (2013), Eighteen Lectures on Dunhuang, Brill
- Shaban, M. A. (1979), The ʿAbbāsid Revolution, Cambridge: Cambridge University Press, ISBN 0-521-29534-3
- Sima, Guang (2015), Bóyángbǎn Zīzhìtōngjiàn 54 huánghòu shīzōng 柏楊版資治通鑑54皇后失蹤, Yuǎnliú chūbǎnshìyè gǔfèn yǒuxiàn gōngsī, ISBN 978-957-32-0876-1
- Skaff, Jonathan Karam (2012), Sui-Tang China and Its Turko-Mongol Neighbors: Culture, Power, and Connections, 580-800 (Oxford Studies in Early Empires), Oxford University Press
- Soucek, Svatopluk (2000), A history of Inner Asia, Cambridge University Press
- Starr, S. (2015), Xinjiang: China's Muslim Borderland, Routledge
- Tetley, G.E. (2009), Ghaznavid and Seljuk Turks: Poetry as a Source for Iranian History, Routledge
- Thum, Rian (2012), Modular History: Identity Maintenance before Uyghur Nationalism, The Association for Asian Studies, Inc.
- Wang, Zhenping (2013), Tang China in Multi-Polar Asia: A History of Diplomacy and War, University of Hawaii Press
- Wilkinson, Endymion (2015). Chinese History: A New Manual, 4th edition. Cambridge, MA: Harvard University Asia Center distributed by Harvard University Press. ISBN 9780674088467.
- Yuan, Shu (2001), Bóyángbǎn Tōngjiàn jìshìběnmò 28 dìèrcìhuànguánshídài 柏楊版通鑑記事本末28第二次宦官時代, Yuǎnliú chūbǎnshìyè gǔfèn yǒuxiàn gōngsī, ISBN 957-32-4273-7
- Xiong, Victor Cunrui (2000), Sui-Tang Chang'an: A Study in the Urban History of Late Medieval China (Michigan Monographs in Chinese Studies), U OF M CENTER FOR CHINESE STUDIES, ISBN 0892641371
- Xiong, Victor Cunrui (2009), Historical Dictionary of Medieval China, United States of America: Scarecrow Press, Inc., ISBN 978-0810860537
- Xue, Zongzheng (1992), Turkic peoples, 中国社会科学出版社
