= Abdurehim =

Abdurehim is both a Uyghur given and last name. Notable people with the name (including as a patronymic) include:

- Abdurehim Ötkür (1923–1995), Uyghur poet and writer
- Abdurehim Haji Imin (1943–2011), Uyghur politician of the PRC
- Abdurehim Heyit (born 1962), Uyghur folk singer‌ and compositor
- Dawut Abdurehim (born 1974), Uyghur refugee and Guantanamo Bay detainee
- Abdulla Abdurehim, Uyghur actor and singer
