= The Voice of the Silk Road =

- Also known as: The Voice of the Silk Road
- يىپەك يولى ساداسى 丝绸之路好声音; Sīchóu Zhī Lù Hǎo Shēngyīn
- Genre: Reality television
- Judges: Abdulla Abdurehim (2014–present); Mominjan Ablikim & Mewlan Memtimin (2020–present); Tashmuhemmet Batur & Aygul Ghulam (2020–present); Erkin Abdulla (2014–2018); Mahmut Sulayman (2014–2018); Nurnisa Abbas (2014–2018); Sanubar Tursun (2016–2018)
- Country of origin: China
- Original language: Uyghur
- No. of episodes: 4

Production
- Running time: By episode
- Production company: Talpa

Original release
- Network: XJTV-9
- Release: 2014 – present

Related
- The Voice franchise Sister show: The Voice of China; Original: The Voice of Holland

The Voice of the Silk Road (Uyghur: يىپەك يولى ساداسى, romanized: Yipek Yoli Sadasi, Йипәк Йоли Садаси; Chinese: 丝绸之路好声音; pinyin: Sīchóu Zhī Lù Hǎo Shēngyīn) is a reality talent show based in Xinjiang, China and broadcast in the Uyghur language. The television show airs regularly on Xinjiang Television Channel 9. The show is recorded at the Xinjiang Arts Institute Concert Hall.

The show premiered on 31 October 2014 as the first Uyghur televised singing competition of its kind and received positive reviews from the start.

== Format ==
The television program is primarily conducted in Uyghur with Mandarin Chinese subtitles; occasionally, particularly when there are non-Uyghur, Mandarin-speaking contestants, participants and/or judges may converse in Mandarin, with Uyghur subtitles provided. Songs are typically sung in Uyghur, sometimes in Mandarin Chinese and occasionally in English. Contestants are typically, but not always, aspiring singers from Xinjiang or surrounding areas, including residents of other parts of China as well as Central Asia.

The format is similar to that of other television shows in The Voice franchise. The series consists of three phases: a blind audition, a battle phase and live performance shows. Prior to the start of the show there is a pre-screening process, to determine who may enter the competition; successful contestants may enter the blind audition phase of the competition. Only a select few contestants advance to the blind audition phase which is broadcast live on television.

At the start of the series four judges choose teams of contestants through a live blind audition process; these teams will be coached by their selected judge during the competition. Contestants come forward to sing a selected song on stage with the judges' backs turned. A judge who likes the contestant's performance and would like to mentor that performer may then press a button attached to his/her seat to indicate that the judge has accepted the performer for his/her team. Each judge has the length of the auditioner's performance to decide if he/she will accept that singer on his/her team.

After the live blind audition, all judges turn around their chairs, the singer introduces himself/herself and then the judges may elect to provide feedback or ask further questions. Judges cannot retroactively select a performer after the live blind audition has finished. It is possible that no judges may accept a performer, in which case that performer may automatically be eliminated from the competition. If only one judge accepts the performer, that singer is automatically on his/her team. If two or more judges accept the same singer, as happens frequently, the singer has the final choice of coach; during this time the accepting judges may also attempt to convince the performer to choose his/her team. Finally, the performer chooses his/her coach among the accepting judges and joins that team.

The singer then competes with other singers in the battle phase, in which singers from the same team compete head to head while singing the same song and the best singers are selected to continue. The performances are no longer blind; judges will see both singers on stage simultaneously and compare their performance. Judges then evaluate the performers and provide feedback, selecting the stronger performers to remain on the team and continue with the competition. Following that is the live performance shows phase. Contestants are gradually eliminated until one winner remains.

== Judges ==
The judges for the fourth season were:

- Erkin Abdulla (2014–present), known for pop music, world music, fusion and flamenco guitar
- Abdulla Abdurehim (2014–present), known for acting and pop music
- Mahmut Sulayman (2014–2018), known for pop music and rock music, died in 2020
- Nurnisa Abbas (2014–present), known for opera singing
- Sanubar Tursun (2016–2018), known for classical songs

=== Season four judges ===
- Abdulla Abdurehim, special judge
- Mominjan Ablikim-Alnuri Group, (season four, 2020)
- Mewlan Memtimin-Tartuq Group, (season four, 2020)
- Tashmuhemmet Batur-Aylinaz Group, (season four, 2020)
- Aygul Ghulam-Qaydu Group, (season four, 2020)

== See also ==
- The Voice worldwide franchise of reality singing competitions
- The Voice of Holland, the original show on which subsequent The Voice shows are based
- The Voice of China, a sister show in Mandarin Chinese language featuring aspiring singers from across mainland China
