= Sanubar Tursun =

Uyghur singer-songwriter (born 1971)

Sanubar Tursun سەنۇبەر تۇرسۇن
- Born: 1 June 1971 (age 55); Ghulja, Xinjiang, China
- Disappeared: 1 November 2018; Ürümqi, Xinjiang, China
- Status: Alleged 5 years imprisonment
- Education: Xinjiang Arts Institute
- Occupations: Artist, classical song singer
- Years active: 2000-present

Sanubar Tursun (Uyghur: سەنۇبەر تۇرسۇن, romanized: Senuber Tursun; Chinese: 塞努拜尔·吐尔逊; pinyin: Sāinǔbài'ěr Tǔ'ěrxùn; born 1 June 1971) is a Uyghur female singer-songwriter, famous dutar player and researcher for Uyghur Muqams. Tursun released her first album in 2000. She was a judge in the Uyghur language The Voice of the Silk Road.

== Early life ==
Sanubar was born in Ghulja, to musician Tursun Chang. Her father taught her to play stringed instruments including dutar and satar. She trained and worked professionally as a chang (hammer dulcimer) player.

In May 2014, she gave a performance at University of London.

On 7 August 2016, she appeared in Los Angeles.

== Disappearance ==
Her scheduled performances in the French cities of Nantes, Angers and Rennes were cancelled in November 2018 after she encountered difficulties leaving China. Rumors claimed that she was detained by the Chinese authorities in November 2018 and allegedly sentenced to 5 years in prison. Her concert in Shanghai in November 2019 was cancelled.

== See also ==
- Adil Mijit
- Rahile Dawut
- Abdurehim Heyit
