= Zulfiya =

Zulfiya is a given name. Notable people with the name include:

- Zulfiya Chinshanlo (born 1993), Kazakh weightlifter
- Zulfiya Zabirova (born 1973), Russian professional cycle racer
- Zulfiya Isroilova (1915-1996), Uzbek poet
- Zulfiya Abdiqadir (born 1966), Uyghur civil servant in the People's Republic of China
