= Ablajan Awut Ayup =

Uyghur Chinese pop singer (b. 1984)

Ablajan Awut Ayup ئابلاجان ئاۋۇت ئايۇپ
- Born: 11 November 1984 (age 42); Sanju, Xinjiang, China
- Education: Xinjiang Institute of Art (Graduated in 2006)
- Occupations: Singer, songwriter, dancer
- Years active: 2009–2018, 2026

Ablajan Awut Ayup (Uyghur: ئابلاجان ئاۋۇت ئايۇپ, Chinese: 阿卜拉江·阿吾提; pinyin: Ābolājiāng Āwútí; born 11 November 1984) is a singer, songwriter and dancer who wrote over 400 songs and was known for promoting Uyghur culture and identity as well as singing bilingual songs, in both Chinese and Uyghur.

In 2018, Radio Free Asia reported that Ablajan had been detained by police in Guma (Pishan) County. His brother reported that Ablajan had been sent to one of the Xinjiang re-education camps.Ablajan was reportedly released in 2026, releasing a new single in October that year.

== Early life ==
Ablajan was born as one of five children to a peasant family in Sanju near Guma, Pishan County. After attending a Uyghur-language school and finishing middle school in 1998, he went to a pedagogical school in Turpan on a stipend grant, studying painting for three years. He decided to become a musician at age 14, after seeing Michael Jackson on television.

Between 2001 and 2006, Ablajan was employed as an arts and music teacher in his hometown, also working as a wedding singer. In September 2006, he enrolled at Xinjiang Arts Institute, graduating with a degree in musicology in July 2008.

== Career ==
Ablajan made his debut with his song "Meshrep Nawasi" in January 2010 in the "Meshrep Concert". "Meshrep Nawasi" was republished in the English and Chinese languages. Later, "Meshrep Nawasi" became one of Ablajan's iconic songs. He published his first album "Bashlamduq (Shall We Start?)" on 10 July 2011, selling over 100,000 copies. Local businesses vied to endorse Ablajan and his face graced billboards in Xinjiang's capital, Ürümqi. He also performed children's songs. Anthropologist Darren Byler noted frequent themes of Uyghur culture in his music and described this choice as a means to "inspire hope in his audience of young Uyghurs".

English media coverage noted that despite the ongoing Xinjiang conflict, Ablajan avoided political commentary, once stating "Actually I am just a singer not a politician. I only know about music". On 28 July 2014, a concert by Ablajan, meant to broadcast live and promote ethnic unity in collaboration with local officials, was cancelled an hour before opening due to violent clashes near Kashgar that ended with at least 100 deaths. Time reported that Ablajan subsequently posted a selfie on Instagram with the caption "My name is Ablajan! I am not a terrorist.", apparently in response to the shutdown.

In 2017, BBC portrayed him as a model of integration for his appeal to both Han and Uyghur audiences. Rui Wenbin, Ablajan's manager and a former employee of Xinjiang's culture ministry described him as a potential "messenger of peace".

== Honors and awards ==
His single "Vacation" (Chinese Edition) was awarded second prize in "Xinjiang New Music Competition".

== Arrest and imprisonment ==
Radio Free Asia reported that in February 2018, Ablajan was detained and interrogated by the Sanju branch of Guma police. He was released, but arrested on 15 February. His disappearance occurred amidst a number of other arrests and disappearancs of those known to promote the Uyghur identity and Uyghur culture, as well as wider Turkic culture as a whole. Radio Free Asia cited a social media post by one of Ablajan's friends, claiming he had been previously detained following a trip to Malaysia, due to concerns over Islamist indoctrination abroad. There was further speculation whether Ablajan's arrest was related to his involvement in a "charity that benefited Uyghurs" or his outspoken identity as an Uyghur through his music. Ablajan's brother reported that Ablajan had been detained in a Xinjiang re-education camp.

In December 2022, the US-based Uyghur Human Rights Project and Chinese Human Rights Defenders reported that Ablajan had been sentenced to an eleven-year prison sentence by Hotan City District Court in December 2018. He was reportedly due for release in March 2029,but ultimately released by 2026, releasing a single that year.

== See also ==
- Abdulla Abdurehim
- Amannisa Khan
- Dilber Yunus
- Erkin Abdulla
- Murat Nasyrov
- Perhat Khaliq
- Abdurehim Heyit

General

- List of Uyghurs
