= Durnyam Mashurova =

Durnyam Mashurova (Uyghur: Дурням Машурова; Russian: Дурням Мурдиновна Машурова; born 8 March 1943) is a Uyghur writer and poet from Kazakhstan. She wrote lyrics to songs performed by Dervishi, a Uyghur music band in Almaty, Kazakhstan. Durnyam Mashurova is best known for her memoirs "A Life Lived Not in Vain" (Russian: "Не Зря Прожитая Жизнь") describing life of her husband Azat Mashurov which were published in Uyghur in 2005. This book was translated into Russian in June, 2007. In 2009, she published a new surrealistic novel "Ana Mirasi" ("Mother's Will", Russian: "Завещание Матери").
