= Qemberxanim =

Uyghur dancer and choreographer (1922–1994)

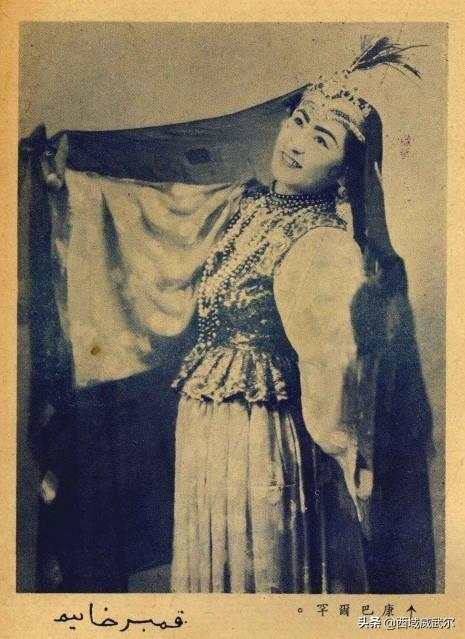
- Qemberxanim in 1947

Vice Chairwoman of the Xinjiang Regional Committee of the Chinese People's Political Consultative Conference
- In office April 1983 – January 1993
- Chairman: Ismail Yasinov; Ba Dai

Personal details
- Born: 1922 Kashgar, Xinjiang
- Died: March 1994 (aged 71–72)
- Education: Moscow Choreographic Institute
- Occupation: dancer, choreographer

Qemberxanim (Uyghur: قەمبەخان ئ‍ەمەت, Chinese: 康巴尔汗·艾买提; alternatively romanized as Kangba'erhan, Qambarkhan, or Kemberhan Emet; c. 1922 – March 1994) was a Uyghur dancer and choreographer.

== Biography ==
Qemberxanim was born in Kashgar, Xinjiang om 1922.Due to financial constraints, her family moved to a town in then Soviet Union to stay with relatives in 1927. In 1935, at the age of 13, she was admitted to the ballet studio at the Uzbek Musical-Drama Theater (later the Uzbek Republican Ballet School) led by Tamara Khanum, and two years later she was admitted to the Red Banner Ensemble in Almaty. She performed the solo dance "Boat Song", and was lead dancer in the trio dance and group dance as part of the musical Anarhan produced by the Almaty ensemble.

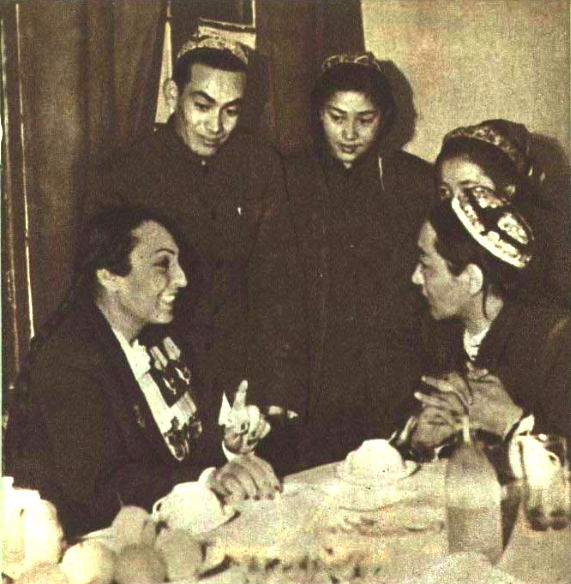
Tamara Khanum, left, speaking with Qemberxanim, right, in 1952.

In 1939, she entered The Moscow Choreographic Institute and from there she studied Ukrainian folk dance, Russian classical dance and folk dance, and Azerbaijani dance. During her studies, she performed in the Kremlin with Soviet dancer Galina Ulanova. After graduating in 1941, she returned to Tashkent and joined the local Red Banner Ensemble.

In April 1942, Qemberxanim returned to Xinjiang. In May 1942, she participated in the song and dance competition of 14 ethnic groups in Xinjiang held in Dihua. She and her younger sister won first place for their dance performances. In September 1947, as the troupe leader, she travelled to Nanjing, Shanghai, Hangzhou, and Taiwan to perform with the Xinjiang Youth Song and Dance Visiting Troupe. She was known as the "Flower of Uyghur". During her performance in Shanghai, she met with Dai Ailian and Mei Lanfang.

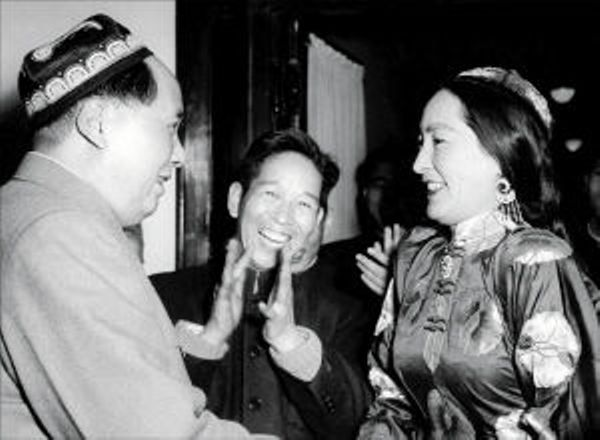
Qemberxanim, right, being received by Mao Zedong, left, during National Day activities in late September 1950.

In 1949, she performed at a gala to welcome the Chinese People's Liberation Army to Xinjiang. Several of her dances, including "Drumming", "Linpadai", and "Plate Dance", were included in the film documentary Chinese National Unity. In 1950, she travelled to Beijing as a representative of Xinjiang to participate in National Day celebrations and was received by Mao Zedong and other party and state leaders.

In the early 1950s, she created and choreographed the dances "The Liberated Girl", "The War to Resist U.S. Aggression and Aid Korea", and adapted "Liberation Army Dance". In 1956, she visited the Soviet Union with the Chinese Dancers Investigation Group. She successively served as the director of the ethnic department of Northwest Arts College, the director of the art department of Xinjiang University, the vice president of Xinjiang Arts School (the later Xinjiang Arts Institute), the chair of the Xinjiang Uyghur Autonomous Region Dancers Association, and the vice chair of the Xinjiang Uyghur Autonomous Region Federation of Literary and Art Circles. In November 1979, she was elected vice chair of the China Federation of Literary and Art Circles and vice chair of the Chinese Dancers Association. She was the vice chair of the 4th to 6th Xinjiang Committee of the CPPCC. She was also a member of the 5th to 6th National Committee of the CPPCC.

In October 1992, an art foundation named after her was established. She died in March 1994.
