= Masim Yakobov =

Soviet Uyghur private (1914–1974)

Masim Yakobovich Yakobov
- Маси́м Разуху́нович Яку́бов; Макси́м Яку́бович Яку́бов
- Born: 25 February [O.S. 10 March] 1914; Tashtykara village, Semirechye Oblast, Russian Empire (now Amangel'dy, Enbekshikazakh District, Almaty Region, Kazakhstan)
- Died: 8 July 1974 (aged 60); Alma-Ata, Kazakh SSR, USSR (now Almaty, Kazakhstan)
- Military career
- Allegiance: Soviet Union
- Branch: Red Army
- Service years: 1941–1944
- Rank: Private
- Units: 836th Rifle Regiment, 240th Rifle Division
- Conflicts: World War II
- Awards: Hero of the Soviet Union

Masim Yakobovich Yakobov (Kazakh: Масим Разухунович Якубов) (Russian: Макси́м Яку́бович Яку́бов) (25 February 1914 - 8 July 1974) was a Soviet soldier who served during World War II and recipient of the title Hero of the Soviet Union.

== Early life ==
Yakobov was born on 25 February 1914 in the village of Tashtykara in Dzharkent District, to a peasant family of Uyghur ethnicity. After receiving primary education, he worked at a collective farm.

== Military career ==
He joined the Red Army on 1941 and fought in the battles at the Eastern Front with the 836th Rifle Regiment of the 240th Rifle Division in the 38th Army of the Voronezh Front from 1942. On 12 September 1943, during a battle at Puzyrin farm, Yakobov crawled up to a German machine gun emplacement and destroyed it with hand grenades, killing 15 German soldiers.

On 26 September 1943, he was among the group of first soldiers to reach the right bank of the Dnieper near the village of Lyutezh in Vyshhorod Raion of Kyiv Oblast. He and a group of soldiers repelled German counterattacks for a day and managed to hold the line until the reinforcements arrived. On 4 October, he led his squad in attacking a group of German soldiers despite enemy mine and artillery fire, and managed to kill up to 30 German soldiers during the fighting from 4 October to 14 October 1943.

By the decree of the Presidium of the Supreme Soviet of the USSR of 13 November 1943, for the successful crossing of the Dnieper and the firm consolidation of the bridgehead on the western bank of the Dnieper, and the courage and heroism shown at the same time, Yakobov was awarded the title of Hero of the Soviet Union with the Order of Lenin and the Gold Star medal.

== Later life ==
In 1944, Yakobov was demobilized from military due to illness. He later worked as a herdsman at a collective farm in the Karasay District of the Alma-Ata Region and later resided in Alma-Ata.

Yakobov died on 8 July 1974, at the age of 60.

== Awards and honors ==
- Hero of the Soviet Union (No. 6643 - 13 November 1943)
- Order of Lenin (13 November 1943)
- Medal "For the Victory over Germany in the Great Patriotic War 1941–1945" (1945)
- jubilee medals
- In the city of Almaty, a street and school (No. 101) is named in honor of him.
