= Hüseyincan Celil =

Uyghur imam

Huseyincan Celil
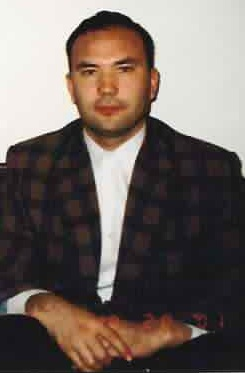
- Huseyincan Celil (Hussayin Jelil); 2001, Istanbul, Turkey.
- Born: March 1, 1969 (age 57); Kashgar, China
- Spouse: Kamila Telendibayeva
- Children: 6

Huseyincan Celil (born March 1, 1969; in Uyghur: ھۈسەيىنجان جېلىل; in Chinese: 赛因江·贾里力) is a Uyghur holding Chinese and Canadian citizenship. He was the subject of a controversial court case in 2006 when he was arrested in Uzbekistan, extradited to China against the objections of the Canadian government, and sentenced to life in prison on charges of terrorism. The conviction was based on his supposed identification with a man called Guler Dilaver, who had been wanted in Kyrgyzstan for terrorism charges.

== Names ==
Celil has been referred to by a variety of names in the media. He and his family use the name Huseyincan Celil, which appears in his Canadian passport. Amnesty International's press releases typically omit the suffix "can", referring to him simply as Huseyin Celil, or alternatively as Husein Dzhelil. Police in Uzbekistan, China, and Kyrgyzstan all claim that Huseyincan Celil is in fact an alias for Guler Dilaver, a man whose name appears on Interpol watchlists; the Uzbek embassy in London also stated in an open letter to Amnesty International that he had used a variety of other aliases such as Hussein Calil and Calil Husan Siddikovich. A variety of transcriptions of his given name Huseyincan have also appeared in the Chinese media; one common transliteration, Yushanjiang, can be misinterpreted as a Han Chinese-style name Yu Shanjiang (that is, surname Yu, given name Shanjiang); official English translations of Chinese government statements may refer to him as such. As a result, one Canadian newspaper, in turn, openly complained about the use of this "Chinese name" to refer to him, accusing Chinese officials of "refus[ing] to recognize the name on his Canadian passport ... instead call[ing] him by his Chinese name, Yu Shanjiang".

== Family and early life ==
In 1994, while Celil was living in Xinjiang, he was arrested, charged with several murders and terrorism-related activities, and imprisoned by Chinese police. He escaped from China by way of Kyrgyzstan and Turkey, and sought asylum in Ankara through the United Nations High Commission for Refugees. After the UNHCR granted him refugee status pursuant to the Geneva Convention, the Government of Canada designated him a refugee and gave him citizenship. He arrived in Canada in 2001 and acquired Canadian citizenship, living in Hamilton, Ontario. He lived in Canada with his wife, Kamila Telendibayeva, and three of his six children. He says the Chinese government prevented his other three children from emigrating to Canada. As of June 2006, his wife Kamila was reported to be pregnant with their seventh child. Celil's mother's name is Shalehan Spander; he also has a 49-year-old brother Sarmeti and a 39-year-old sister Heyrigul.

== Rearrest ==
=== Extradition from Uzbekistan ===
In early 2006 Celil travelled to Uzbekistan with his wife to visit her relatives and to try to get his other three children out of China. This trip ended in his deportation to China. On March 27, 2006, Uzbek police arrested, detained, and held Celil incommunicado while in Tashkent, attempting to renew his visitor's visa. An Uzbek government spokesman said Celil and Dilaver are the same person. Dilaver, a man born in 1955, had been placed on the Interpol watch list by the Kyrgyz government in 2002 after he attacked a Chinese delegation from Xinjiang. Uzbekistan's embassy in London stated that Celil's fingerprints matched those Kyrgyzstan had on file for Dilaver when he was arrested there on May 10, 1998. The Canadian government requested Celil's release and return to Canada, but the Uzbek government deported him to China, where he had already been convicted in absentia and could face the death penalty. Chris MacLeod, the Celil family's lawyer, criticized the Uzbek government for detaining a Canadian citizen without notifying his respective embassy, and called on the Canadian government to be more forceful in protecting the rights of its overseas citizens.

=== Trial and imprisonment in China ===
After his extradition Celil went on trial in China again in August 2006 on charges of terrorism. His name had been mentioned earlier in the sentencing documents of Ismail Semed, another Uyghur who had allegedly been his accomplice in another attack on a Chinese delegation visiting Xinjiang. Embassy spokeswoman Jennie Chen said that at the time the Chinese government offered assurances to the Canadian embassy that they would not apply the death penalty. Celil began serving a 15-year prison sentence in November 2006. He again appeared in the Urumqi Intermediate People's Court in Urumqi, Xinjiang in February 2007. The Canadian government has sent diplomats to Urumqi to lobby for Celil's release. Celil and his sister, mother, and older brother have repeatedly complained that Chinese police are torturing him. Celil's mother told Steve Chao of CTV News in China that Celil is being tortured, and that "they forced him to sign a confession, or he would be put in a hole and buried alive. He's just a loving family man who cares for his children and wants peace. All I want is for a chance to see him one last time."

Article 3 of the nationality law of the People's Republic of China states, "The People's Republic of China does not recognize dual nationality for any Chinese national." Article 9 states, "Any Chinese national who has settled abroad and who has been naturalized as a foreign national or has acquired foreign nationality of his own free will shall automatically lose Chinese nationality." Article 10 describes how a Chinese citizen may renounce Chinese nationality, and Article 11 states, "Any person who applies for renunciation of Chinese nationality shall lose Chinese nationality upon approval of his application."

Throughout his imprisonment, the Chinese government has treated Celil as a Chinese national, not recognizing his Canadian citizenship. In a press conference on May 8, 2007, Chinese Foreign Ministry spokesperson reiterated the Chinese position that Celil (referred to as "Yu", a diminutive of "Yu Shanjiang") is a Chinese citizen, saying "According to the Nationality Law of the People's Republic of China, Yu is a Chinese citizen and China does not recognize dual citizenship." The spokesperson went on to comment, "He was wanted by the Interpol in all countries including Canada before he was granted citizenship there." Article 8, Section 2 of the Consular Agreement between the two governments states that a consular officer shall be entitled to visit their State's nationals who are under detention, arrest or deprived of freedom in any other means, to converse or communicate with him and to arrange for interpretation and legal assistance. However, Li Wei, director of the Center of Counter-Terrorism, Chinese Institute of Contemporary International Relations, has stated that because Celil was on Interpol's Red List before being admitted into Canada, that agreement doesn't apply to this case. The Chinese government is required to have a Canadian diplomat present in all cases in which Canadian citizens are accused of a crime; however, no Canadian diplomat attended Celil's trial, and he has not been allowed to see either Canadian Consular officials or his lawyer. When Celil appeared in court he said Chinese secret police had tortured and starved him. In response to a demand from Canadian prime minister Stephen Harper that the Chinese government explain Celil's treatment, Chinese Foreign Ministry spokeswoman Jiang Yu said the Chinese government considers Celil a Chinese citizen and therefore the "consular agreement between China and Canada does not apply in this case." Jiang Yu also said that Celil is "a member of the East Turkestan Islamic Movement. He's a criminal."

== Views of the People's Republic of China ==
Yùshānjiāng is seen by the government of China as a critical organizer and leader of the East Turkestan Islamic Movement, a group that has been designated as a terrorist organization by the United Nations since 2002. He has been accused of the assassination of a Chinese Ambassador to Kyrgyzstan in March 2000 and the kidnapping of a Chinese officer in June 2000. He has allegedly used the aliases Huseyincan Celil as well as Guler Dilaver.

== Effect on Canada-China relations ==
In November 2006 Prime Minister Harper, President of China Hu Jintao, and 21 other national leaders attended the Asia-Pacific Economic Co-operation summit in Hanoi, Vietnam. Harper discussed Celil's case with President Hu and said, "When a Canadian citizen is taken from a third country and imprisoned in China, this is a serious concern to this country." Dan Dugas, spokesman for Foreign Affairs Minister Peter MacKay, told The Globe and Mail that MacKay called the Canadian embassy in Beijing. Dugas said, "The Chinese government is not co-operating with the Canadian mission in China and we aren't going to stop asking them for what's happening with Mr. Celil. I can tell you [Minister MacKay] is not happy either. He's asking for answers. He wants to know what is being done and what the next steps are going to be."

The dispute between the two governments escalated when He Yafei, China's assistant minister of foreign affairs for North America, told The Globe and Mail in an interview that the "economic relationship goes hand in hand with the political relationship. We need to have a sound political basis of mutual trust for the economic relationship to flourish. That's why we need to work harder to improve mutual trust." Harper responded by telling reporters in Halifax he would "point out to any Chinese official that just as a matter of fact, China had a huge trade surplus with this country, so it would be in the interest of the Chinese government to make sure any dealings on trade are fair and above board."

Harper also criticized the Canadian political opposition for its position on Celil's case, saying, "There are those in the Opposition who will say, 'You know, China is an important country, so we shouldn't really protest these things . . . so maybe someday we'll be able to sell more goods there.' I think that's irresponsible. I think the government of Canada, when a Canadian citizen is ill-treated and when the rights of a Canadian citizen need to be defended, I think it's always the obligation of the government of Canada to vocally and publicly stand up for that Canadian citizen. That is what we will continue to do."

When Harper visited China in December 2009, expectations were high that he would bring up the topic in his discussion with the Chinese leaders, as he had promised in 2007.

Politicians in the United States of America have also become involved in the case. By a voice vote on September 17, 2007, the House of Representatives passed House Resolution 497, calling on the People's Republic of China to immediately release the children of Rebiya Kadeer and Canadian citizen Huseyin Celil and to "ensure the linguistic, cultural, and religious rights of the Uyghur people" in Xinjiang.

In October 2021, Celil's wife, Kamila Telendibaeva, appeared in an interview on the Canadian television network CTV. Telendibaeva urged the Canadian government to boycott the 2022 Winter Olympics unless China frees Celil and allows him to return to Canada. Telendibaeva also stated that she had not heard anything about her husband's case from Canadian officials since Justin Trudeau assumed the Canadian prime minister's office in 2015.

== See also ==
- Ismail Semed
- Lai Changxing
- Omar Khadr
