= Azat Mashurov =

Azat Mashurovich Mashurov (Russian: Азат Машурович Машуров, 27 March 1940, Pidzhim – 15 April 2000, Jarkent) was a prominent public figure in Kazakhstan's Uyghur community. He served as the First Secretary of the Communist Party of Alakol District in Taldykorgan Province from 1980–1989. He helped drastically improve Alakol's economy, bringing Usharal, its administrative center, to a city status. He had to resign due to the changing political regime in Kazakhstan. He ended his public service career in his home village Pidzhim in Panfilov District, where he stayed in power until 1995 as Director of the Collective Farm. Mashurov's position was impacted negatively by Perestroika that first had a detrimental effect on rural agriculture. He died of a heart attack at age 60 in his home in Jarkent. In 2005, his wife, Durnyam Mashurova, published the novel "A Life Lived Not in Vain"(Russian: Не Зря Прожитая Жизнь), comprising memoirs about his life.

His daughter, Dilyaram Azatovna Masimova, is the wife of former Kazakh prime minister Karim Massimov.
