= Nurnisa Abbas =

Nurnisa Abbas نورنىسا ئابباس
- Occupation: Singer
- Instrument: Voice
- Years active: ????–present

Nurnisa Abbas (Uyghur: نورنىسا ئابباس, Chinese: 努尔尼沙·阿巴斯) is a Uyghur musician known for Uyghur opera music. She also currently serves as a judge on the reality talent show The Voice of the Silk Road.
