= Ziya Samedi =

Uyghur nationalist writer (1914–2000)

Ziya Samedi (Uyghur: زىيا سەمەد; 15 April 1914 – 20 November 2000) was a Uyghur nationalist writer who held various Chinese government posts and then emigrated to Kazakhstan.

== Biography ==
=== East Turkistan / Uyghuristan ===
Ziya Samedi was born in Yarkend County in Kazakhstan. After having gone to Soviet elementary and middle schools, he moved back to East Turkistan, settling down in Ghulja Yining City in 1930. There he founded many primary schools to promote Uyghur education, and wrote his novel The Bloody Mountain, which criticised the ethnic policy of the Chinese Nationalist government. He also rewrote Gherip Senem, a Uyghur epic poem, into a play.

Samedi was arrested in 1937 by Xinjiang's governor, Sheng Shicai and sentenced him to seven years in jail. He was released in 1944, and joined the army of the Second East Turkestan Republic. He was promoted to a Colonel, and was made in charge of military reconnaissance until the East Turkistan Republic was occupied by the People's Liberation Army of China in 1949.

From 1950 to 1958, Samedi held a number of positions in the Uyghur Autonomous Region government ruled by the Chinese Communist Party, among them regional director of education, director of culture as well as the chairman of writer's association.

In 1958, the Communist Chinese government arrested him and sent to two years of re-education through labor.

=== Soviet Union ===
After his sentence was complete, Samedi fled to the Soviet Union. From 1961, he published many novels including historical novels, among them Yillar Siri (Secret of the Years), Akhmet Ependi (Mr Akhmet), Mayimhan, and Gheni the Brave.

In the 1980s, Samedi was honored with the Kazakhstan People's Writer Award for his contribution to Uyghur literature. He died in Almaty in 2000.

== Works ==
- The Bloody Mountain
- Yillar Siri (Secret of the Years)
- Ehmet Ependi (Mr. Ehmet)
- Mayimhan
- Gheni the Brave
