= Tohtaji Ablikim =

Chinese association football player

Personal information
- Date of birth: 7 September 2002 (age 24)
- Place of birth: Artush, Xinjiang, China
- Height: 1.65 m (5 ft 5 in)
- Position: Midfielder

Team information
- Current team: Nantong Zhiyun
- Number: 35

Senior career*
Years	Team	Apps	(Gls)
2021–	Nantong Zhiyun	0	(0)
- * Club domestic league appearances and goals as of 14:01, 24 August 2021 (UTC)

Tohtaji Ablikim (Chinese: 托合塔吉·阿不力克木; born 7 September 2002) is a Chinese footballer currently playing as a midfielder for Nantong Zhiyun.

== Career statistics ==
=== Club ===
As of 24 August 2021.

Club	Season	League			Cup		Other		Total	
Club	Season	Division	Apps	Goals	Apps	Goals	Apps	Goals	Apps	Goals
Nantong Zhiyun	2021	China League One	0	0	1 (Note: Appearances in the Chinese FA Cup)	0	0	0	1	0
Career total			0	0	1	0	0	0	1	0
