= Amangel'dy =

Amangeldi Амангелді
- Village
- Location in Kazakhstan Amangeldi (Asia)
- Coordinates: 43°28′19″N 77°21′08″E
- Country: Kazakhstan
- Region: Almaty Region
- District: Enbekshikazakh District

Population (2009)
  - Total: 1,962
- Time zone: UTC+6 (Almaty Time)
- Postal code: 040414

Amangeldi (Kazakh: Амангелді, Amangeldı) is a village in Almaty Region of south-eastern Kazakhstan.
