= Shuhrat Razzaqov =

- Born: Shuhrat Razzaqov; Uzbekistan
- Instruments: dutar, tambur

Shuhrat Razzaqov is a musician from Uzbekistan. She mainly plays the dutar and tambur but also other folk instruments from Central Asia.
