= Şükür Toğrak =

Turkish footballer (born 2006)

Personal information
- Date of birth: 8 October 2006 (age 20)
- Place of birth: Hotan, Xinjiang, China
- Height: 1.85 m (6 ft 1 in)
- Position: Midfielder

Team information
- Current team: Kırklarelispor
- Number: 19

Youth career
- 2021–2022: Eroğluspor
- 2022–2023: Fenerbahçe U17
- 2023–2025: Fenerbahçe U19

Senior career*
Years	Team	Apps	(Gls)
2023–2025	Fenerbahçe	0	(0)
2025–	Kırklarelispor	10	(1)
- * Club domestic league appearances and goals as of 2 November 2025

Şükür Toğrak (simplified Chinese: 阿卜杜许库尔·托格拉克; traditional Chinese: 阿卜杜許庫爾·托格拉克; pinyin: Ābǔdùxǔkù'ěr Tuōgélākè; Uyghur: شۈكۈر توغراق; born 8 October 2006) is a Chinese-born Turkish professional footballer who plays as a midfielder for TFF 2. Lig club Kırklarelispor.

He was born in Hotan, Xinjiang, China and is of Uyghur descent.

== Career ==
After starting his youth career at Istanbul-based club Eroğluspor in 2021, Şükür moved to Fenerbahçe U17 in 2022.

In 2023–2024 season, he played with Fenerbahçe U19 and appearanced 21 matches in U19 Elit Lig and scored 1 goal.

On 24 October 2024, he was included in the senior team 18 men squad for the first time against Manchester United in a 1-1 tie UEFA Europa League 2024–2025 season league phase match.

He made his first appearance for Fenerbahçe in an unofficial friendly match against Russian side, Zenit on 15 November 2024, entered the game as a substitute, at the 60th minute replacing Zeki Dursun.

== Statistics ==
As of matches played 8 March 2025

Appearances and goals by club, season and competition
Club	Season	League			Turkish Cup		Europe		Other		Total	
Club	Season	Division	Apps	Goals	Apps	Goals	Apps	Goals	Apps	Goals	Apps	Goals
Fenerbahçe	2023–24	Süper Lig	0	0	0	0	—		21 (Note: Appearance(s) in U19 Elit A Ligi)	1	21	1
Fenerbahçe	2024–25	Süper Lig	0	0	0	0	0	0	20	1	20	1
Fenerbahçe	2025–26	Süper Lig	0	0	0	0	0	0	0	0	0	0
Career total			0	0	0	0	0	0	41	2	41	2

== International career ==
Şükür is eligible to represent either China or Turkey.

He is a youth international for Turkey, called up to the U18s first time for training camp in Antalya on 6 November 2023 and called up to the U19s first time for training camp in Istanbul on 26 December 2024.
