= Lekim Ibragimov =

- Born: 21 December 1944 (age 81); Maly Dekhan, Almaty Province, Kazakhstan
- Known for: Painting, graphics
- Notable work: Abduction of Asia, The Empress, Angels, Turfan women, Dance in the Moon, Dervish, One thousand angels and one painting
- Awards: National Artist of Uzbekistan, the Gold Medal of the Arts Academy of Uzbekistan (1998)

Lekim Ibragimov (born 1944) is an Uzbekistani graphic artist, painter, professor and academician of the Arts Academy of Uzbekistan. He is an honorary member of the Russian Academy of Arts.

== Biography ==
Lekim was born on December 21, 1944, in the village of Maly Dekhan in the Uighur district of Almaty region (Kazakhstan), in a teacher's family.

From 1964 to 1971, he studied at the Art College of Nikolai Gogol in Almaty. From 1971 to 1977, he studied at the Tashkent Theatre and Graphic Art Institute of Ostrovsky.

Starting from 1976, still being a student, Lekim Ibragimov became an active member of various national, Soviet Union wide and international exhibitions. In 1978, he was accepted to the Union of Artists. He is also a member of the Union of Artists of Uzbekistan (since 1996 - Creative association of artists under the Arts Academy of Uzbekistan).

From 1978 to 1986, Lekim Ibragimov cworked in the studio of Creative House of artists called "Sinezh", as well as in art studios of the Baltic States.

== Recognition and honours ==
In 1998, Lekim Ibragimov had been chosen as a delegate to the World Congress of Artists in Paris.

In 1999, he was elected as a full member (academician) of the Arts Academy of Uzbekistan. The same year he became a professor of the National Institute of Arts and Design of Kamoliddin Behzod.

In 2001, the academician Lekim Ibragimov was awarded the "National Artist of Uzbekistan” title.

In 2008 he became an Honorary Member of the Russian Academy of Arts.

== Art of Lekim Ibragimov ==
The style of Lekim Ibragimov combines painting, drawing and calligraphy. His works are a harmonious blend of Eastern and Western cultural heritage of modernism and poetic symbolism, traditional schools of classicism and abstractionism and surrealism.

Lekim Ibragimov is known for drawing an image of an angel or several angels on each of his paintings.

Paintings of Lekim Ibragimov are exhibited at the State Museum of Oriental Art (Moscow, Russia), State Museum of Arts of Uzbekistan (Tashkent, Uzbekistan), the Museum of East Asia (Budapest, Hungary), Novosibirsk State Art Museum (Russia), State Museum of Art of Kasteev (Almaty, Kazakhstan), Gallery of the Taufkirchen city administration (Germany). His works are also in private collections in USA, France, Italy, Israel, India, Austria, Japan, Germany and Russia.

== One thousand angels and one painting ==
In 2000 Lekim Ibragimov had an idea to create a painting based on the legendary "One Thousand and One Nights" oriental fairy tales. During 10 years he has been thinking of a concept for this art project, the implementation of which Lekim Ibragimov began in 2010. He finished his mega canvas in the spring of 2012. The project is called "One thousand angels and one painting". The name accurately reflects the projects essence, because it is a mega-canvas of 500 square meters area (8 feet high and 66 meters long), consisting of thousands individual canvases. Each painting is a complete story, depicting an angel. At a first glance you might think that it is a mosaic. However, it is not true, as a whole painting is not composed of separate unfinished pieces. There is a metamorphosis, when all the individual and independent units are combined to form a new and completely unique painting. The presentation of the canvas took place in Prague in 2012. And then in 2013 in Moscow. In 2014 in sunny Tashkent.The exhibition in Moscow was attended by the international agency for registration of records "Interrecord" and two world records were registered in the nominations "Interrecord" and "The largest number of angels in one picture".

== Awards and Titles ==
- 1998 - Gold Medal of the Arts Academy of Uzbekistan for the "Contribution to the world culture"
- 1999 - Full member (academician) of the Arts Academy of Uzbekistan
- 1999 - Professor of the National Institute of Arts and Design of Kamoliddin Behzod
- 2001 - The main jury prize of the first Tashkent Biennale of Contemporary Art
- 2001 - The title of "National Artist of Uzbekistan"
- 2005 - Awarded the title of the "Honorary Citizen" by Uygur district of Almaty region in Kazakhstan
- 2008 - Honorary Member of the Russian Academy of Arts

== Interesting Facts ==
- In 1997 a book of poems by Lekim Ibragimov was published in Switzerland. According to the artist, these poems are a kind of a rhymed credo and a reflection of his world.
- In 2009, in honor of academician Lekim Ibragimov, the Russian Academy of Arts published a poster with reproduction of his painting.
- The famous writer Chingiz Aitmatov was one of the closest friends of Lekim Ibragimov. In 2008 the artist has devoted a solo exhibition called "Stealing Asia” in Chingiz Aitmatov‘s memory at the Zurab Tsereteli Art Gallery in Moscow.
