= Muhamet Ghopur =

Chinese association football player

Personal information
- Date of birth: 21 September 1997 (age 29)
- Place of birth: Ürümqi, Xinjiang, China
- Height: 1.83 m (6 ft 0 in)
- Position: Defender

Team information
- Current team: Quzhou Xin'an

Youth career
- 2020–2021: Xinjiang Tianshan Leopard

Senior career*
Years	Team	Apps	(Gls)
2021–2022	Xinjiang Tianshan Leopard	15	(1)
2022–2023	Guangxi Hengchen		
2024–	Quzhou Xin'an		
- * Club domestic league appearances and goals as of 14:01, 31 May 2025 (UTC)

Muhamet Ghopur (Chinese: 穆哈麦提·吾普尔; born 21 September 1997) is a Chinese footballer currently playing as a defender for Quzhou Xin'an.

== Club career ==
Born in Ürümqi, Xinjiang, China, Ghopur began his career in the Xinjiang province, representing the province at the International Primary School Competition in 2010. He continued representing Ürümqi and Xianjiang in various national and international competitions, before enrolling at the Xinjiang University in 2016. He represented the university in both football and futsal, and due to his impressive performances he represented the Xinjiang College Students Football Team at the China National Youth Games.

In 2020 he joined the academy of professional club Xinjiang Tianshan Leopard, and was promoted to their first team the following year. In the first game of the 2021 season, Ghopur scored his side's consolation goal on his debut in their 2–1 loss to Meizhou Hakka on 21 April.

Following one season with Xinjiang Tianshan Leopard, he joined Guangxi Hengchen in the Chinese Champions League. Despite helping the club to the China League Two in his second year with the club, he was released at the end of the 2023 season.

== Career statistics ==
=== Club ===
As of 31 May 2025.

Appearances and goals by club, season and competition
Club	Season	League			Cup (Note: Includes Chinese FA Cup)		Other		Total	
Club	Season	Division	Apps	Goals	Apps	Goals	Apps	Goals	Apps	Goals
Xinjiang Tianshan Leopard	2021	China League One	15	1	1	0	2 (Note: Appearances in the China League One relegation playoffs)	0	18	1
Career total			15	1	1	0	2	0	18	1
