= Murat Nasyrov =

Russian singer (1969–2007)

- Born: 13 December 1969; Alma-Ata, Kazakh SSR, Soviet Union
- Died: 19 January 2007 (aged 37) Moscow, Russia
- Genres: Pop, Folk
- Occupations: Singer, songwriter
- Years active: 1991–2007
- Label: Soyuz
- Website: nasyrov.ru

Murat Ismailovich Nasyrov (Russian: Мурат Исмаилович Насыров; Uyghur: مۇرات ناسىروۋ, romanized: Murat Nasirow; 13 December 1969 – 19 January 2007) was a Soviet, Kazakhstani, and Russian singer and songwriter of Uyghur ethnicity.

== Controversy over his death ==
It is claimed that he committed suicide by jumping from a balcony on 19 January 2007. The postmortem examination of his body did not reveal any traces of alcohol or drugs.

Nasyrov's supposed suicide has been disputed. Recent reports in the Russian press have implied that he may have been the victim of foul play, as family members and friends insist that Nasyrov was not depressed and had never considered suicide before. Some suspect that he was given an LSD tablet in a glass of wine at a club and after drinking it, he experienced hallucinations and leapt off his balcony.

== Discography ==
- Step (1995; Single)
- The Boy Wants to go to Tambov (1997; Single)
- Someone Will Forgive (1997)
- My Story (1998)
- All This Was Not Me (2000)
- Wake Me Up (2002)
- Kaldim Yalguz (2004)
- 2006 {Posthumous Album Digital Release Only} (2016)
- Remixes (2010)

== See also ==
- Ablajan Awut Ayup
- Erkin Abdulla
