= Gheni Batur =

Uyghur military commander (1902–1981)

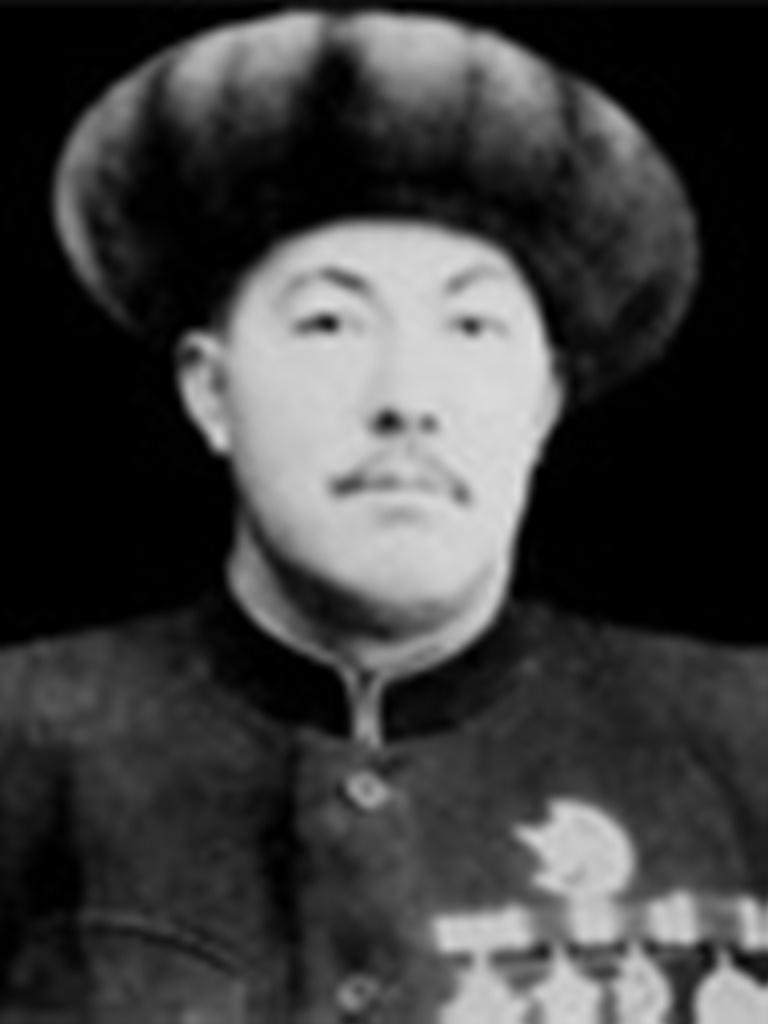

Personal details
- Born: 1902
- Died: 1981 (aged 78–79) Alma-Ata, Kazakh SSR, Soviet Union

Gheni Batur (Cyrillic Uyghur: Ғени Батур; 1902 – 29 June 1981) is a Uyghur national hero who was among the first 20 horsemen who began uprising in Nilka County of Ili valley of Xinjiang in September 1944 against Kuomintang Xinjiang provincial government, which eventually led to the establishment of Second East Turkestan Republic in northern Xinjiang (Jungaria). After the establishment of the People's Republic of China, he fled to the Soviet Union. He lies buried in Almaty.

== Bibliography ==
- Zordun Sabir, Anayurt, Almaty: Nash Mir (2006)
- Ziya Samedi, Gheni the Brave, Ghéni Batur (1902–1981)
