= Dervishi =

Uyghur-Language Kazakh Music Group

Dervishi (Russian: Дервиши) is an Uyghur music band in Kazakhstan. The group was founded in Almaty, Kazakhstan in July 1999 by four musicians: Dilmurat Baharov, Adil Zhambakiev, Aziz Massimov and Raim Khamrayev. In 1999, the band received an award for the best music arrangement for the song Zharkent Gardens (Russian: Сады Джаркента) at the International Music Festival Voice of Asia (Kazakh: Азия Даусы, Russian: Голос Азии) and prize of Golden Dombra for the competition of the seven best Kazakhstan songs within the festival. The group is a Golden Disk winner in 2000, 2001, 2002, 2003 and have toured in Hungary, Bulgaria, Uzbekistan, Kyrgyzstan, Turkey, Azerbaijan, India, Thailand producing 5 albums, 2 VCDs, 2 DVDs, and 2 musical-fairy tales.

== See also ==
- Uyghurs in Kazakhstan
