= Rahimjan Ekber =

Chinese association football player

Personal information
- Date of birth: 6 July 1999 (age 27)
- Height: 1.80 m (5 ft 11 in)
- Position: Midfielder

Team information
- Current team: Yili Nine Towns

Senior career*
Years	Team	Apps	(Gls)
2020–2023	Xinjiang Tianshan Leopard	6	(1)
2023-	Yili Nine Towns	0	(0)
- * Club domestic league appearances and goals as of 14:01, 9 August 2021 (UTC)

Rahimjan Ekber (Chinese: 艾克拜尔·热合木江; born 6 July 1999) is a Chinese footballer currently playing as a midfielder for Yili Nine Towns.

== Career statistics ==
=== Club ===
As of 17 August 2021.

Club	Season	League			Cup		Other		Total	
Club	Season	Division	Apps	Goals	Apps	Goals	Apps	Goals	Apps	Goals
Xinjiang Tianshan Leopard	2020	China League One	1	0	0	0	0	0	1	0
Xinjiang Tianshan Leopard	2021	China League One	5	1	0	0	0	0	5	1
Career total			6	1	0	0	0	0	6	1
