= Memtimin Hoshur =

Uyghur writer

Memtimin Hoshur is one of the leading writers in modern Uyghur literature. He is also a member of China Writers Association.

== Published works ==
- "Ney Awazi (نەي ئاۋازى)" - "The sound of the flute" - Shinjang Xelq Neshiriyati/Xinjiang People's Press
- "Kona - yéngi Ishlar (كونا - يېڭى ئىشلار)" - "Old things are new" - Milletler Neshiriyati/民族出版社（北京）
- "Salam, Hésam Aka (سالام، ھېسام ئاكا)" - "Hello, Brother Hesham" - Shinjang Yash-Ösmürler Neshiriyati/新疆青少年出版社
- "Bu Chüsh Emes (بۇ چۈش ئەمەس)" - "This is not a dream" - Shinjang Xelq Neshiriyati - 新疆人民出版社
- "Nuzugum (نۇزۇگۇم)" (in Mongolian) - Shinjang Xelq Neshiriyati/新疆人民出版社
- "Ölükke Xet (ئۆلۈككە خەت)" - "A letter to the dead" - Kashigher Uyghur Neshiriyati/喀什噶尔维吾尔出版社
- "On Ikki Muqamning Ili Wariyanti (ئون ئىككى مۇقامنىڭ ئىلى ۋارىيانتى)" - "Ili variant of Twelve Uyghur Muqams" - Shinjang Xelq Neshiriyati/新疆人民出版社
- "Ayxan (ئايخان)" (in Kazakh) - Shinjang Xelq Neshiriyati/新疆人民出版社

Besides, Shinjang Xelq Neshiriyati (Xinjiang People's Press) has published his selected stories and short novels titled as "مەمتىمىن ھوشۇر ھىكايىلىرىدىن تاللانما" - (Selected Stories of Memtimin Hoshur <1>, <2>) and "مەمتىمىن ھوشۇر پوۋسېتلىرىدىن تاللانما" - (Selected Short Novels of Memtimin Hoshur).

"Qum Basqan Sheher (قۇم باسقان شەھەر)" (The City Buried under Desert), published in Uyghur in 1996, is his only novel and considered to be his masterpiece.
