= Adil Mijit =

Chinese-Uyghur comedian (born 1964)

Adil Mijit ئادىل مىجىت
- Born: 1 January 1964 (age 62); Karamay, Xinjiang, China
- Disappeared: 2 November 2018; Ürümqi, Xinjiang, China
- Education: Central Academy of Drama (graduated in 1986)
- Occupations: Actor, comedian
- Years active: 1997–unknown
- Children: Adile Adil; Ötkür Adil

Adil Mijit (Uyghur: ئادىل مىجىت; Chinese: 阿迪力·米吉提; born 1 January 1964) is a prominent Uyghur comedian and one of the Chinese state first-class actors. He is famous among the Uyghur community for his dramas and comedy series and hundreds of shows in local TV. He performed his "Adil Mijit Comedy Concert" in 1997 and 2010 separately in Ürümqi. Mijit went missing from the region in November 2018.

== Early life and education ==
Adil was born in Karamay, Xinjiang, China, in 1964, into high-level engineer Mijit Zahidi's family. After graduating his high school in 1980, he started to work as technicians in an oilfield development company and as actor in Karamay Academy of Drama. In 1982, he went to Central Academy of Drama in Beijing. After his graduation he worked as an actor in Xinjiang Academy of Drama.

== Disappearance and release ==
Adil is believed to have been sentenced to three years in prison or taken to one of the re-education camps throughout Xinjiang. The performer's daughter Adile Adil told RFA's Uyghur Service that he was dismissed from his job and spent over 70 days in hospital for heart surgery. Later their family lost contact with him since 2 November 2018. Adil's disappearance is believed to be linked to a pilgrimage he made two years ago to the Muslim holy city of Mecca without permission from Chinese authorities.

According to his son-in-law's interview, after his release, he is doing his own business.

== See also ==
- List of people who disappeared mysteriously: post-1970
- Sanubar Tursun
- Xinjiang re-education camps
