= Behtiyar Memetimin =

Chinese association football player

Personal information
- Date of birth: 27 August 1998 (age 28)
- Height: 1.73 m (5 ft 8 in)
- Position: Midfielder

Team information
- Current team: Xinjiang Tianshan Leopard
- Number: 28

Senior career*
Years	Team	Apps	(Gls)
2021–2022	Xinjiang Tianshan Leopard	8	(0)
- * Club domestic league appearances and goals as of 14:01, 9 August 2021 (UTC)

Behtiyar Memetimin (Chinese: 拜合提亚尔·买买提依明; born 27 August 1998) is a Chinese footballer who played most recently as a midfielder for Xinjiang Tianshan Leopard.

== Career statistics ==
=== Club ===
As of 17 August 2021.

Club	Season	League			Cup		Other		Total	
Club	Season	Division	Apps	Goals	Apps	Goals	Apps	Goals	Apps	Goals
Xinjiang Tianshan Leopard	2021	China League One	9	0	0	0	0	0	9	0
Career total			9	0	0	0	0	0	9	0
