= Yidiresi Aishan =

Uyghur activist and computer engineer

Yidiresi Aishan (Uyghur: ئىدرىس ھەسەن, Chinese: 伊迪热斯∙艾山) is a Uyghur activist and computer engineer. He had lived in Turkey since 2012, having residency papers and working as a web designer on a Uyghur diaspora online newspaper. Aishan also assisted other activists collecting testimonies and of abuse against Uyghurs in the Chinese Xinjiang autonomous region. After repeated arrests in Turkey, Aishan flew from Istanbul to Casablanca, Morocco, on 19 July 2021.

Upon his arrival at Mohammed V International Airport, Moroccan authorities arrested Aishan in response to an Interpol red notice issued at China's request. Activists said that the arrest was politically driven as part of a broader Chinese campaign to persecute perceived dissidents abroad. The non-governmental organization Safeguard Defenders, asked the Moroccan ambassadors in Washington and Paris and Brussels not to extradite him. Human rights organizations urged Morocco not to extradite Aishan to China; Amnesty International declared that Aishan faced "arbitrary detention and torture" if he was forcibly returned to China, and Joanne Mariner, its Crisis Response Program director, said in a statement that his deportation "would violate international law". The World Uyghur Congress also demanded Moroccan authorities to halt any deportation procedures.

In August 2021, Interpol suspended Aishan's red notice. Its General Secretariat said that "Given that new information has been brought to the attention of the General Secretariat, the red notice previously issued for Yidiresi Aishan has been suspended while a new review is undertaken."

== Personal life ==
Aishan has three children.
