= Lutpulla Mutellip =

Uyghur poet (1922–1945)

- لۇتپۇللا مۇتەللىپ
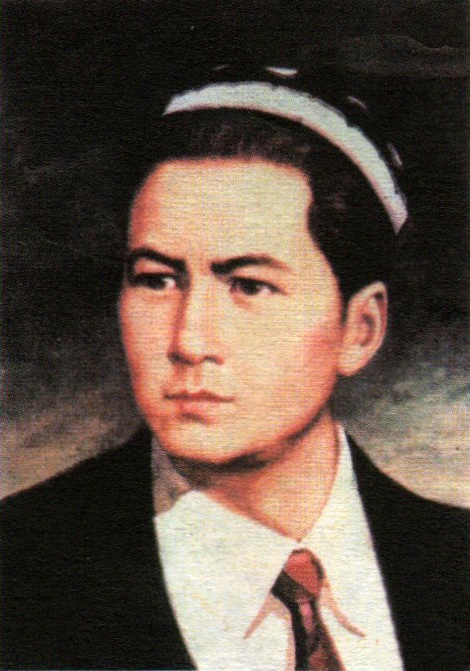
- Artist's rendering of Lutpulla
- Born: November 22, 1922; Nilka, Xinjiang, China
- Died: September 18, 1945 (aged 22); Aksu, Xinjiang, China
- Occupation: Editor
- Writing career
- Language: Uyghur
- Genre: poetry
- Notable works: Yillargha Jawap (Response to Years); Xiyalchan Tilek (Thoughtful Blessing)

Lutpulla Mutellip (Uyghur: لۇتپۇللا مۇتەللىپ; November 22, 1922 – September 18, 1945), also known as Qaynam Orkishi, Lutun, or Li Mutalifu (Chinese:黎·穆塔里甫), was a Uyghur poet and journalist. He is considered one of the most important figures in modern Uyghur literature. Although he died young at the age of 22, he had a strong influence on modern Uyghur literature and especially on Uyghur poetry. His poems are reputed for the beauty of his language. "Response to Years" (Yillargha Jawap) is considered to be his poetic masterpiece and "Thoughtful Blessings" (Xiyalchan Tilek) is another one of his most famous works.

For his work and writing on Uyghur independence, he is remembered by some as a national hero of the Uyghur people.

== Biography ==
He went to a Tatar school in Ghulja for elementary school. Lutpulla moved to Ürümqi after graduating from high school in 1939. He attended college at Ürümqi.

He worked a literature page editor for a gazette. He was exiled to Aksu City in 1943 for his poems because they were seen as criticisms of the Chinese government under Sheng Shicai and was eventually put in prison.

== Execution and burial ==
Lutpulla was executed in 1945 by Nationalist Chinese authorities. He was buried in a graveyard in Aksu City. The graveyard was later destroyed and turned into a park called "Happiness Park". Chinese officials claim to have moved his remains to a "facility", although the exact location of this facility remains unknown as of July 2020.

== Legacy ==
In August 1956, the People's Committee of the Xinjiang Uygur Autonomous Region ratified him as a revolutionary martyr.

Author Abdulla Talip wrote a book in 1982 called Whirlpool Wave that gave a fictionalized account of Mutellip's life.

== Works ==
- Lutpulla Mutallip Ăsărliri, Beijing: Millătlăr Năshriyati, 1981.
- Izbrannye proizvedeniia, Almaty: "Zhazushy", 1975.
