= Zordun Sabir =

Uyghur writer (1937–1998)

- زوردۇن سابىر
- Born: April 1937; Yenitam, Ghulja County, Ili Kazakh Autonomous Prefecture, Xinjiang
- Died: 13 August 1998 (aged 61)
- Citizenship: Chinese
- Education: Yili Normal University
- Occupation: writer
- Writing career
- Language: Uyghur
- Period: 1961-1998
- Notable work: Anayurt (Homeland)

Zordun Sabir (1937 – 13 August 1998; Uyghur: زوردۇن سابىر) was a popular Uyghur author who is most known for his historical "Anayurt" (Homeland) trilogy.

== Books ==
- Awral Shamalliri (The Winds of Avral), 1981
- Izdinish (The Quest), 1983 (two volumes)
- Ata (Father), Urumchi: Shinjang Yashlar-Osmurler Neshriyati, 1994
- Ana Yurt (Motherland), 2000 (three volumes)

== Bibliography ==
- Makhmut Muhămmăt, Qălbimdiki Zordun Sabir: ăslimă, Ürümchi : Shinjang Khălq Năshriyati, (2000)
