= Bilge Kul Qadır Khan =

Historic ruler

Kül Bilge Qadır Khan

Qara Khagan of Karakhanids
- Reign: 840 – 893
- Successor: Bazir Arslan Khan
- Died: 893
- Issue: Oghulcak Khan; Bazir Arslan Khan
- House: Ashina (Disputed)
- Dynasty: Karakhanid
- Religion: Tengrism

Kül Bilge Qadır Khan (Karakhanid: کُلْ بِلْكا قَادِرْ خَانْ) or Bilge Kul Qara Khan was the first known Qara-Khagan (supreme ruler) of the Karakhanids.

== Tribal affinity ==
There are different theories on the tribal identity of Bilge Kul khagan. According to Western and Kazakh historiographies, he was a ruler of Isfijab, a descendant of the Karluk yabghu. Alternatively, he was from the Edgish tribe, a part of the Chigils or a Yagma. According to Pritsak, he claimed the title "Khaqan" after the fall of Uyghur khaganate since he was from the Ashina dynasty. However, Wei Liangtao claims that he was, in fact, Pang Tegin, a ruler of remnants of the Uyghur ruling dynasty in Khotan. Qian Baiquan doubted that.
