= Abdurehim Haji Imin =

Uyghur politician of the PRC (1943–2011)

- Born: March 5, 1943; Kashgar Prefecture, Xinjiang, China
- Died: July 3, 2011 (aged 68); Ürümqi, Xinjiang, China
- Occupations: Politician; accountant

Uyghur name
- Uyghur: ئابدۇرېھىم ھاجىئىمىن
Transcriptions
- Latin Yëziqi: Abdurëhim Haji'imin

Chinese name
- Traditional Chinese: 阿不都熱依木·阿吉依明
- Simplified Chinese: 阿不都热依木‧阿吉依明
Transcriptions
Standard Mandarin
- Hanyu Pinyin: Ābùdōurèyīmù Ājíyīmíng

Alternative Chinese name
- Traditional Chinese: 阿不都熱依木·阿吉伊明
- Simplified Chinese: 阿不都热依木‧阿吉伊明
Transcriptions
Standard Mandarin
- Hanyu Pinyin: Ābùdōurèyīmù Ājíyīmíng

Abdurehim Haji Imin (Note: Uyghur: ئابدۇرېھىم ھاجىئىمىن, romanized: Abdurëhim Haji'imin; Chinese: 阿不都热依木‧阿吉依明 or 阿不都热依木‧阿吉伊明; Ābùdōurèyīmù Ājíyīmíng) (5 March 1943 – 3 July 2011) was a Chinese politician and accountant.

== Biography ==
Abdurehim was born on 5 March 1943 in Kashgar Prefecture, Xinjiang. Of Uyghur ethnicity, he was a native of Xinjiang.

He became a senior account and began working in August 1962 and held several accountancy positions in the Xinjiang Uyghur Autonomous Regional branch of the People's Bank of China.

He served as vice chairman for many of the regional committees in Xinjiang and from 2003 to 2008 was Honorary Chairman of the Xinjiang Federation of Returned Overseas Chinese for the Xinjiang Uyghur Autonomous Region.

He retired in January 2010. He died of illness in Ürümqi on 3 July 2011.
