= Abdurehim Ötkür =

Uyghur poet (1923–1995)

- ئابدۇرېھىم ئۆتكۈر
- Born: 1 May 1923; Kumul, Xinjiang, China
- Died: 5 October 1995 (aged 72); Ürümqi, Xinjiang, China
- Citizenship: Chinese
- Education: Xinjiang University
- Occupations: poet, writer, translator, researcher
- Spouse: Helchem Tileshup
- Children: Zulhayat Ötkür
- Writing career
- Language: Uyghur
- Period: 1940-1995
- Genres: poetry, historical novels

Abdurehim Tileshüp Ötkür (Uyghur: ئابدۇرېھىم ئۆتكۈر, May 1923 – October 1995) was a popular Uyghur author and poet who is considered the "father of modern Uyghur poetry".

== Early life ==
Ötkür was born in Kumul, Xinjiang to a merchant family. His mother died when he was one year old and his father followed when he was four. Before his death, his father Tileş Begim gave Ötkür to his friend Osman Hacı for adoption. Hacı, who didn't have a child of his own, was a prominent resident of Kumul who ensured his adopted son had a good education.

Ötkür's completed his schooling between Gansu, Uqturpan, and Ürümqi, having to move due to the unrest caused by the Kumul Rebellion. He started his studies at a religious school, took lessons from his adopted father's mother-in-law Marihan Hanım, and studied at a gymnasium under Soviet-educated intellectuals in Ürümqi. Hanım told him folk tales, proverbs, and riddles, which would have a great impact on his literary life. At the gymnasium, he read Russian authors like Pushkin and Tolstoy and Turkic writers like Ğabdulla Tuqay. He first started publishing poetry in the school newspaper. He graduated from the Faculty of Pedagogy at Xinjiang University in 1942.

== Career ==
Following graduation, Ötkür worked as a teacher, a school administrator, a journalist, and a newspaper editor. He was the assistant editor-in-chief of the Altay magazine in the late 1940s. He picked up old and new Turkic languages and read of classical Turkic literature and prosody through journals published in nearby Turkic-speaking countries. He also read works in Russian and Arabic and learned Chinese. His fluency in multiple languages let him work as a translator for government offices and publications like Şincan Géziti.

Ötkür was arrested in 1944 and detained for a year for his support of the Three Districts Revolution. Following the incorporation of Xinjiang into the People's Republic of China in 1949, the freedom of poets and writers was restricted. The repressive environment might have prevented him from publishing any poetry books between 1949 and 1968. But other sources state that he might have been imprisoned for long periods in that timespan.

From 1979 to his death, Ötkür worked as a scholar and administrator in the Institute of Literature Studies at the Academy of Philosophy and Social Sciences, Xinjiang. In 1988, was appointed as a Vice Chairman of the Society of Kutadgu Bilig Studies.

== Legacy ==
On March 20, 2019, Harvard president Lawrence Bacow recited a stanza of Ötkür's poetry during his speech promoting the values of free speech and academic freedom at Peking University, one of China's top universities. His recitation of Ötkür's poetry was significant given the Chinese government's repression of Uyghurs.

== Works ==
Ötkür first published his poems in 1940. The poems "Tarim Boyliri" (Along Tarim) and "Yürek Mungliri" (Melodies of the heart) were very popular. His last novels, "Iz" (The Track) and "Oyghanghan Zimin" (The Awakened Land), became some of the most popular novels among Uyghur people for their social and historical significance. His novel "Iz" was condensed into a poem of the same name.

- Qeshqer Kéchisi, Ürümchi: Xinjiang People's Press, 1980.
- Iz (novel) Ürümchi: Xinjiang People's Press, 1985.
- Ömür Menzilliri, Ürümchi: Xinjiang Youths Press, 1985.
- Oyghanghan Zimin (novel trilogy)

== Poetry ==
Uchrashqanda (The Encounter)

Uyghur language:

Didim nichün qorqmassen? Didi tengrim bar,
Didim yene chu? Didi xelqim bar,
Didim yene yoqmu? Didi rohim bar,
Didim shükranmusen? U didi yaq yaq.

Translation:

I ask, why are you not afraid? She says, I have my God,
I ask, what else? She says, I have my people,
I ask, what more? She says, I have my soul,
I ask, are you content? She says, I am not.

The song "Uchrashqanda (The Encounter)" was later sung by famous Uyghur dutar player and folk singer Abdurehim Heyit.
