= Oghulchak Khan =

Qara Khagan of Karakhanids
- Reign: 920-942
- Predecessor: Bazir Arslan Khan
- Successor: Satuk Bughra Qara Khagan
- Died: 942
- Spouse: Gokshin Khatun
Regnal name
- Oghulchak Arslan Qadır Tabgach Qara-Khagan
- House: Karakhanid dynasty
- Father: Bilge Kul Qadir Khan
- Religion: Tengriism

Oghulchak Arslan Khan was the third and last Karakhanid Khagan to follow the native Turkic religion of Tengrism. He was a Bughra Khagan during his elder brother Bazir Arslan's rule in the west. He was titled Arslan Khagan after his ascension to the throne.

== Reign ==
He may have clashed with the Samanid emir Ismail in Talas, 893. After withdrawing to Kashgar, he welcomed the influx of Muslim traders to the city, even allowing them to build a mosque in the town of Artux just outside Kashgar. Growing Muslim presence led to the secret conversion of his nephew, Satuq Bughra Khan. When Oghulchak heard that Satuq had become a Muslim, he demanded that Satuq build a Tengriist temple to show that he hadn't converted. Nasr, the Persian merchant who converted Satuq to Islam, advised him that he should pretend to build a temple but with the intention of building a mosque in his heart. The khagan, after seeing Satuq starting to build the temple, stopped him, believing that he had not converted. Afterwards, Satuq obtained a fatwa which permitted him in effect to kill his uncle, after which he conquered Kashgar.
