= Bazir Arslan Khan =

Khagan of the Kara-Khanid Khaganate (893 and 920 CE)

Khagan of Karakhanids
- Reign: 893-920
- Predecessor: Bilge Kul Qadir Khan
- Successor: Oghulcak Khan
- Issue: Sultan Satuq Bughra Khan
- House: Karakhanid dynasty
- Father: Bilge Kul Qadir Khan
- Religion: Tengrism

Bazir Arslan Khan or Bazir (巴兹尔) was khagan of the Kara-Khanid Khaganate between 893 and 920 CE. Nothing much is known about his reign, or the surrounding time period in the region. According to Wei Liangtao, he was Arslan (elder) khaqan and the father of Satuq Bughra Khan, who killed the Bughra (lesser) khaqan Oghulchak Khan.
