= Ismail Semed =

Uyghur activist

Ismail Semed was an Uighur activist executed by China for possession of illegal firearms and explosives. He was accused of "attempting to split the motherland".

A Chinese court found Semed guilty of possession of illegal firearms and explosives and separatism for involvement in the East Turkestan Islamic Movement, which is considered a terrorist group by China and other countries including the United States. He was executed by firing squad on 8 February 2007 in Urumqi.

Human rights group said the evidence was insufficient. Nicholas Bequelin, Hong Kong-based China researcher of Human Rights Watch, said:

"The death penalty was widely disproportionate to the alleged crimes ... his trial did not meet minimum requirements of fairness and due process."
