= Sultan Satuq Bughra Khan =

Kara-Khanid ruler

Satuq Bughra Khan
- Ghazi; Hazrat; Sultan

Khagan of Karakhanids
- Reign: 942–955
- Predecessor: Oghulchak Khan
- Successor: Musa Baytash Khan
- Born: Winter, 920 (or 914) CE
- Died: 344 AH (955/956 CE); Artush, Kara-Khanid Khanate
- Burial: Kashgar
- House: Karakhanids
- Father: Bazir Arslan Khan
- Religion: Tengrism (before conversion); Islam (after conversion)

Abdulkarim Satuq Bughra Khan (Uyghur: سۇلتان سۇتۇق بۇغراخان; also spelled Satuk; died 955) was a Kara-Khanid khan; he was one of the first Turkic rulers to convert to Islam, which prompted his Kara-Khanid subjects to convert.

There are different historical accounts of the Satuq's life with some variations. Sources include Mulhaqāt al-Surāh (Supplement to the "Surah") by Jamal Qarshi (b. 1230/31) who quoted an earlier 11th-century text, Tarikh-i Kashghar (History of Kashgar) by Abū-al-Futūh 'Abd al-Ghāfir ibn al-Husayn al-Alma'i, an account by an Ottoman historian, known as the Munajjimbashi, and a fragment of a manuscript in Chagatai, Tazkirah Bughra Khan (Memory of Bughra Khan).

== Origin ==
Satuq was said to have come from Artush, identified in the 10th century book Hudud al-'alam (The Limits of the World) as a "populous village of the Yaghma", the Yaghma being one of the Turkic tribes that formed the Karakhanids. He lost his father Bazir Arslan Khan when he was 6. His uncle, Oghulchak Khan, married his mother in levirate marriage, making Satuq his step-son.

== Conversion to Islam ==
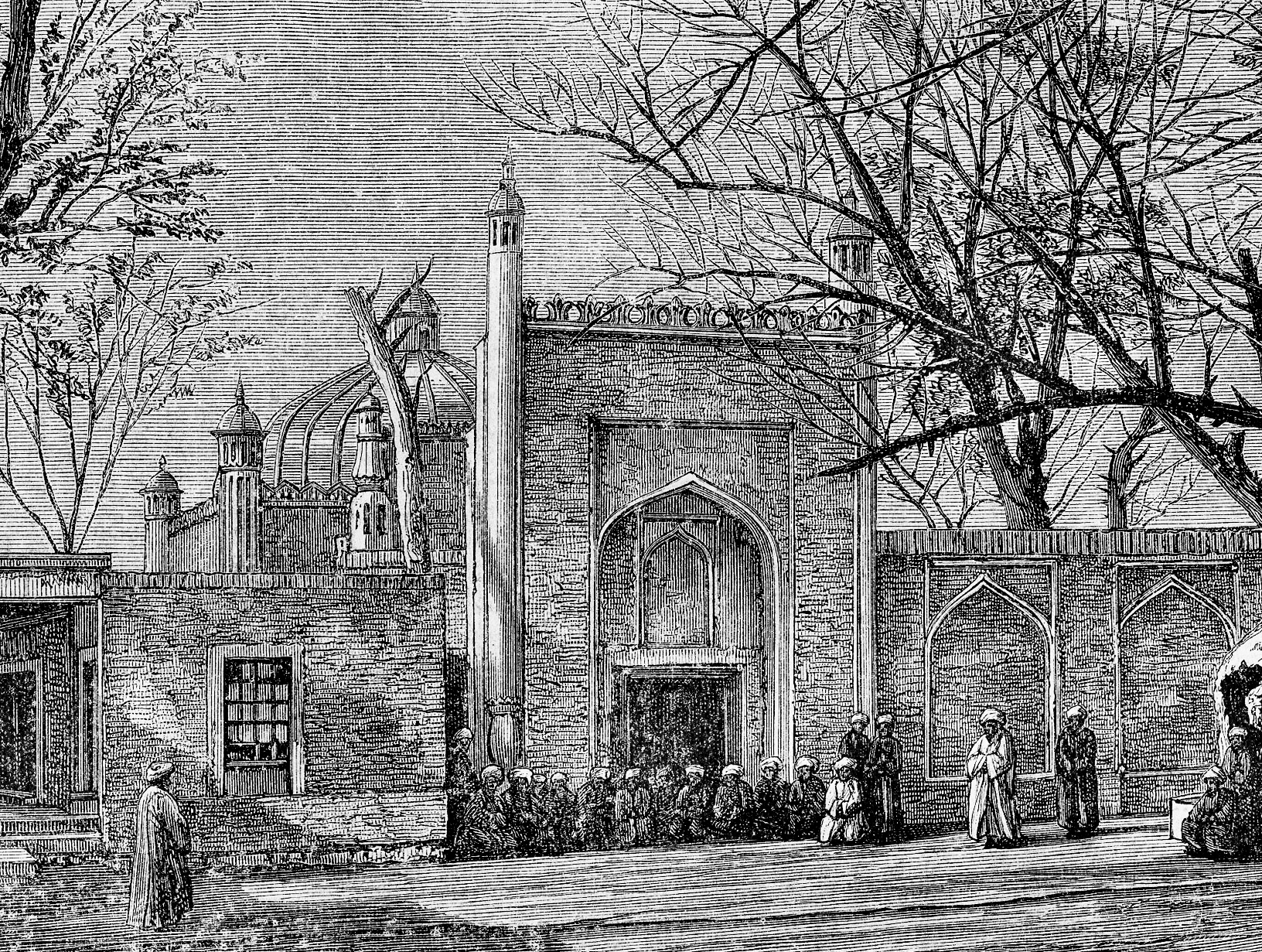
1884 depiction of Sultan Satuq Bughra Khan's tomb in Artush, by Hercule Louis Catenacci

According to an account by Munajjimbashi, based on a tradition ultimately stemming from a Karakhanid emissary in 1105 to the Abbasid court, he was the first of the khans to convert to Islam under the influence of a faqīh from Bukhara. According to the Tazkirah Bughra Khan and Jamal Qarshi's Mulhaqat al-surah, Satuq converted to Islam when he was twelve. He was taught about Islam by a Samanid merchant, Abu an-Nasr from Bukhara. Nasr befriended the Khan of Kashgar, Satuq's step-father and uncle Oghulchak Khan and was granted special dispensation to build a mosque in the town of Artush just outside Kashgar. Here Satuq would often come to watch the caravans arrive. When Satuq saw Nasr and other Muslims observing their daily prayers he became curious and was instructed by them in the Islamic religion.

Satuq kept his faith secret from the king, but convinced his friends to convert. However, when the king heard that Satuq had become a Muslim, he demanded that (under advice of Satuq's mother) Satuq build a temple to show that he hadn't converted. Nasr advised Satuq that he should pretend to build a temple but with the intention of building a mosque in his heart. The king, after seeing Satuq starting to build the temple, then stopped him, believing that he had not converted. Afterwards, Satuq obtained a fatwa which permitted him in effect to commit patricide, and killed his step-father, after which he conquered Kashgar.

The exact year of Satuq's conversion is contested. Some authors put the date at 934, with some appeals to "tradition." However, others put the date closer to 940-945.

== Religious wars ==
Satuq was variously stated as twelve and a half or twenty-five when he became khan, and he began to wage religious war against non-Muslims. According to Tazkirah Bughra Khan:

As far as the River Amu that is before Balkh on this side towards sun-rising as far as the place called 'Karak' on the north as far as the place called 'Qarà-qurdum' (the said) Sultan, having converted the infidels to Islam by his sword, established the laws and religion of the Holy Muhammad, the Messenger of God, and gave them currency.

== Death ==
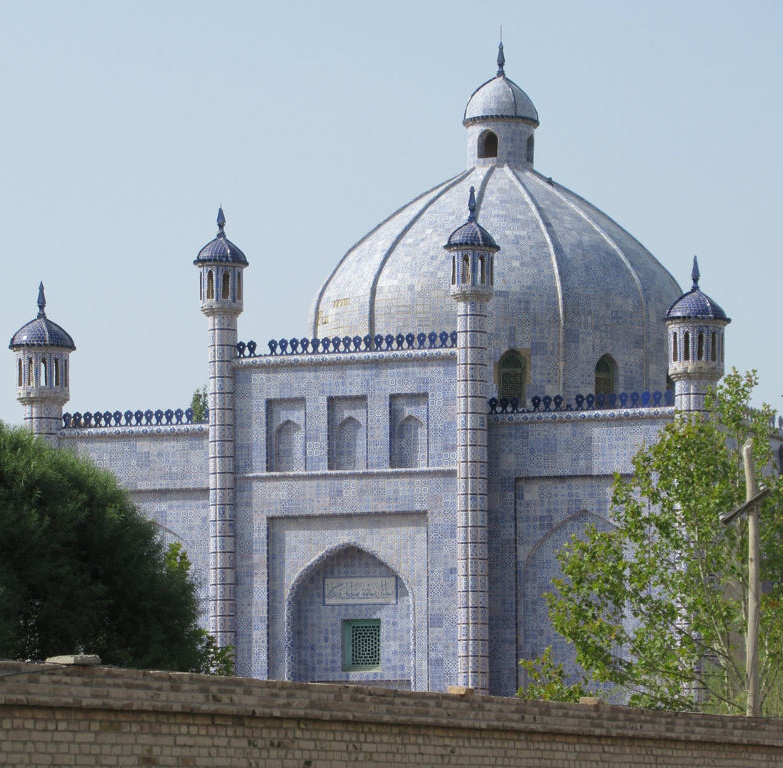
Tomb of Sultan Satuq Bughra Khan in 2017

Satuq Bughra Khan died in 955–956 according to Jamal Qarshi, and was buried in a mazar that can still be visited in Artush today. It was restored in 1995 by Uyghur architect Abuduryim Ashan.

== Family ==
He had at least 4 sons and 3 daughters:

- Musa Baytash Khan
- Suleyman Khan
- Hasan Bughra
- Husayn Bughra
- Nasab Tarkan
- Hadya Tarkan
- Ala Nur

== See also ==
- List of converts to Islam
