= Zulfiya Abdiqadir =

Chinese politician

- زولفيا عبدالقادر 祖丽菲娅·阿不都卡德尔

Head of the Transport Department of Xinjiang Uyghur Autonomous Region
- Incumbent
- Assumed office 24 July 2015
- Preceded by: Nijat Sultan

Bureau Chief of the Xinjiang Uyghur Autonomous Region Regional Road Transportation Administrative Bureau
- In office August 2008 – 14 July 2015
- Preceded by: Erkin Abdurëhim
- Succeeded by: Ilham Ablet

Personal details
- Born: May 1966 (age 59) Yining (Ghulja), Xinjiang, China
- Party: Chinese Communist Party
- Education: Xinjiang Eighteen Agricultural Institute; Chinese Communist Party School of Xinjiang

Zulfiya Abdiqadir (born May 1966) is a Uyghur civil servant in the People's Republic of China.

== Education ==
Zulfiya completed her undergraduate degree at what is now the Xinjiang Agricultural University in Ürümqi. She completed her master's at the Chinese Communist Party School of Xinjiang.

== Career ==
In 1984, Zulfiya joined the science and technology branch of the Xinjiang Uyghur Autonomous Region Regional Road Transportation Administrative Bureau. Over the next 18 years, she worked in other branches of the department, including vehicle management, project management, and safety regulations. In 2002, Zulfiya was appointed the bureau's chief economic engineer.

Zulfiya became a member of the bureau's CCP Committee in 2004. In 2007, she was appointed deputy bureau chief and put in charge of administrative affairs. Less than one year later, Zulfiya became Deputy Committee Secretary of the bureau's CCP Committee, as well as bureau chief.

She served as a representative for Xinjiang at the 11th National People's Congress from 2008 to 2013.

In 2015, Zulfiya was appointed to head of the Transport Department of Xinjiang Uyghur Autonomous Region and became the deputy secretary of the department's CCP Committee.
