= Abdulla Abdurehim =

Abdulla Abdurëhim
- Also known as: King of Uyghur pop
- Occupations: Actor, singer
- Years active: 1992–present

Abdulla Abdurëhim (Uyghur: ئابدۇللا ئابدۇرېھىم, Chinese: 阿不都拉) is a Uyghur actor and singer known for Uyghur pop music. He also currently serves as a judge on the reality talent show The Voice of the Silk Road.

Known as the "King of Uyghur Pop", Abdulla's musical career and popularity has endured to the present day, with his work ranging from love songs and ballads to political and social commentary.

Abdulla's cousin is Möminjan Ablikim, another prominent Uyghur musician.

== See also ==
- Ablajan Awut Ayup
- Erkin Abdulla
