= Abdurehim Heyit =

Uyghur folk singer (born 1962)

- ئابدۇرېھىم ھېيىت
- Born: 1 June 1962 (age 64); Kashgar, Xinjiang, China
- Education: Kashgar School of Art (Graduated in 1986)
- Occupation: Musician
- Employer(s): China National Ethnic Song and Dance Ensemble; Xinjiang Uyghur Autonomous Region Song and Dance Ensemble

Abdurehim Heyit (Uyghur: ئابدۇرېھىم ھېيىت; born 1962) is an Uyghur folk singer‌ and composer. The Uyghur people are a Turkic language-speaking group and a spokesman for the Turkish foreign ministry described Abdurehim as a "distinguished poet".

In February 2019, Turkish government sources reported that he had died in custody in China, but this claim was contradicted by Chinese sources. This incident led to a short term crisis in the Chinese-Turkish relations. In July 2019 Chinese government confirmed he was under arrest but "in good health", and shortly afterward he was interviewed by Turkish journalists in Urumçi.

== Biography ==
Abdurehim was renowned for his performances on the dutar, a two-stringed traditional instrument. He studied music in Beijing and performed with national arts troupes in China. In March 2017, he was arrested and imprisoned, reportedly after performing a song, "Fathers", based on a traditional Uyghur poem calling on younger generations to respect the sacrifices of their forefathers and containing a reference to the "martyrs of war". He was reportedly serving an eight-year sentence.

== Reported death ==
It was reported, initially by Turkish media, that he died in custody in Ürümqi on 9 February 2019, after being tortured. He was reportedly being held in a detention camp on an eight-year sentence. His death was not officially confirmed, but the reports led to the Turkish Ministry of Foreign Affairs objecting to the treatment of ethnic Uyghurs in the Xinjiang province of China, describing them as "great shame for humanity" and noting the "systematic assimilation policy of Chinese authorities against the Uighur Turks is a great embarrassment for humanity". This incident led to a short term crisis in the Chinese-Turkish relations, and China has responded that Turkey's comments are "completely unacceptable". With the exception of Turkey's statement, there has been little public condemnation from Muslim majority countries; analysts believe their complacency may be due to a fear of economic and political consequences.

On 10 February, Chinese state media released a video claiming to show Abdurehim on that day, with the man shown stating that he was in "good health" and that he was "in the process of being investigated for allegedly violating national laws". The US-based NED-funded Uyghur Human Rights Project questioned the authenticity of the video, which has been labelled as "unverified" by international press. Magnus Fiskesjo, Associate Professor of Anthropology and Asian Studies at Cornell University, stated that the recording appeared to be scripted and showed similar signs to confessions in which the subjects had been threatened or tortured.

== Release and second disappearance ==
On July 25, 2019, journalist Gökhan Karakaş from Milliyet found Abdurehim Heyit in Urumqi and interviewed him with the permission of Chinese Communist Party official Zhang Zhisheng. On the same day, Turkish newspaper Aydınlık interviewed him in his house in the capital city.

As of November 2019, World Uyghur Congress reported that he had been released and was under house arrest, but "his whereabouts remain unknown."

Joanne Smith Finley reported that Abdurehim Heyit was released after the international outrage over rumors of his death in detention, and (as of June 2021) has since been under house arrest.

== See also ==
- List of people who disappeared mysteriously (2000–present)
