= Erkin Abdulla =

Erkin Abdulla ئەركىن ئابدۇللا
- Also known as: Son of the Silk Road, Prince of Guitar, Prince of Love Songs
- Born: ئەركىن ئابدۇللا; July 8, 1978 (age 47)
- Origin: Xinjiang, China
- Occupations: Singer, songwriter
- Instruments: Guitar, voice
- Years active: 2002–present
- Labels: Beijing Compass Culture Co., Jingwen Records
- Website: ErkinAbdulla.com

Erkin Abdulla

Chinese name
- Traditional Chinese: 艾爾肯·阿布都拉
- Simplified Chinese: 艾尔肯·阿布都拉
Transcriptions
Standard Mandarin
- Hanyu Pinyin: Eiěrkěn Ābùdùlā
- Gwoyeu Romatzyh: ayeelkeen abuhduhlha
- Wade–Giles: ai4erh3k`en3 a1pu4tu4la1
- Tongyong Pinyin: ai4er3ken3 a1bu4du4la1
- Yale Romanization: ai4er3ken3 a1bu4du4la1
- MPS2: ai4er3ken3 a1bu4du4la1
- IPA: [âɪ.àɚ.kʰə̀n.á.pû.tû.lá]

Uyghur name
- Uyghur: ئەركىن ئابدۇللا
Transcriptions
- Latin Yëziqi: Erkin 'Abdulla
- Yengi Yeziⱪ: Ərkin 'Abdulla
- Siril Yëziqi: Əркин 'Абдулла

Erkin Abdulla (Uyghur: ئەركىن ئابدۇللا; simplified Chinese: 艾尔肯·阿布都拉; traditional Chinese: 艾爾肯·阿布都拉; pinyin: Aiěrkěn Ābùdùlā; born July 8, 1978) is an Uyghur musician. His musical style bridges contemporary folk, Uyghur pop and flamenco.

== Biography ==
Abdulla was born in Qopan, a small village in Kargilik County, Kashgar, Xinjiang Uyghur Autonomous Region, China, on July 8, 1978. He started studying guitar when he was twelve. In 1997, he went to Beijing to go to university and started his music career. Graduated from the Minzu University of China, Central Conservatory of Music and Los Angeles Musicians Institute. Erkin Abdulla is a Uyghur musician, music style is Contemporary Folk, Uyghur pop and Flamenco. With his unique voice and superb guitar skills, his music has various elements. Erkin combined Uyghur folk and modern music styles to create a cross-cultural and borderless global music style. In 2002, he released his first album "Caravan", was awarded "Best Musical Album" and "Best Adapted Folk Music" of the Nanning International Folk Song Art Festival. In 2003, won The Pop Musician Golden Medal at the Chinese National Vocal Competition. His original song "Uyghur girl" won the Nanning International Folk Song Art Festival's "Ten Golden Melody Awards". Another original song "Can't Live Without You" won "Best Music Award" at the Asia Music Festival which was held in Shanghai, China. In 2004, released second album "One Thousand and One Nights". He held a live concert tour in Xinjiang Uyghur Autonomous Region and became the symbolic figure of Kashgar City. In 2005, released third album "Night of the City", He won the 2005–2007 Chinese annual Golden Record "Rock Class Musicians' Award". In 2006, released fourth album "The Story of Dungköwruk". His original song "What's Up" won the "Best Original Music Award" in Xinjiang Uyghur Autonomous Region's Kurban Eid festival concert. In 2007, he released his fifth album "Blog", and his original song "Kashgar" won the "Golden Medal Award" in the Xinjiang Uyghur Autonomous Region Network MV Contest. In 2008, Erkin released his sixth album "The Thousand Caves". He became the music director for the Children's Art Group's album "Colorful Kashgar". For his songs "Mother" and "Helpless" he won the Xinjiang Uyghur Autonomous Region Original Pop Music Contest "Golden Melody Award". In 2012, he held his personal concert at Baoli Theater in Beijing, China. In 2013, he released his seventh album "Trace". In 2014, he became a judge for the TV show "Voice of the Silk Road". In 2014, he moved to the United States to start his global music career. As a Uyghur musician, Erkin Abdulla has been focusing on the development of the Uyghur ethnic traditional music heritage. He has fully learned the ancient Uyghur Muqam – Dolan's artistic essence, created many songs with Uyghur ancient and modern elements, like "The Eagle of Tengri Tagh", "The Thousand Caves" the best modern Uyghur music. Also, he consolidated, produced, performed and did the adaptations for the Pamir ethnic folk rhythms which are becoming extinct in recent years. He always dedicates his music works to enrich the Uyghur ethnic culture and make the music world more colorful.

== Music style ==
Erkin Abdulla writes in the styles of contemporary folk, Uyghur pop and flamenco, and both sings and plays guitar. Abdulla combines Uyghur folk and modern music styles to create a cross-cultural and borderless global music style. Abdulla focuses on the development of the Uyghur ethnic traditional music heritage. He has fully learned the ancient Uyghur Muqam and has created many songs with both ancient and modern Uyghur elements, such as "The Eagle of Tengri Tagh", "The Thousand Caves". He also consolidated, produced, and performed the adaptations for the Pamir ethnic folk rhythms, which are in danger of extinction. Abdulla states that he always dedicates his music works to enrich the Uyghur ethnic culture and desires to make the music world more colorful.

== Personal life ==
Erkin Abdulla is married and the father of three children, two boys and a girl. The eldest child, a boy, is named Ilker Erkin; the second child, also a boy, is named Ilter Erkin and the youngest child, a girl, is named Zilale Erkin.

== Discography ==
=== Studio albums ===
- Dolan Out of the Desert (Uyghur: Karwan Yoli; Chinese: 走出沙漠的刀郎; pinyin: Zǒuchū shāmò de dāoláng) (August 7, 2002)
- 1,001 Nights / Arabian Nights (Uyghur: Bir Ming Kéche; Chinese: 一千零一夜; pinyin: Yīqiān Líng Yī Yè) (March 9, 2003)
- City Night (Uyghur: Sheher Kéchisi; Chinese: 城市之夜; pinyin: Chéngshì Zhī Yè) (June 2005)
- Grand Bazaar Story / Döngköwrük's Story (Chinese: 二道桥的故事; pinyin: Èr Dào Qiáo De Gùshì) (Mat 2006)
- Blog (Uyghur: Blog; Chinese: 博客; pinyin: Bókè) (2007)
- Thousand Buddha Caves (Uyghur: Ming Öy; Chinese: 千佛洞; pinyin: Qiān Fú Dòng) (2008)
- Footprint (Chinese: 足迹; pinyin: Zújì) (2013)

=== Video CDs ===
- Arken: Guitar Prince (April 2004)
- City Night (Uyghur: Sheher Kéchisi; Chinese: 城市之夜; pinyin: Chéngshì Zhī Yè) (June 2005)

== Awards ==
- At the end of 2002, at Nanning's "International Folk Music Art Festival", Erkin Abdulla won Best Individual Album Awards for his first album (The Dolan Out of the Desert).
- October 2003: Erkin Abdulla won a first prize in the area of Popular Music from the Ministry of Culture of the People's Republic of China at the 2003 National Vocal Music Competition.
- November 2003: Erkin Abdulla's work "Uyghur Girl" was ranked among the Best Ten Golden Hits Award.
- November 2003: Erkin Abdulla's work "Men öley" won the Best New Artist's WorkAward at the 6th Annual Shanghai Zhenmei Cup Asian Music Festival.
- November 2003: Erkin Abdulla won the Silver Award at the "Asia New Singer Competition" at the 6th Annual Shanghai Zhenmei Cup Asian Music Festival.
- 2005–2007: Erkin Abdulla was awarded Golden Disc Awards for his music.

== See also ==
- Ablajan Awut Ayup
- Murat Nasyrov
