= Xinjiang Arts Institute =

Arts university in Ürümqi, Xinjiang Uyghur Autonomous Region, China

Xinjiang Arts Institute 新疆艺术学院
- Type: Public
- Established: September 23, 1958; 68 years ago
- Location: Ürümqi, Xinjiang, China
- Campus: Urban
- Website: www.xjart.edu.cn

Xinjiang Arts Institute (Chinese: 新疆艺术学院; pinyin: Xīnjiāng Yìshù Xuéyuàn) is an arts college in Xinjiang. It is ranked at 521st in China, having a score of 15.00.

== 50th anniversary ==
On September 26, 2008, Xinjiang Arts Institute held a conference to celebrate its 50th anniversary of establishment at Xinjiang People's Hall. Ismail Tiliwaldi, vice chairman of the Standing Committee of the National People's Congress; Nur Bekri, deputy secretary of CPC Xinjiang Committee, chairman of Xinjiang Uygur Autonomous Region attended the celebration with university staff and students.
