= Imperial Commissioner (China) =

Former officer of imperial China, ranking below the Emperor

Imperial Commissioner of the Ming dynasty and Qing dynasty
- ᡥᡝᠰᡝ ᡳ ᠲᠠᡣᡡᠷᠠᡥᠠ ᠠᠮᠪᠠᠨ
- Qing dynasty Flag

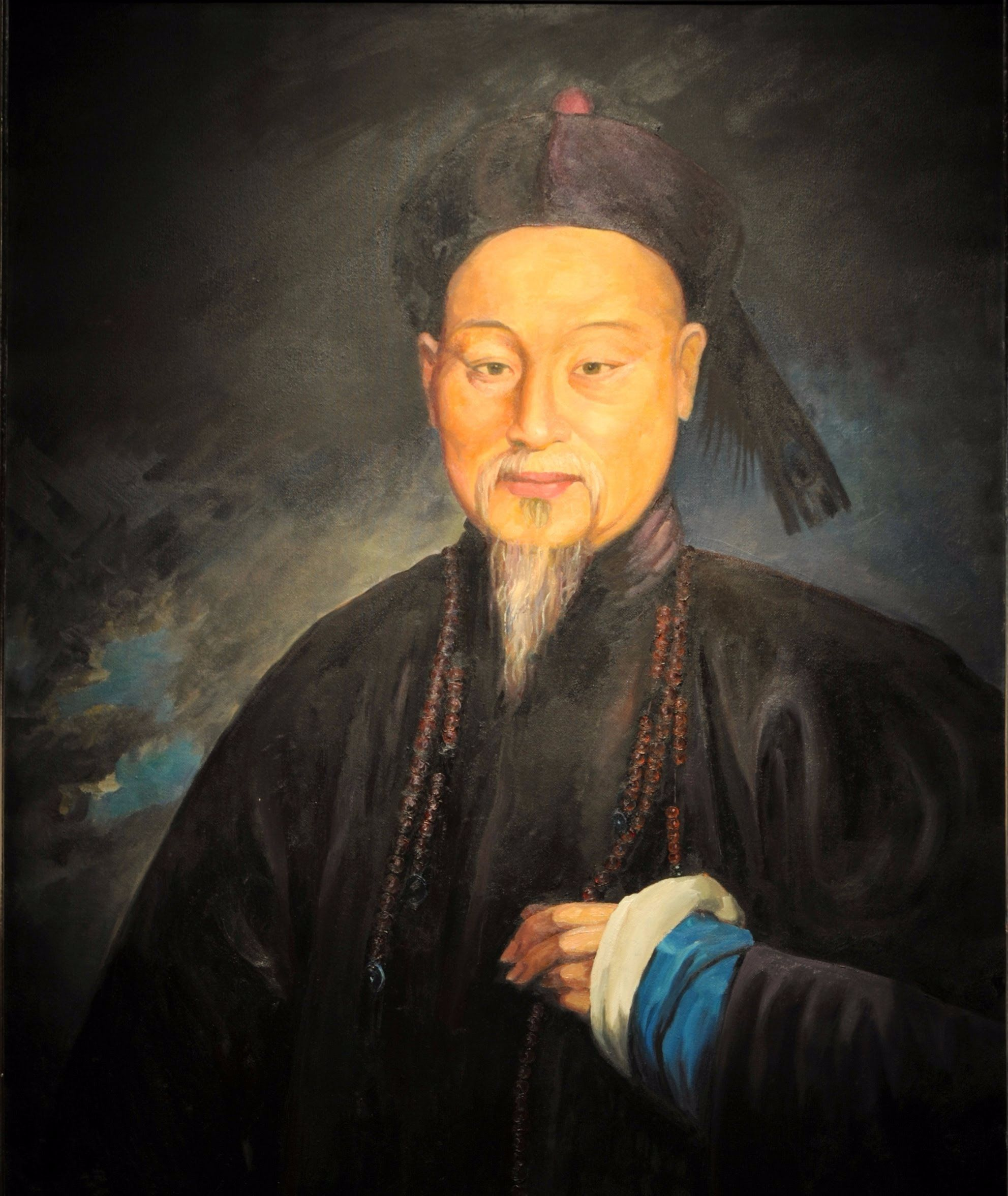
- Lin Zexu, the first Imperial Commissioner for the Qing, burnt over 1,200 tons of opium at Humen in 1838
- Style: Governor
- Status: Head of state; Head of government
- Residence: Guangzhou, Guangdong
- Term length: No fixed term
- Formation: 1555–1640 (Ming dynasty); 1838–1912 (Qing dynasty)
- First holder: Tan Lun (Ming dynasty); Lin Zexu (Qing dynasty)
- Final holder: Hong Chengchou (Ming dynasty); Yuan Shikai (Qing dynasty)

The Imperial Commissioner (Chinese: 欽差大臣; Pinyin: Qīnchāi Dàchén; Manchu: ᡥᡝᠰᡝ ᡳ<ᠲᠠᡣᡡᠷᠠᡥᠠᠠᠮᠪᠠᠨ) was a high-ranking position in the Qing government and Ming government of the late Qing and Ming dynasties of China. The position itself is the highest rank in both governments, only below the position of Emperor. The position's officeholder is also appointed directly by the emperor. The position initially originated from the Han dynasty, but modernised into the modern Imperial Commissioner in the later Ming dynasty.

== History ==
=== Origins ===
The concept of an Imperial Commissioner dates back to the Han dynasty, when the Emperor of the Han often dispatched Special Commissioners (特使, Tèshǐ) for diplomatic missions, with an example being Zhang Qian's expedition to Central Asia, crossing regions in Xinjiang, Afghanistan, and Uzbekistan. Starting from the Sui dynasty, investigating censors were also deployed, and they were similar to the Imperial Commissioner in some aspects. However, the Investigating Censors remained mainly limited responsibility-wise, as they were only used for provincial supervision and issuing governmental reports back to the emperor. In the Tang dynasty, the system's structure improved, as they began using Commissioners with Extraordinary Powers (採訪使, Cǎifǎngshǐ and later 觀察使, Guāncháshǐ) to govern and administrate regions, and engage in border patrol. They also helped with overseeing regional military campaign, and sometimes were appointed military supervisors or military commanders after retiring or leaving the role of Commissioner with Extraordinary Powers. In the Song dynasty, the Song Emperors maintained a relatively similar system to that of the Tang dynasty, but employed the principle of temporary commissioners. Temporary commissioners usually maintained order throughout the country, utilising their position to suppress rebellion and the rise of warlordism.

In the Ming dynasty, posterior to the collapse of the Yuan dynasty, the Ming emperors utilised Grand Coordinators (巡撫, Xúnfǔ) and Supreme Commanders (總督, Zǒngdū). Unlike Imperial Commissioners, these posts evolved into de facto provincial officials. The Imperial Commissioner was founded in 1555, following the Wokou (Japanese pirates) invasion into the Ming dynasty from Japan. However, the position of Imperial Commissioner remained intermittent and infrequently used, only prominent during eras of external or internal instability.

==== Evolvement of Imperial Commissioner in the Qing ====
In the early Qing dynasty, during the reigns of the Shunzhi Emperor and the Kangxi Emperor in the 17th century and early 18th century, the role of Imperial Commissioner disappeared, and was used as a more flexible role of top governance instead of the established Imperial Commissioner used in the 19th and 20th centuries. The Imperial Commissioner was instead only named as a commissioner, and consisted mostly of Manchu princes and residents of the Manchu Eight Banners. These commissioners were dispatched to oversee military campaigns in southern Han coastal provinces like Guangdong, Guangxi, Fujian, and Zhejiang, and manage relations with Mongolia to increase Manchu-Mongol intermarriage and prepare for the Qing annexation of Outer Mongolia, which would occur in 1691 during Kangxi rule.

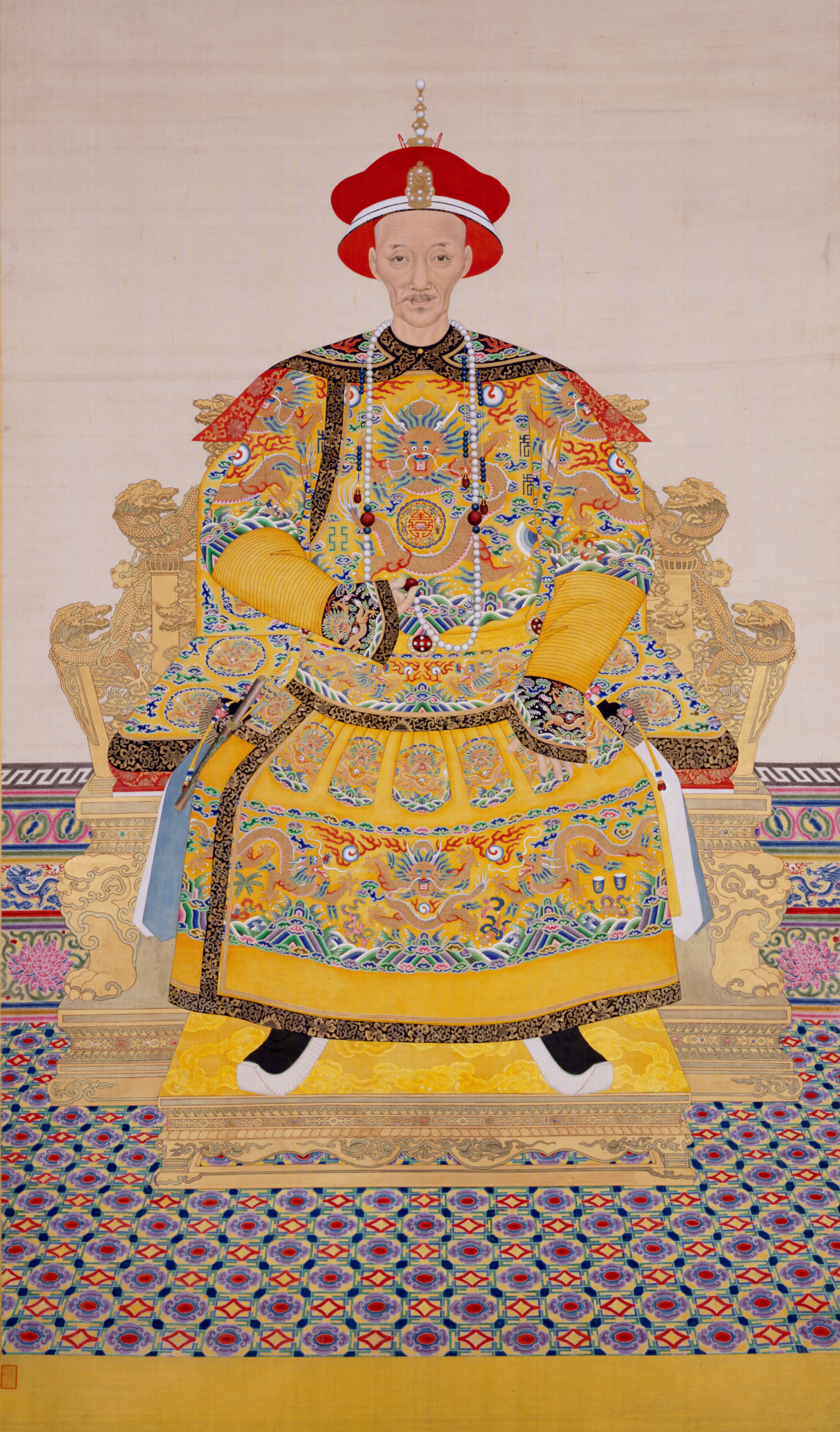
The Jiajing Emperor (left), who founded the position of Imperial Commissioner in 1555 for the Ming dynasty, and the Daoguang Emperor (right), who founded the position of Imperial Commissioner in 1838 for the Qing dynasty

During the reign of the Qianlong Emperor in the 18th century, the position shifted in becoming a position used for crisis management in the Qing, and was used to suppress rebellions that were present during the Ten Great Campaigns launched by the Qianlong Emperor. These rebellions included the White Lotus Rebellion and the Jinchuan campaigns. The commissioners were also used for negotiations with foreign countries like the British Empire like during the 1793 British Macartney Diplomatic Mission. The Qianlong Emperor maintained tight control, expecting detailed memorials and often setting strict limits on their mandate. The commissioners also retained some of their older responsibilities during the early eras of the Qing, like commanding the Qing campaign in the Dzungar Khanate and negotiating new borders with the Russian Empire concerning the invasion. During the reigns of the Jiaqing Emperor and early Daoguang Emperor, as administrative corruption and social unrest grew, the commissioner was increasingly used for internal investigation and reform, until it was shaped into the Imperial Commissioner in 1838 during Daoguang reign.

=== Ming dynasty ===
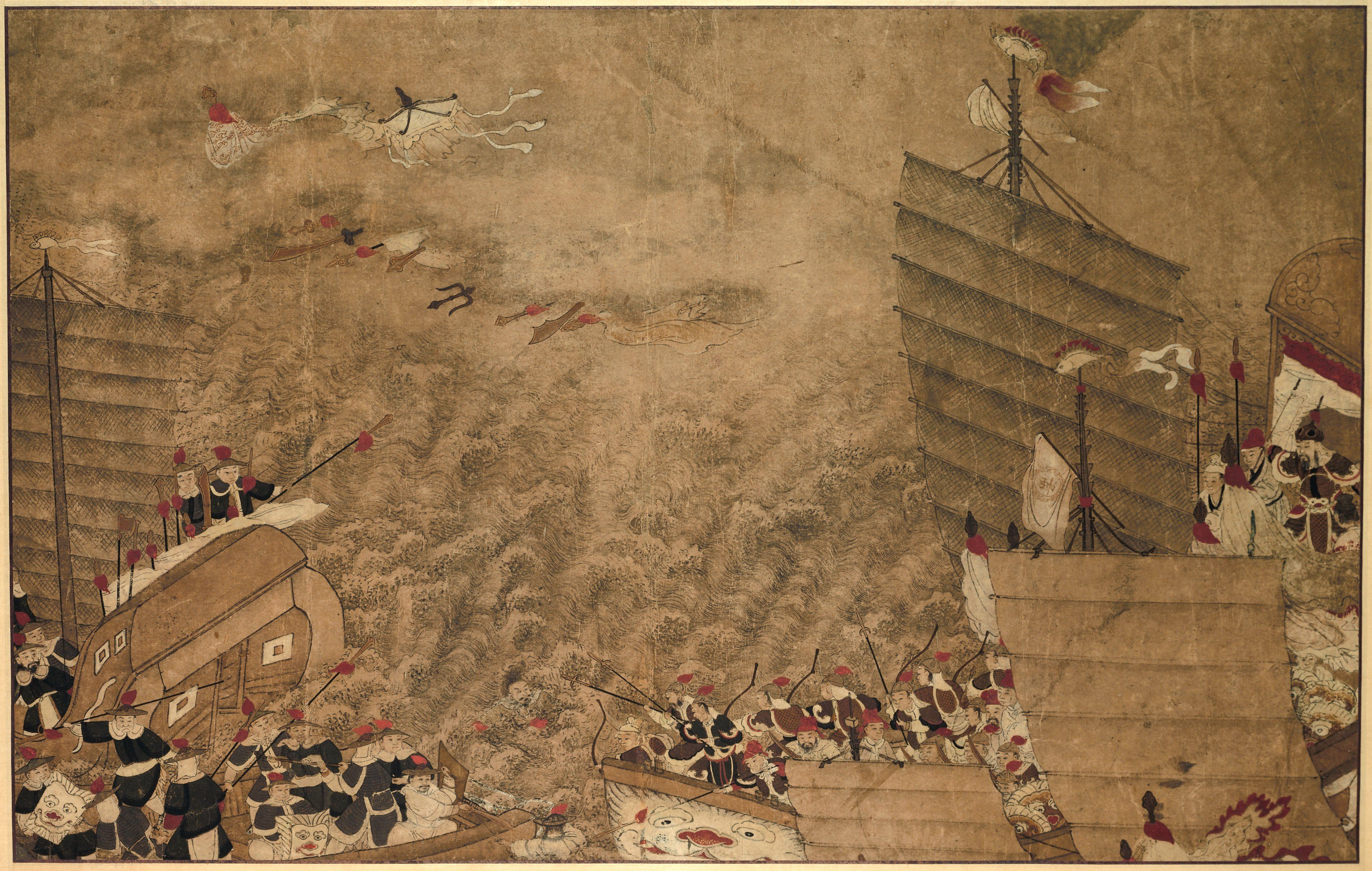
An 18th-century Chinese painting depicting a naval battle between wokou pirates and the Chinese

During the rule of the Jiajing Emperor in the 16th century, the Ming dynasty was suffering from a Wokou crisis. The Wokou were Japanese pirate fleets consisting of Japanese ronin and Chinese smugglers, and they had been attacking Korea and China since the 13th century, often invading provinces like Zhejiang, Fujian, and Jiangnan, defeating Ming dynasty Military Garrisons with concerning ease, as the military personnel (weisuo), were ineffective and corrupt. In 1555, a force of around 70 wokou marched from the coast of the Ming all the way to the outskirts of Nanjing, showcasing the Ming's lack of discipline in their military. In response, the Jiajing Emperor appointed Tan Lun, a Ming official known for his military acumen, as Imperial Commissioner, Xunfu (巡抚) and later Zongdu (总督) with plenipotentiary powers to manage the issue. In 1555, he arrived on the coast, and held concurrent responsibilities from 1555 to 1556 of Right Vice Censor-in-Chief (右副都御史), Superintendent of Fujian and Zhejiang, and military commissioner. During his post, the Jiajing Emperor issued him a mandate: "unify coastal defenses, recruit and train effective troops, and expel the wokou. You have the authority to levy funds, appoint and dismiss officers, and execute military law." During his appointment, he also cooperated with military generals Qi Jiguang and Yu Dayou. The three famously utilised Qi Jiguang's tactic of recruiting miners and farmers from Zhejiang to form the legendary "Qi Family Army" (戚家军), trained in innovative "mandarin duck" infantry tactics to counter pirate swordsmen and samurai. To prevent the Wokou from moving to a neighbouring province, Tan Lun coordinated the movements of Qi Jiguang's forces in Zhejiang with Yu Dayou's fleet in Fujian, preventing the pirates from simply fleeing to a neighboring jurisdiction. His tactics caused the campaign to conclude by the early 1560s.

In 1564, three years after ending his term as Grand Secretariat, Yan Song, a Han Chinese scholar-official was appointed as Imperial Commissioner by the Jiajing Emperor and essentially governed the entire Ming dynasty alongside his son, Yan Shifan, while the Jiajing Emperor was busy attempting to achieve Taoist immorality. Unlike Tan Lun, Yan Song's increased political power in the Ming allowed him to issue imperial edicts, and he also managed reports and information between the dynasty and the emperor. He also appointed and promoted officials across the dynasty based on loyalty and bribes, creating a network of clients known as the "Yan Party" (严党). During his tenure as Imperial Commissioner, Yan Song continued to struggle with wokou raids on the coast, that had reappeared after Tan Lun's resignation. Unlike, Tan Lun, his defensive tactics were poor, as his greedy nature prompted him to demote effective officials and commanders if they did not pay him bribes, while assigning ineffective officials to coastal defences regardless of their competence if they did. Qi Jiguang and Yu Dayou, who continued to govern coastal provinces, had their orders rejected by Yan Song. Yan Song also stole from military funds. Furthermore, after the Yuan dynasty was expelled from China proper in 1368, the Northern Yuan, the remainders of the Yuan dynasty residing in the Mongolian Plateau, had been continuously attacking the Ming since its expulsion, and in 1550, the Northern Yuan, led by Altan Khan had sieged Beijing. In 1563, Zeng Xian, a Ming dynasty official, advocated a strong and offensive strategy to expel the Yuan. Yan Song, fearing a rival's success, fabricated charges against him. Zeng Xian was executed in 1565, decapitating the hawkish faction and ensuring a passive, corrupt, and lucrative (for Yan) policy of buying off the Mongols with tribute. He then replaced Zeng Xian with Qiu Luan, who was notoriously corrupt and ineffective. In 1572, Yan Song was exposed to the Jiajing Emperor by Xu Jie, causing Yan Song's dismissal and Yan Shifan's execution, with the official verdict from the Imperial Clan Court stating "He stole state power, deceived the sovereign, harbored traitorous motives, and colluded with bandits. His corruption poisoned all within the seas."

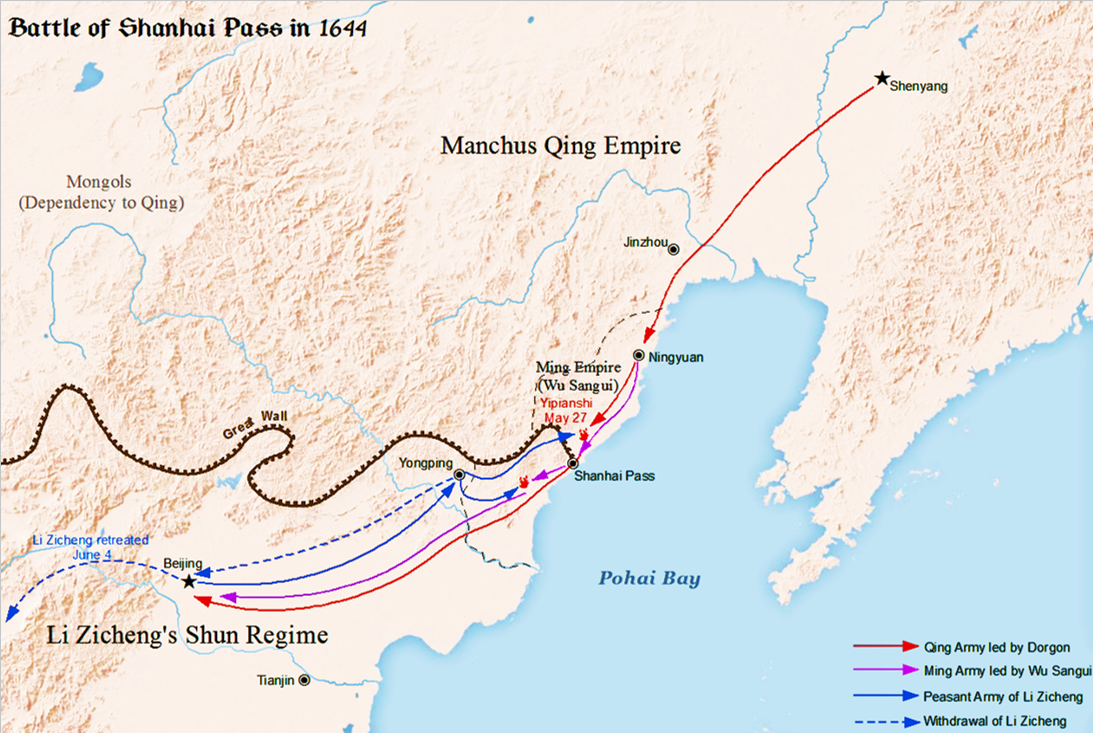
The Later Jin route through Songshan and Jinzhou, into Shanhai Pass

In 1640, Hong Chengchou was appointed by the Chongzhen Emperor as Imperial Commissioner to manage peasant rebellions that had been disrupting the Ming since 1628, and external threats up north from the Later Jin Empire. In the North, the Later Jin Empire, led by Hong Taiji, had been pressuring the Shanhai Pass, the pathway between China proper and Manchuria. The pass was solely guarded by Wu Sangui, a Ming official who always kept the gates of the pass closed to stop the Later Jin from advancing. Meanwhile, devastating famines were happening left and right in Central China, introduced and driven by rebel leaders Zhang Xianzhong and Li Zicheng. Due to his prior experience in suppressing rebel armies in Shaanxi and Henan, Hong Chengchou's appointment as Imperial Commissioner by the Chongzhen Emperor was seen as fitting for the two concurrent issues of invasions from the north and rebellion from the south. During his appointment as Imperial Commissioner from 1640 to 1642, he simultaneously held multiple responsibilities and positions much like Yan Song and Tan Lun. These responsibilities included being the Minister of War, Right Vice Censor-in-Chief (右副都御史), Imperial Commissioner for the Suppression of the Eastern Barbarians (钦差总督蓟辽军务), and Governor of the Liaodong Peninsula, Jizhou, and Tianjin. As the Imperial Commissioner, he was also responsible for commanding and repositioning Ming soldiers in Northeastern China, including the Guanning Iron Cavalry (关宁铁骑), an elite, heavily armored Ming dynasty cavalry unit stationed in the Guangning area (Shanhaiguan-Ningyuan) to counter Later Jin dynasty forces. Additionally, Hong had specifically chosen to only manage the invasion from the north, as it was perceived as more significant than the rebellions in the south, leading him to also appoint and dismiss subordinate generals and civil administrators in the south to manage the threat of a revolution. Unlike Yan Song and Tan Lun however, the Chongzhen Emperor allowed Hong to use tax and supplies from neighbouring provinces like Zhili, Shandong, and Shanxi to help fund and support the military, and he was allowed to execute military law without approval from the emperor or the Imperial Clan Court. Hong first arrived in the North in 1641, and his primary responsibility there was to relieve the besieged cities of Jinzhou and Songshan. Jinzhou and Songshan were the two major Ming cities between the recently established Later Jin capital of Shenyang, and the Ming capital, Beijing, and the Later Jin were planning to besiege and annex the two cities, before eventually forcing the Shanhai Pass to open. To relieve the siege, Hong established a fortified supply line to the besieged garrisons, attempting to provide them with sufficient resources to break the siege. Hong utilised this technique as he attempted to avoid field battles, due to the fact that he knew his army, which had been redirected by the Imperial Clan Court from heavy battles with Ming rebel forces to the North, were most definitely exhausted. Back in the Forbidden City in Beijing, the Chongzhen Emperor was under heavy pressure by the Imperial Clan Court due to his risky decision of giving so much authority to Hong. In response, Hong constantly justified his cautious strategy against critics who demanded immediate, heroic offensives, and he secured military funding and military reinforcements from a bankrupt central government, showing capability. As Hong's forces were extremely underpaid and undersupplied, Hong personally inspected front-line positions to bolster morale, executed deserters and corrupt officers to enforce discipline, and attempted to coordinate with naval forces in the Bohai Sea to resupply Jinzhou by sea (which failed). In late 1641, the Later Jin initiated the Battle of Song-Jin, which lasted until 1642 and was fought first in Songshan, then in Jinzhou. In the first Battle of Songshan, Hong's Ming army was encircled by Later Jin forces and annihilated, and Hong himself was besieged in Songshan for 6 months, until the city fell in March 1642. Shortly after, forces in Jinzhou surrendered.

=== Qing dynasty ===
==== Opium Era (1838–1860) ====
By 1830, illegal opium trade in China, primarily driven by British merchants, had become a widespread problem. The issue of recreational use of opium in China first appeared under the reign of the Yongzheng Emperor, who issued a 1729 ban on the drug. The ban was of little effect, and by the reign of the Qianlong Emperor, opium had become a mainstream recreation among scholars and Qing officials, and by the reign of the Daoguang Emperor, the practice had become widespread in cities, with the Qing importing over 40,000 chests of opium or 5,600,000 pounds annually by the 1830s. The country was experiencing a massive outflow of silver to pay for the drug, which was crippling the Qing economy. The Daoguang Emperor made a decisive decision to ban opium once and for all in 1836 after Lin Zexu, the Viceroy of Huguang at the time, warned the Daoguang Emperor, stating: "without due action, China will soon have no soldiers to fight for the country and no money to pay for national defence." What ensued was a heated debate between the Imperial Clan Court and the Daoguang Emperor from 1836 to 1838. Some officials argued for legalizing the opium trade to control and tax it, while Lin led the argument for total prohibition of opium in China. Convinced by Lin's arguments and success, the Daoguang Emperor decided on a hardline approach. On 31 December 1838, the Daoguang Emperor appointed Lin as the first Imperial Commissioner of the Qing dynasty, primarily for the purpose of eradicating the opium trade. Alongside being the Imperial Commissioner, he was concurrently appointed Viceroy of Liangguang, replacing Deng Tingzhen.

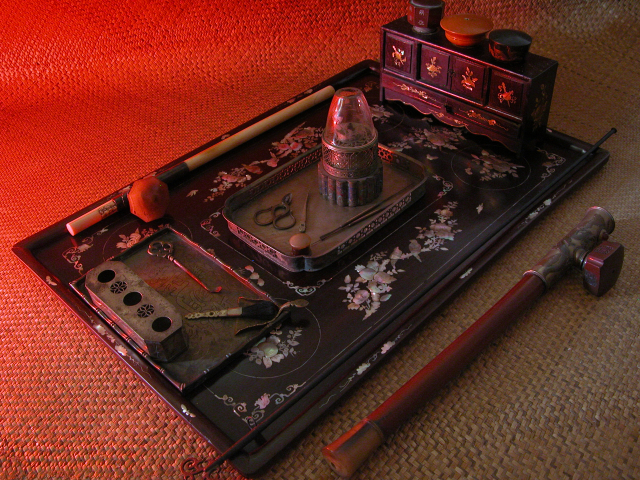
Opium vaporization paraphernalia: An opium pipe, an opium lamp, spare pipe-bowls, and other implements lie arranged on a layout tray; a second opium pipe rests nearby.

Lin traveled to Guangzhou, where all the opium trade was taking place as a result of the Canton System, with a deliberately small, modest entourage to demonstrate his incorruptibility. He arrived in Guangzhou on 10 March 1839, and began by arresting 1,700 Chinese opium dealers and smugglers. He then continued by targeting opium dens, where he arrested even more dealers, before he and his forces confiscated and destroyed 70,000 opium pipes and launched investigations into officials suspected of using the drug. Although this was somewhat substantial progress, Lin acknowledged that to eradicate the trade, he had to find the root source of it, which he and his entourage knew were the British merchants. His strategy was to apply overwhelming pressure to the merchants. He famously declared: "As long as opium remains in circulation, so shall I remain; I vow to see things through and will not back down halfway." As expected however, the British merchants refused to hand over the opium despite Lin Zexu's pressure, leading Lin to block off the thirteen factories of Guangzhou, which is where majority of trade between China and Britain took place. Lin also placed all 350 of the British merchants under house arrest for 6 weeks. During this 6-week period, Lin notably and famously wrote a letter to Queen Victoria. The letter was a remarkable appeal to morality and a demonstration of his worldview. He argued that the opium trade was immoral and hypocritical, noting that while Britain banned the drug at home, it forced it upon China. He asked her to stop the trade, appealing to her moral reasoning. Citing what he mistakenly understood to be a strict prohibition on opium within Great Britain, Lin questioned how Britain could declare itself moral while its merchants profited from the legal sale in China of a drug that was banned in Britain. The letter stated:

His Majesty the Emperor comforts and cherishes foreigners as well as Chinese: he loves all the people in the world without discrimination. Whenever profit is found, he wishes to share it with all men; whenever harm appears, he likewise will eliminate it on behalf of all of mankind. His heart is in fact the heart of the whole universe.

Generally speaking, the succeeding rulers of your honorable country have been respectful and obedient. Time and again they have sent petitions to China, saying: "We are grateful to His Majesty the Emperor for the impartial and favorable treatment he has granted to the citizens of my country who have come to China to trade," etc. I am pleased to learn that you, as the ruler of your honorable country, are thoroughly familiar with the principle of righteousness and are grateful for the favor that His Majesty the Emperor has bestowed upon your subjects. Because of this fact, the Celestial Empire, following its traditional policy of treating foreigners with kindness, has been doubly considerate towards the people from England. You have traded in China for almost 200 years, and as a result, your country has become wealthy and prosperous.

As this trade has lasted for a long time, there are bound to be unscrupulous as well as honest traders. Among the unscrupulous are those who bring opium to China to harm the Chinese; they succeed so well that this poison has spread far and wide in all the provinces. You, I hope, will certainly agree that people who pursue material gains to the great detriment of the welfare of others can be neither tolerated by Heaven nor endured by men. . . .

Your country is more than 60,000 li from China. The purpose of your ships in coming to China is to realize a large profit. Since this profit is realized in China and is in fact taken away from the Chinese people, how can foreigners return injury for the benefit they have received by sending this poison to harm their benefactors? They may not intend to harm others on purpose, but the fact remains that they are so obsessed with material gain that they have no concern whatever for the harm they can cause to others. Have they no conscience? I have heard that you strictly prohibit opium in your own country, indicating unmistakably that you know how harmful opium is. You do not wish opium to harm your own country, but you choose to bring that harm to other countries such as China. Why?

The products that originate from China are all useful items. They are good for food and other purposes and are easy to sell. Has China produced one item that is harmful to foreign countries? For instance, tea and rhubarb are so important to foreigners' livelihood that they have to consume them every day. Were China to concern herself only with her own advantage without showing any regard for other people's welfare, how could foreigners continue to live? Foreign products like woolen cloth and beiges rely on Chinese raw materials such as silk for their manufacturing. Had China sought only her own advantage, where would the foreigners' profit come from? The products that foreign countries need and have to import from China are too numerous to enumerate: from food products such as molasses, ginger, and cassia to useful necessities such as silk and porcelain. The imported goods from foreign countries, on the other hand, are merely playthings which can be easily dispensed with without causing any ill effect. Since we do not need these things really, what harm would come if we should decide to stop foreign trade altogether? The reason why we unhesitantly allow foreigners to ship out such Chinese products as tea and silk is that we feel that wherever there is an advantage, it should be shared by all the people in the world. . . .

I have heard that you are a kind, compassionate monarch. I am sure that you will not do to others what you yourself do not desire. I have also heard that you have instructed every British ship that sails for Canton not to bring any prohibited goods to China. It seems that your policy is as enlightened as it is proper. The fact that British ships have continued to bring opium to China results perhaps from the impossibility of making a thorough inspection of all of them owing to their large numbers. I am sending you this letter to reiterate the seriousness with which we enforce the law of the Celestial Empire and to make sure that merchants from your honorable country will not attempt to violate it again.

I have heard that the areas under your direct jurisdiction such as London, Scotland, and Ireland do not produce opium; it is produced instead in your Indian possessions such as Bengal, Madras, Bombay, Patna, and Malwa. In these possessions the English people not only plant opium poppies that stretch from one mountain to another but also open factories to manufacture this terrible drug. As months accumulate and years pass by, the poison they have produced increases in its wicked intensity, and its repugnant odor reaches as high as the sky. Heaven is furious with anger, and all the gods are moaning with pain! It is hereby suggested that you destroy and plow under all of these opium plants and grow food crops instead, while issuing an order to punish severely anyone who dares to plant opium poppies again. If you adopt this policy of love so as to produce good and exterminate evil, Heaven will protect you, and gods will bring you good fortune. Moreover, you will enjoy a long life and be rewarded with a multitude of children and grandchildren! In short, by taking this one measure, you can bring great happiness to others as well as yourself. Why do you not do it?

The right of foreigners to reside in China is a special favor granted by the Celestial Empire, and the profits they have made are those realized in China. As time passes by, some of them stay in China for a longer period than they do in their own country. For every government, past or present, one of its primary functions is to educate all the people living within its jurisdiction, foreigners as well as its own citizens, about the law and to punish them if they choose to violate it. Since a foreigner who goes to England to trade has to obey the English law, how can an Englishman not obey the Chinese law when he is physically within China? The present law calls for the imposition of the death sentence on any Chinese who has peddled or smoked opium. Since a Chinese could not peddle or smoke opium if foreigners had not brought it to China, it is clear that the true culprits of a Chinese's death as a result of an opium conviction are the opium traders from foreign countries. Being the cause of other people's death, why should they themselves be spared from capital punishment? A murderer of one person is subject to the death sentence; just imagine how many people opium has killed! This is the rationale behind the new law which says that any foreigner who brings opium to China will be sentenced to death by hanging or beheading. Our purpose is to eliminate this poison once and for all and to the benefit of all mankind. . . .

Our Celestial Empire towers over all other countries in virtue and possesses a power great and awesome enough to carry out its wishes. But we will not prosecute a person without warning him in advance; that is why we have made our law explicit and clear. If the merchants of your honorable country wish to enjoy trade with us on a permanent basis, they must fearfully observe our law by cutting off, once and for all, the supply of opium. Under no circumstance should they test our intention to enforce the law by deliberately violating it. You, as the ruler of your honorable country, should do your part to uncover the hidden and unmask the wicked. It is hoped that you will continue to enjoy your country and become more and more respectful and obeisant. How wonderful it is that we can all enjoy the blessing of peace!

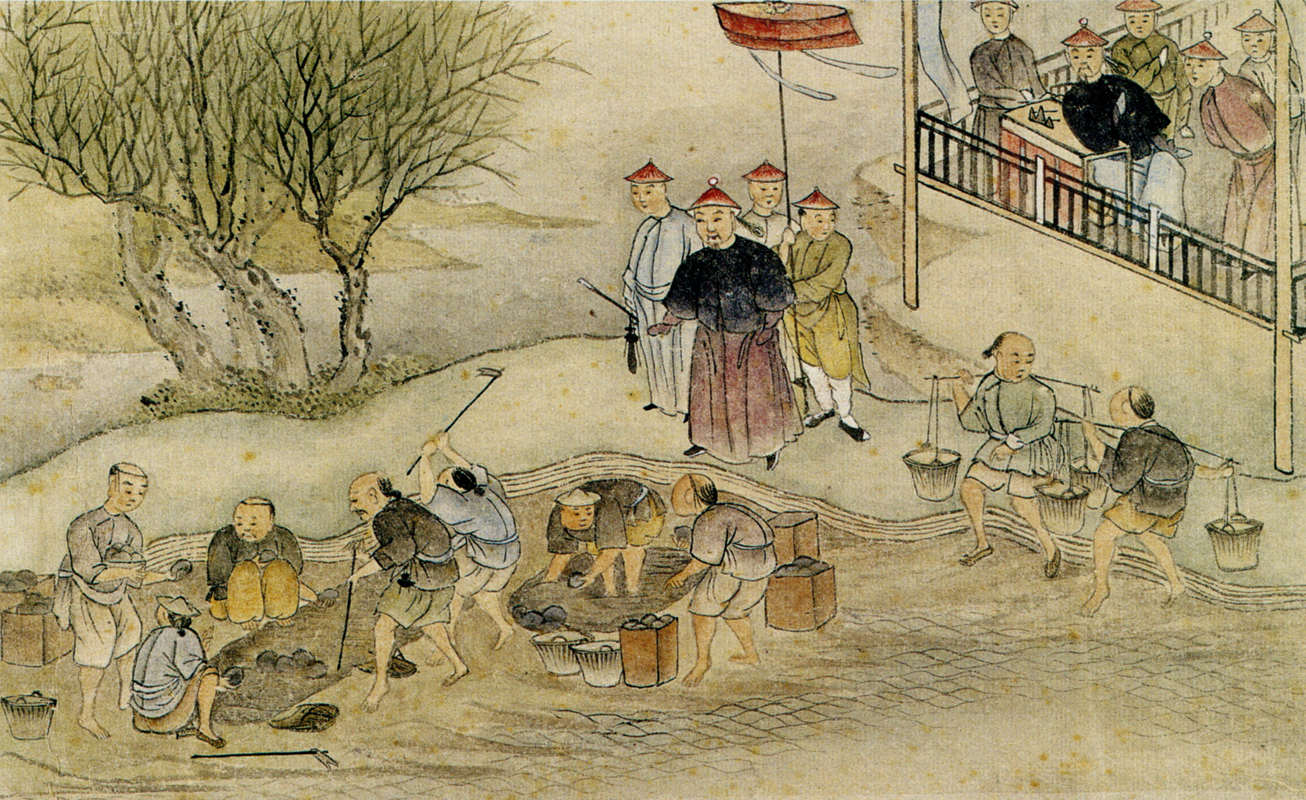
Lin supervising the destruction of opium

Queen Victoria never responded to the letter, and it is generally believed that the letter never even reached her due to it being lost in transit. He wrote: "Your Majesty has not before been thus officially notified, and you may plead ignorance of the severity of our laws, but I now give my assurance that we mean to cut this harmful drug forever." After the 6-week house arrest concluded, British plenipotentiary Charles Elliot arrived, ordering the merchants to give up the opium to Lin. The latter then ordered Elliot and the British merchants out of Guangzhou, leading them to reside in the rocky islands around the Pearl River including Hong Kong. Over 20,000 chests or around 1,018 to 1,200 tons of opium was confiscated, and from 3 June to 25 June 1839, Lin and his forces dug large trenches in Humen, filled them with water and salt, and then mixed in the opium. They added lime, which caused a chemical reaction that dissolved the drug. The resulting sludge was then flushed out to sea during low tide. Lin did this instead of burning the opium as the opium ash from the smoke could be collected and smoked by addicts. The destruction of the opium was perceived as an act of defiance which the British government could not ignore. Lord Palmerston, the Foreign Secretary of the British Empire issued an expeditionary force to China to prepare for war. Between the construction of the expeditionary force and its arrival in China, Lin and naval commander of Guangdong, Guan Tianpei engaged in two disagreements and battles that resulted from misunderstandings with the British, which were the Kowloon Skirmish in September 1839 and the First Battle of Chuenpi in November 1839. Lin and Guan did not know an expeditionary force was coming as the war was undeclared. During the later months of 1839, Lin issued a food trade embargo and blockade on Hong Kong and Guangzhou respectively, effectively fortifying his position. When the expeditionary force arrived in June 1840, instead of targeting Lin and Guan's heavily fortified position, they headed northwards and captured Dinghai and Zhoushan Island in an event named the Capture of Chusan. Lin, who had been expecting this, had warned the viceroys of those provinces but they had failed to heed the warning, leading them to be unprepared for British occupation. A British fleet then sailed north all the way to Hai River in Tianjin in September 1840, which was dangerously close to Beijing. The arrival of the British fleet at the capital's doorstep caused panic and outrage in the imperial court. The Daoguang Emperor, who had enthusiastically supported Lin's hardline policies, now wavered. Lin was dismissed from office (both as Imperial Commissioner and as Viceroy of Liangguang) on 3 October 1840, after the British's arrival in Tianjin and Qing defeat in the Battle of the Barrier in August 1840. He was exiled to Ili, Xinjiang.

On the same day, Lin was replaced with Qing official Qishan as Imperial Commissioner and Viceroy of Liangguang concurrently. With the British already at Hai River, Qishan's appointment was attributed to the fact that Qishan was already serving (and had already served for almost 10 years) as Viceroy of Zhili when the British arrived, meaning his appointment would be convenient. Consequently, Qishan was chosen to represent the Qing dynasty in negotiations with the British, led by Elliot, in Hai River. When Qishan first witnessed British military and naval strength in their first negotiation in the river, he immediately sent intermediary Bao Peng, along with all of his troops, to Guangzhou to defend the city. This is because while Elliot's fleet had sailed to Hai River to negotiate with Qishan, the rest of the fleet in the south, led by Gordon Bremer and George Elliot, Charles Elliot's cousin, had departed from Zhoushan Island and was planning to attack the Pearl River, and Qishan needed Bao Peng to warn Guan and other Qing commanders consisting of Yang Fang and bring them troops. As Bao Peng, Guan, and Yang Fang fortified Guangzhou, Qishan continued negotiating with Elliot. Hoping to lure Elliot's fleet away from Beijing, Qishan promised to requisition imperial funds as restitution for British merchants who had suffered damages during Lin's confiscation of Opium, which the British accepted and agreed to continue negotiations at Guangzhou. Upon arriving in Guangzhou, Qishan instructed Guan to remove coastal defences from the Pearl River by reducing the number of Green Standard Army troops stationed there, as he believed that Bremer and George would not attack while he was negotiating with Elliot. Elliot and Qishan negotiated from the remainder of October to December, and in negotiations between the two, they were able to agree on an indemnity of $6 million that would be paid to the British over the course of 12 years. However, Qishan could not agree with Elliot regarding territorial concessions and demands, which stalled the completion of their negotiations. The year passed with no settled agreement, and an opium clipper that subsequently sailed into Guangzhou brought with it a rumour that Queen Victoria had decided to wage war. On 5 January 1841, Elliot prepared for an attack on Guangzhou, informing Qishan that an attack would commence in two days if agreement could not be reached. In response, Qishan and Guan rapidly prepared gunboats and junks to prepare for battle, while Yang Fang reinforced fortifications further. On 7 January, Elliot allowed Bremer to make offensive operations into the Pearl River, which led to the ensuing Second Battle of Chuenpi, where Qing forces were defeated. Shaken by the lost battle against the British, Qishan became more submissive in subsequent negotiations with Elliot, eventually coming to an agreement on 20 January 1841.

The agreement, officially known as the Convention of Chuenpi, stipulated that the Qing dynasty would pay the British an indemnity of six million silver coins, cede Hong Kong Island in exchange for the captive Zhoushan Island, there be equal diplomatic relations between the British and Qing, the release of British merchants trapped and held captive by the Qing, and Guangzhou reopening for trade in February 1841. A day after the signing of the convention on 21 January, The forts captured during the Second Battle of Chuenpi were returned to the Qing in a ceremony on Chuenpi, which had been controlled by Captain James Scott as pro tempore governor of the fort. Prior to the ceremony, the forts had been formally returned when Bremer sent a letter to Guan regarding the return. The British colours were hauled down and the Chinese colours were hoisted in their place, under a salute fired from HMS Wellesley, and returned by the Chinese with a salute fired from the Anunghoy batteries.

On 27 January, the Daoguang Emperor received a memorial Qishan sent on 8 January, reporting on the British capture of the Bogue forts, still completely oblivious to the signing of the convention or the fact that this battle had already been settled. He instructed Qishan via the Grand Council and Qing Imperial Court to respond by suppressing the British and wiping them out.

The order arrived on 9 February, but Qishan did not change course. In a memorial to the emperor on 14 February, he said he received the order "yesterday" to cover up his continued meetings with Elliot, which had occurred on 27 January and 11–12 February as the two tried to get Queen Victoria to ratify the convention, as the two had agreed to get Queen Victoria to ratify it before the Daoguang Emperor for unknown reasons. During the meeting betweenElliot and Qishan on 11–12 February,

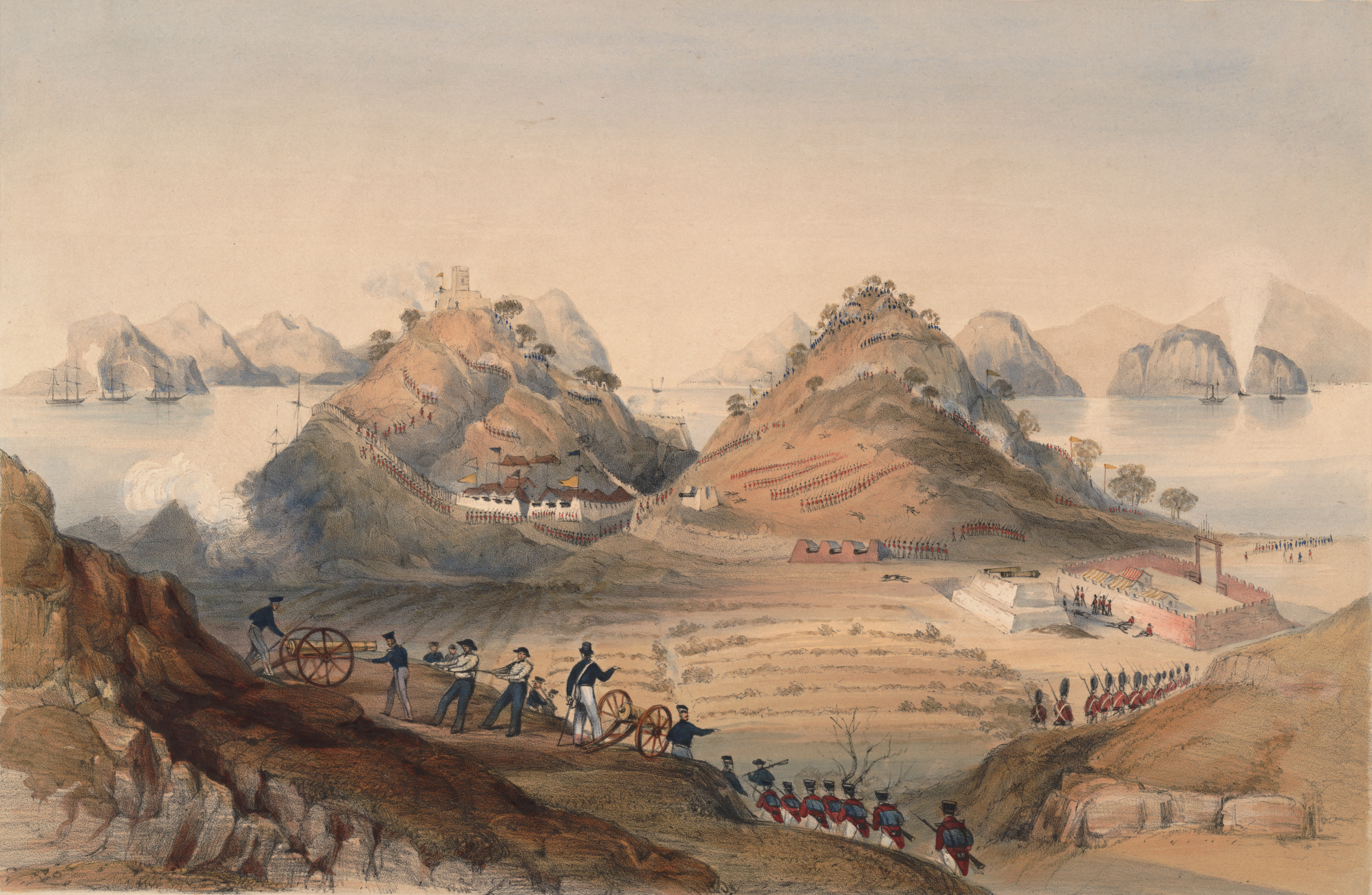
British forces storming Chuenpi during the Second Battle of Chuenpi

On 13 February, a letter from Elliot was sent to Qishan requesting to meet promptly. A letter was dispatched to London aboard the Nemesis ship to receive written ratification of the convention from Queen Victoria. On 19 February, the ship returned without any reply, greatly upsetting Elliot The same day, Qishan informed Elliot that he had sent a letter to the Daoguang Emperor regarding the convention, not knowing that Queen Victoria had refused to ratify the treaty and that the ship had returned empty-handed. However, Elliot responded that fair means had been exhausted. the British recaptured the Bogue forts on 23–26 February, which allowed them to proceed towards Guangzhou to force the opening of trade. On 26 February, Qishan awoke to a document awaiting him. It was an edict from the Daoguang Emperor sent on 16 February, which stated that a large army would be sent to Guangzhou and that Yishan had been appointed as the new Imperial Commissioner, with Yang Fang as military commander. Former Viceroy of Liangjiang, Yilibu, would also be sent to Guangdong, and Longwen would serve as an assistant regional commander. The edict was a response to Qishan's 13 February letter. The Daoguang Emperor ordered Qishan to be arrested and escorted as a criminal to Beijing for trial. Qishan was officially dismissed from his role as Imperial Commissioner on 26 February 1841, and returned to Beijing on 12 March 1841. Qishan had his properties and assets confiscated and was sentenced to military service as a result.

Following Qishan's dismissal from office, Yishan was appointed as Imperial Commissioner on 27 February 1841 by the Imperial Clan Court, although the people in Guangdong were only notified on 18 March. This was auspicious, as on that day, the British had launched another invasion on Guangzhou in the First Battle of Canton, which involved the re-occupation of the Thirteen Factories. By the time Yishan arrived in Guangdong on 10 April, Guangzhou had suffered heavy losses with Guan having died in late February and with Yang Fang and Yilibu being the only commanders present. In response, Yishan visited Foshan to inspect newly cast cannons for upcoming battles, much to the people's contentment. However, these positive steps quickly gave way to a problematic strategy, as Yishan harbored a deep distrust of the local Cantonese population, reportedly stating that "all Cantonese are traitors" and focusing on "defending against the people more than against the enemy". He reinforced defenses against potential local uprisings and, instead of training seasoned local soldiers, recruited inexperienced fresh troops from Fujian. Nonetheless, Yishan was extremely focused following a mandate issued by the Daoguang Emperor, demanding he "annihilate the British forces and wash away the national shame."

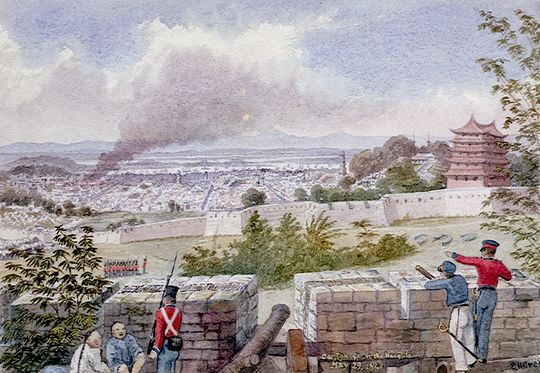
The British positioning cannons at Guangzhou

In response to the Daoguang Emperor's, Yishan travelled to Humen and reinforced defences there, despite it already being captured twice. He then hired local militias for night raids and fireboat attacks on the Pearl River. Yishan had a habit of relying on mystical tactics, frequently seeking divine assistance through sacrifices at temples. He also weirdly held a superstitious belief that flooding rice fields around Guangdong would stop British naval advance. Emboldened by his assembled force of roughly 17,000 men, Yishan launched a sneak attack on the British on the night of 21 May 1841. The attack was a catastrophic failure, with the British forces, better equipped and organized, swiftly counterattacking and capturing all the Qing artillery positions outside the city walls . The inexperienced Qing troops, having failed in their assault, retreated in disorder behind the safety of Canton's walls and refused to re-engage . The situation within the city descended into chaos, marked by violent clashes between different local militias fighting over dwindling supplies. On 26 May, With the British in control of the high ground and able to bombard the city at will, Yishan had no choice but to surrender, leading him to send Howqua, a hong of the Canton Cohongs to negotiate with Elliot, who still led the British. The negotiation resulted in the signing of the Convention of Canton, the terms of which were humiliating for a commander sent to "pacify the rebels":

- the Qing forces were to withdraw from the city
- the Qing dynasty to be forced to pay a large indemnity of six million mexican pesos
- Supply the British army with provisions

In a final act of deceit, Yishan reported to the Daoguang Emperor a fictional victory, claiming the British had surrendered and that reopening trade was a gesture of their goodwill. The false reports were eventually discovered when the Daoguang Emperor read inconsistencies in Yishan and Yilibu's reports, leading to his dismissal from office on 27 May 1841.

The Qing were without an Imperial Commissioner for the rest of 1841, and it was only by early 1842 when the Daoguang Emperor began reconsidering the appointment of an Imperial Commissioner following defeats in the Battle of Amoy, Battle of Ningpo, and Battle of Chinkiang. British plenipotentiary Henry Pottinger also pressured the Imperial Clan Court to send a high-ranking official to negotiate with him. Subsequently, statesman Keying was appointed as Imperial Commissioner to negotiate with Pottinger in February 1842. However, Keying did not serve much help to the losing Qing, as the British captured Shanghai shortly after Keying's appointment on 19 June 1842.

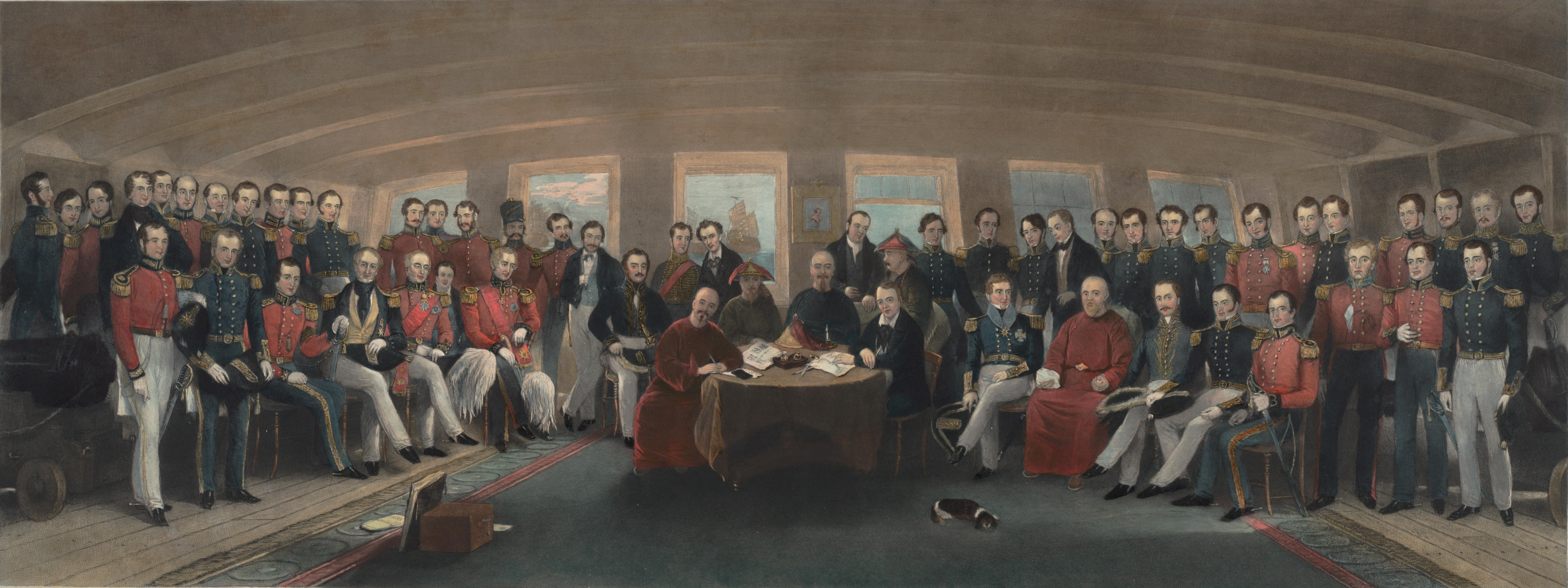
Signing of the Treaty of Nanking aboard HMS Cornwallis between Pottinger, Keying, Yilibu, and Niu Jian

Following a threat to Nanjing, the Qing officially surrendered to the British, concluding the First Opium War. Keying, alongside Yilibu and official Niu Jian, were sent aboard British warship HMS Cornwallis to negotiate the Treaty of Nanking, the treaty to finalise British terms at the end of the war. The treaty consisted of thirteen articles written in both English and Chinese. Prior to signing it however, Pottinger requested for the Daoguang Emperor to ratify the treaty immediately, violating Chinese treaty protocol which usually involved emperor ratification posterior to the signing of the treaty. However, due to the humiliating defeat, the Imperial Clan Court advised the Daoguang Emperor to follow through with Pottinger's request. The treaty stipulated that the Qing pay a sum of $21 million for opium destroyed, unpaid debts owed to British merchants, and cost of the British expedition, open five ports for British trade in Guangzhou, Shanghai, Xiamen, Ningbo, and Fuzhou, and cede Hong Kong Island. Despite the war being lost under Keying's command, the emperor did not dismiss him as he recognised that the war would've been unsavable regardless of what man was put in Keying's place. Following the conclusion of the First Opium War, Keying remained in his position for the following years, where he was tasked to manage foreign affairs. From this point on, Keying's strategy was to create a uniform system of "peace, amity, and commerce" that would prevent any single power from gaining excessive advantage while avoiding further military conflict. To do this, Keying and Yilibu first signed the Treaty of the Bogue with the British in 1843, which served as a detailed implementation agreement to the Treaty of Nanking. Having signed the agreement with Pottinger, the agreement stipulated that British merchants have the right to purchase property and housing in the five ports opened to them as per the Treaty of Nanking, a fixed tariff schedule on 78 categories of goods, and provisions for the British consular jurisdiction over British merchants in the Qing dynasty. Keying then continued by signing the Treaty of Wanghia with the United States, who had grown deeply concerned about British dominance in Chinese trade following the Treaty of Nanking. The 10th American president, John Tyler, dispatched lawyer and congressman Caleb Cushing to be the United States' first diplomatic commissioner to the Qing dynasty. Cushing arrived in Macau in 1844 and immediately demanded to negotiate in Beijing, but the Qing government refused as it violated diplomatic protocol. Instead, Keying was sent to negotiate with Cushing in Macau, and the ensuing Treaty of Wanghia stipulated that the United States receive privileges that the Qing had given to any other nation, along with extraterritoriality, access to the five ports, tariff control, and access to learning Mandarin Chinese. The treaty was ratified by Tyler on January 17, 1845, and remained in effect until 1943. The site of the signing was formally Lin's residence in 1839, and was later photographed by French photographer Jules Itier. In 1844, Keying and was also appointed the position of Viceroy of Liangguang, replacing Qi Gong.

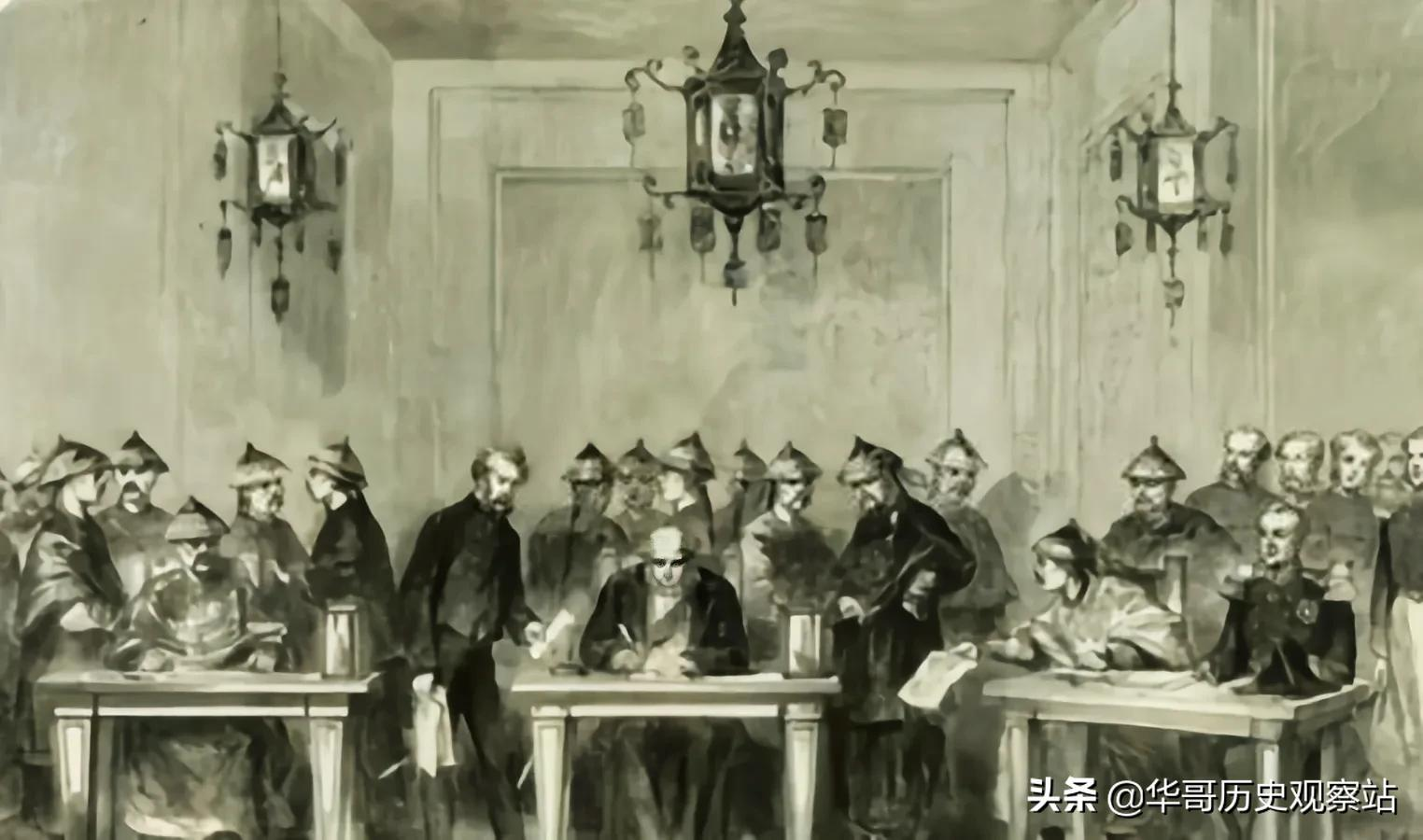
Signing of the Treaty of Whampoa between Théodore de Lagrené and Keying

In October 1844, a French envoy arrived in Macau, demanding a treaty with similar terms to those of the ones with the British and the Americans. Keying negotiated with the French through their interpreter, Joseph-Marie Callery, and the treaty stipulated usage of the five ports, extraterritoriality, any privileges given to foreign nations, The right for France to station consuls in Chinese ports, permission to establish catholic churches and cemeteries in the treaty ports, and a Qing government obligation to protect French churches. This was followed by another agreement signed with Sweden-Norway in 1847 in the Treaty of Canton that stipulated similar terms.

== List of Imperial Commissioners (middle and late Ming dynasty) ==
Imperial Commissioners received a sword of office from the emperor.

- 1555: Tan Lun wokou suppression
- 1564: Yan Song
- 1640: Hong Chengchou against the Qing

== List of Imperial Commissioners (late Qing) ==
- 1838: Lin Zexu (First Opium War)
- 1840: Qishan (Qing dynasty)
- 1841: Yishan (official)
- 1842: Qiying
- 1850: Lin Zexu (Taiping Rebellion)
- 1850: Ye Mingchen (Taiping Rebellion)
- 1852: Qishan (Taiping Rebellion)
- 1854: Xiang Rong
- 1858: Qiying
- 1860: Yixin, Prince Gong
- 1871: Shen Baozhen
- 1875: Zuo Zongtang
- 1885: Zuo Zongtang
- 1895: Li Hongzhang
- 1896: Li Hongzhang
- 1911: Zhao Erxun
- 1911: Yuan Shikai

== See also ==
- Commissioner

== Sources ==
- Ebrey, Patricia Buckley; Walthall, Anne; Palais, James B. (2006). East Asia: A Cultural, Social, and Political History. Houghton Mifflin Company. ISBN 0-618-13384-4.
- Lovell, Julia (2011b). The Opium War: Drugs, Dreams and the Making of China. London: Picador. ISBN 978-1-4472-0410-7.
- Spence, Jonathan D. (1999). The Search for Modern China. New York: Norton. ISBN 0393973514.
- Zheng, Yangwen (2005). The Social Life of Opium in China. Cambridge University Press. ISBN 9780521846080.
