= Huang Entong =

Chinese statesman and Confucian scholar (1801 – 1883)

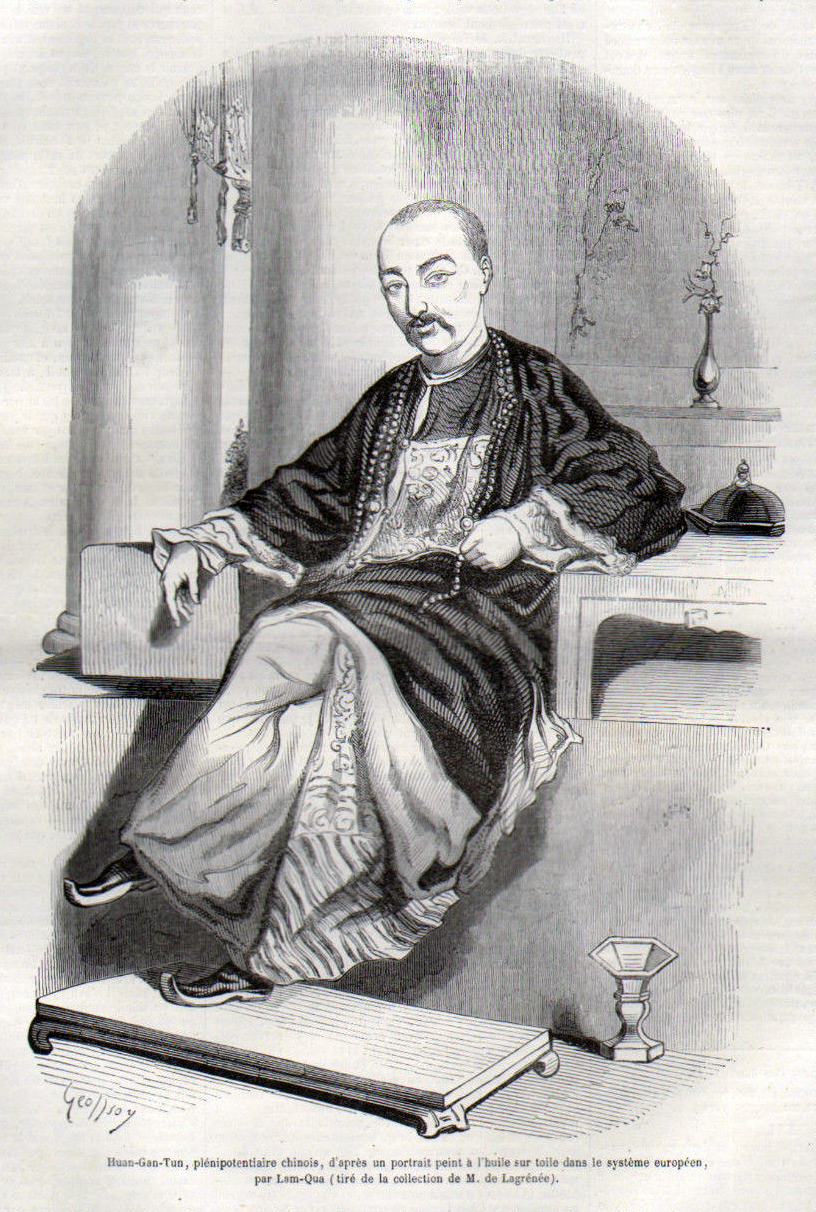
- Huang Entong's portrait published in the French journal L'Illustration.

Governor of Guangdong
- In office 1845-1846

Personal details
- Born: 1801 Ningyang, Shandong, Qing Empire
- Died: 1883 (aged 81–82) Ningyang, Shandong, Qing Empire
- Occupation: Politician

Huang Entong
- Traditional Chinese: 黃恩彤
- Simplified Chinese: 黄恩彤
Transcriptions
Standard Mandarin
- Hanyu Pinyin: Huáng Ēntóng

Huang Entong (黃恩彤, 1801 – 1883), courtesy name Shiqin (石琴), was a Chinese statesman and Confucian scholar of the late Qing dynasty. He participated with Keying and Yilibu in the negotiation between China and Britain during the First Opium War in 1842, and attended the signing of Treaty of Nanking.
