= Niu Jian =

Qing dynasty official (1785–1858)

Crown Prince Grand Tutor Niu Jian
- 牛鉴
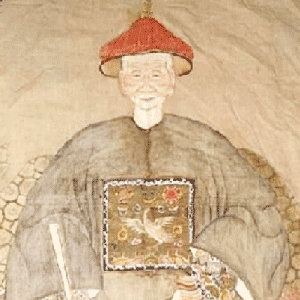
- Official portrait, 1858

Director of Grain Storage in Yunnan
- In office 1831–1833
- Monarch: Daoguang Emperor
- Succeeded by: himself

Provincial Judge of Shandong
- In office 1833–1834
- Monarch: Daoguang Emperor

Provincial Governor of Shuntian Prefecture
- In office 1834–1835
- Monarch: Daoguang Emperor

Financial commissioner of Jiangsu
- In office 1835–1837
- Monarch: Daoguang Emperor
- In office 1838–1839
- Monarch: Daoguang Emperor
- Preceded by: himself

Acting Governor of Jiangsu
- In office 1839–1840
- Monarch: Daoguang Emperor

Governor of Henan
- In office 1840–1841
- Monarch: Daoguang Emperor

Viceroy of Liangjiang
- In office 19 October 1841 – 17 October 1842
- Monarch: Daoguang Emperor
- Preceded by: Yuqian
- Succeeded by: Keying

Personal details
- Born: 1785 Wuwei, Gansu Province, Qing Dynasty
- Died: 7 June 1858 (aged 72–73) Wuwei, Gansu Province, Qing Dynasty
- Occupation: Politician, military general
- Awards: Fuzi Boxue plaque
- Posthumous name: Wenduan (文端)
- Known for: Negotiating the Treaty of Nanking alongside Keying and Yilibu

Military service
- Allegiance: Qing Dynasty
- Branch/service: Green Standard Army
- Years of service: 1853 - 1855
- Rank: Provincial Surveillance Commissioner
- Battles/wars: First Opium War: Battle of Woosung; Taiping Rebellion; Nian Rebellion

Niu Jian
- Chinese: 牛鉴
Transcriptions
Standard Mandarin
- Hanyu Pinyin: Niú jiàn

Jingtang (courtesy name)
- Traditional Chinese: 镜堂
- Simplified Chinese: 镜唐
Transcriptions
Standard Mandarin
- Hanyu Pinyin: Jìng táng

Niu Jian (Mandarin Chinese: 牛鉴; 1785–7 June 1858), courtesy name Jingtang (镜堂), art name Xueqiao (雪樵), was a high-ranking Chinese scholar-official and military commander of the late Qing Dynasty of China. He lived during Qianlong, Jiaqing, Daoguang, and Xianfeng reign, and is known for being one of the Qing Dynasty's representatives in signing the Treaty of Nanking, which ended the First Opium War.

Niu Jian was born in 1785 in a declining merchant family in Wuwei, Gansu Province, Qing Dynasty. He acquired the shengyuan degree in 1800 through the county-level imperial examinations, and obtained the juren and jinshi degrees in 1813 and 1814 respectively after passing the provincial and metropolitan level examinations. He served in the Hanlin Academy for 17 years before taking on posts outside of Beijing from 1831 to 1833. In 1834, he returned to Beijing to become the Governor of Shuntian Prefecture, before moving away again to Jiangsu to become the financial commissioner of the province. In 1841, he was promoted to viceroy and served as the Viceroy of Liangjiang from October 1841 to October 1842, where he participated in the Battle of Woosung as the co-commander alongside Chen Huacheng. In August 1842, he signed the Treaty of Nanking aboard the HMS Cornwallis with Qing Imperial Commissioner Keying, military commander Yilibu, and British plenipotentiary Henry Pottinger.

In his final years, he, as a military general, led Qing forces against the Taiping and Nian rebels during the Taiping Rebellion and Nian Rebellion respectively. He passed away in 1858 due to unknown causes, and was granted the posthumous name Wenduan (文端).

== Early life ==
Niu Jian was born into a declining merchant family in Wuwei, Gansu Province, Qing Dynasty. His father died when he was young, and he was raised by his mother, who was a woman named Jia. His mother, despite being only "roughly literate", ran a small inn or cart yard (牛家车院) in the south of the city to support the family and ensure her son could receive an education. Their financial situation was precarious, but they were not destitute. At a young age, he showed academic intelligence, having started his education earlier than his peers. However, his path to success remained nothing short of difficult. In 1800, despite passing the county-level imperial examination to acquire the shengyuan rank, Niu Jian continued suffering from poverty. From 1800 to 1814, Niu Jian continued rising through the ranks, eventually becoming a linsheng (a stipendiary student) and then a bagongsheng (a tribute student). Despite this, by 1813, Niu Jian had failed the provincial-level imperial examination fifteen times before finally passing and acquiring the juren degree, and in 1814, Niu Jian finally passed the metropolitan imperial examination to earn the jinshi degree, officially entering the Qing bureaucracy.

== Early career ==
=== Hanlin Academy ===
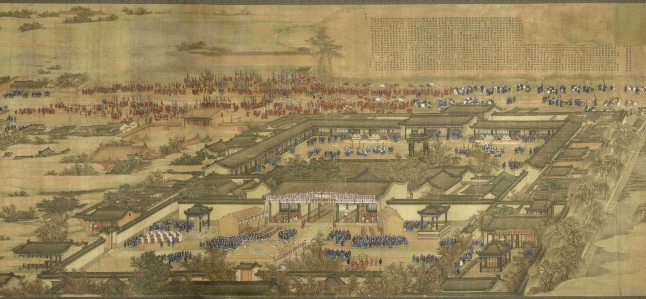
Image of the Hanlin Academy

Following his entrance into the Qing bureaucracy, Niu Jian became a shujishi (庶吉士), meaning "all good men of virtue" at the prestigious Hanlin Academy. The Shujishi was a highly prestigious scholastic title awarded to top-ranking scholars of the Qing, which he was as he had placed second class fourth place in the imperial examinations. In the Hanlin Academy, Niu Jian served as a compiler, and later as a censorate (yushi) and Supervising Secretary (jishizhong). His position as a compiler meant he was tasked with editing Qing state records and writing dynastic histories, which was crucial to the dynasty as it helped preserve legitimacy of the Qing's government, history, records, and documentation. Meanwhile, his later position as a censorate, also known as an investigating censor, made him responsible for being the dynasty's supreme supervisory and anti-corruption agency, responsible for investigating misconduct and corruptions from officials for the emperor.

=== Appointments outside of Beijing ===
Niu Jian left the Hanlin Academy in 1831 after being appointed by the Daoguang Emperor as director of grain storage in Yunnan province. This position was a specialized circuit intendant (dao) post responsible for the province's grain administration, which was highly important and significant as Yunnan was a landlocked province that boasted substantial amounts of mountainous terrain. This meant that Yunnan uniquely suffered issues of insufficient agricultural production and grain transport difficulties due to a lack of water access and the mountainous terrain, and its position as the southernmost frontier of the Qing meant monsoons were also extremely common compared to the rest of the dynasty, making the atmosphere less familiar to the Qing population compared to other, more northern provinces. Niu Jian was therefore responsible for managing the provincial granary system, particularly the changpingcang (ever-normal granaries), to ensure adequate grain reserves in the province for potential famine relief, military supplies, and price stabilization. Niu Jian's appointment to this position was also his first outside of Beijing, and his first as an administrator. After serving for two years in the position however, Niu Jian was relocated to be the acting provincial judge of Shandong province in 1833. This post was the second-highest governing body of the province, only below the position of Grand coordinator and provincial governor, also known as xunfu. In this post, Niu Jian served as the judicial and law enforcement officer of the province, with responsibilities in supervising all provincial-level judicial proceedings and criminal cases, managing the provincial prison system, overseeing law enforcement and public security, and reviewing capital cases before they were forwarded to the Qing imperial court for final approval. Niu Jian's appointment in this post in Shandong, a wealthy and strategically important province, signified a major promotion.

After Niu Jian's excellent performance at this post, he was promoted to Governor of Shuntian Prefecture, the prefecture that encompassed Beijing and its surrounding territories, in 1834. The post was among the most prestigious positions in the entire dynasty, and was the most prestigious prefecture-level governing position. In this post, Niu Jian's responsibilities included maintaining public order in the capital region, managing local administration, overseeing the imperial examination system in the metropolitan area, and handling all the complex administrative matters arising from the presence of the court and central bureaucracy. It was the first time Niu Jian would be governing a specific region, and it being the region that included the capital made it critical.

In 1835, Niu Jian was appointed to become the financial commissioner of Jiangsu province. Jiangsu was among the richest regions in the Qing Dynasty at the time, and Niu Jian's appointment as financial commissioner meant he was once again the second-highest governing body of the province, only below that of xunfu. The position was sometimes referred to as the fangbo (方伯) or fan tai (藩台). The Financial Commissioner's duties were wide-ranging and included managing the provincial treasury, collecting land and poll taxes, and ensuring the timely remittance of revenues to the central government, recommending appointments, promotions, and evaluations of all subordinate officials (prefects and magistrates) within the province, compiling and submitting the annual provincial census and tax registers, and overseeing the provincial granaries and the grain tribute system. Despite it looking like a setback, the financial commissioner of such a rich province had a huge responsibility, as any mistakes could result in national consequences as it would greatly impact the national economy. Niu Jian however soon clashed with the xunfu and, unable to work harmoniously with him, requested sick leave and returned to his hometown in 1837, which was a conventional way for officials to withdraw from a difficult situation in office without losing face or reputation. However, his return to his hometown was short-lived, as in 1838, he was reappointed as the Financial Commissioner of Jiangsu, and later served as the acting Governor of the same province.

=== Yellow River Flood ===
In 1841, Niu Jian was serving as the Governor of Henan province when the catastrophic Yellow River flood occurred. His position meant that he was responsible for protecting the provincial capital, Kaifeng, from the flooding. He organized the city's defenses, directing the construction of barriers with the local populace. The Daoguang Emperor was so impressed by his efforts that he was personally commended and soon after promoted to the vital post of Viceroy of Liangjiang (covering Jiangsu province, Anhui province, and Jiangxi province), making him one of the most powerful officials in the empire.

== First Opium War ==
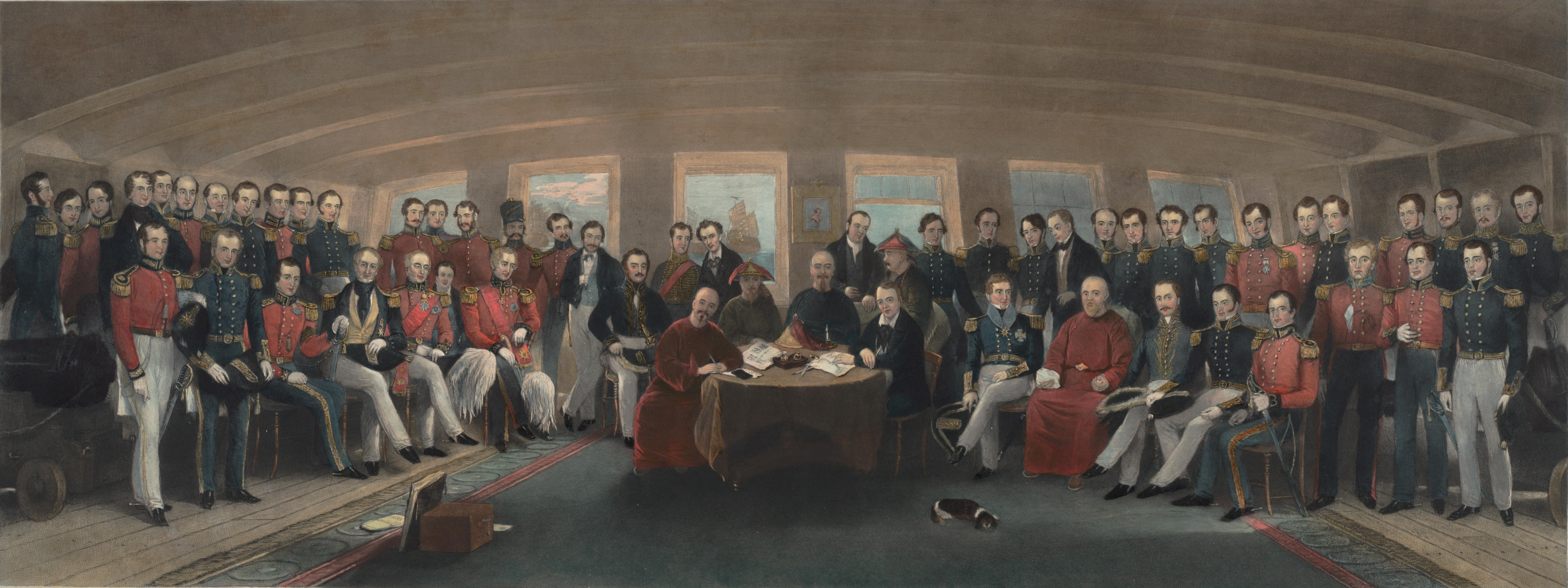
Signing of the Treaty of Nanking

His first promotion to viceroy in 1842 came at a crucial point during the First Opium War between the Qing and the British Empire. Being an administrator in the civil service with no prior military experience, Niu Jian was in an extremely disadvantaged position. On 16 June 1842, the Battle of Woosung took place near the Huangpu River in Jiangsu province. From Wusong, the British would only have to advance 19 kilometres to capture Shanghai. In the battle, Niu Jian demonstrated a fatal lack of military acumen. In an effort to encourage the troops, he approached the front in a grand, official procession. This made him a target for British naval guns, and the ensuing artillery fire scattered his entourage and caused a rout. Although Niu Jian was supposed to bring more supplies, the panic in his entourage prompted him to flee the battleground. As a result, the veteran commander, Chen Huacheng, with no support, was killed. Consequently, the British captured the towns of Wusong and Baoshan, which opened the way to Shanghai, which was captured with little resistance on 19 June.

After the fall of Zhenjiang, Niu Jian lost all confidence in the army. When the British fleet arrived near Nanjing, he sent desperate pleas for peace and began negotiating a surrender, sometimes acting beyond his authority.

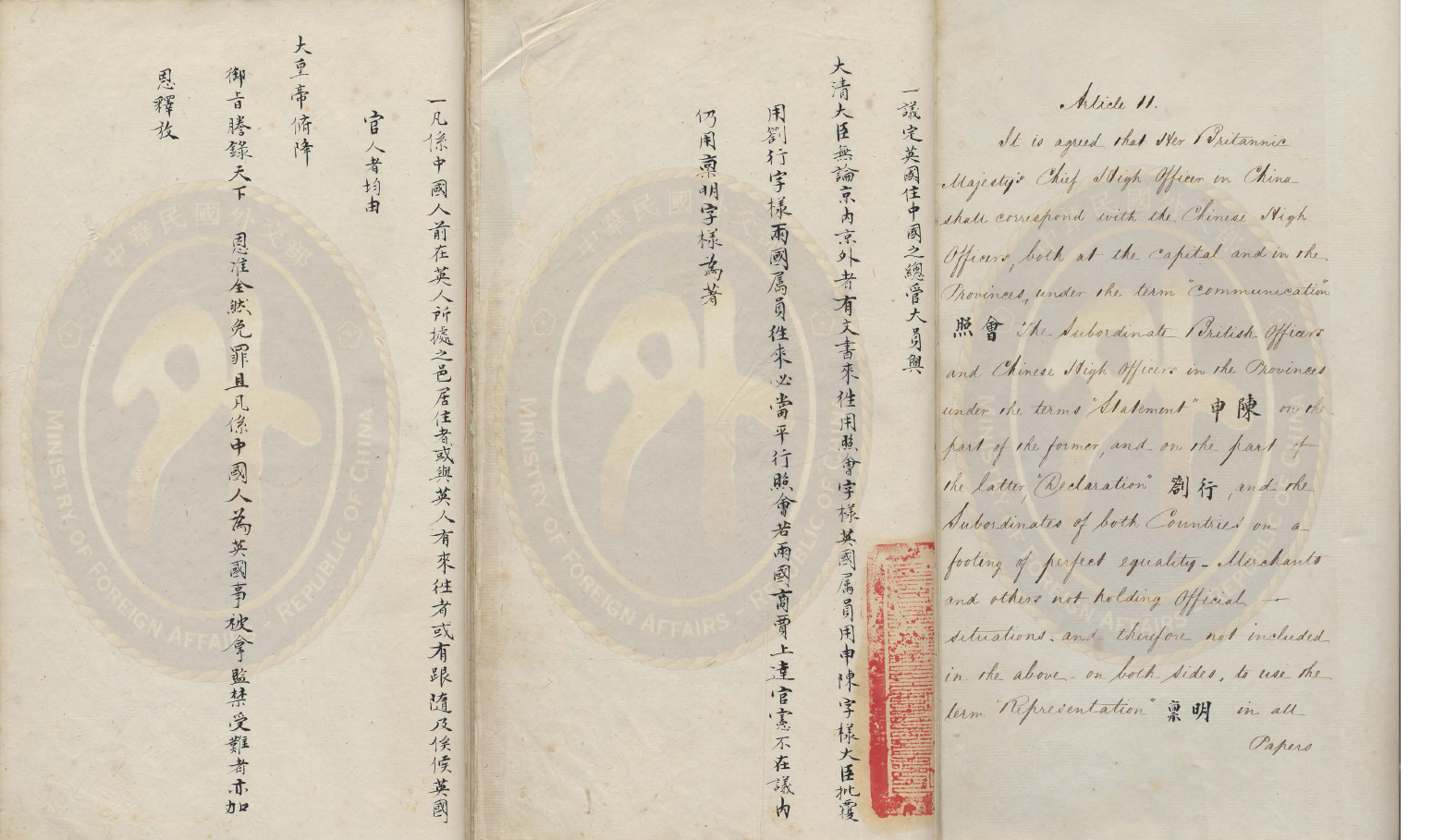
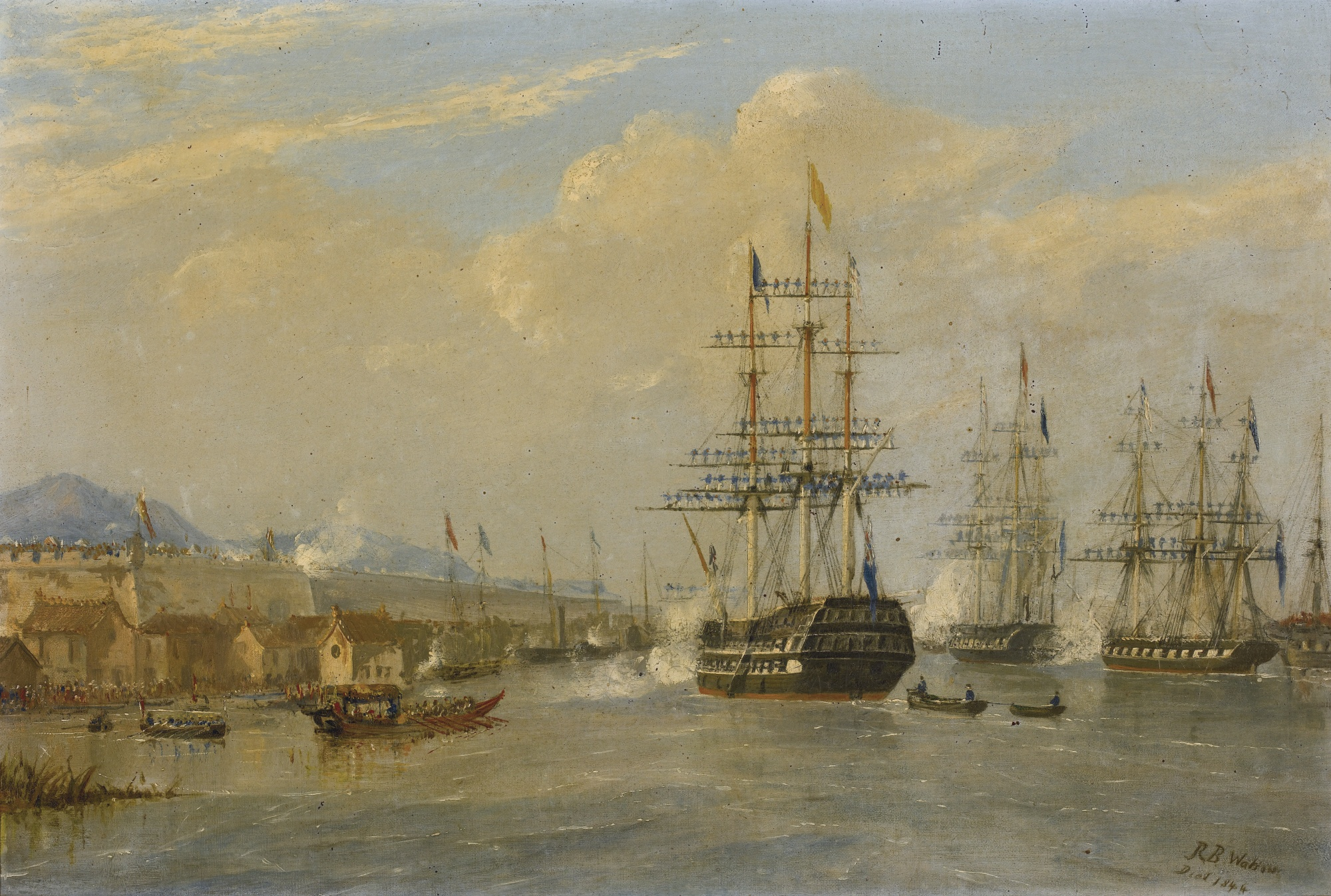
Chinese and English pages of the treaty (left) and HMS Cornwallis sailing away posterior to the signing

On 29 August 1842, the British ship HMS Cornwallis arrived on the outskirts of Nanjing to force a Qing surrender. The Daoguang Emperor and Qing Imperial Court assigned Qing Imperial Commissioner Keying and military commander Yilibu to negotiate with British diplomats aboard the ship. With Nanjing being located in Jiangsu, Niu Jian was also invited aboard. In the ensuing negotiations, the Treaty of Nanking was signed by the British and the Qing, with British plenipotentiary Henry Pottinger as the British signatory, and Keying, Yilibu, and Niu Jian serving as the Qing signatories. The treaty was ratified on the same day by the Daoguang Emperor, with the treaty itself stipulating the abolishment of the Canton System and therefore the abolishment of the cohong and the thirteen factories, with it being replaced with the establishment of five treaty ports in Guangzhou, Fuzhou, Xiamen, Ningbo, and Shanghai until 1943, the obligation for the Qing government to pay a sum of $15 million to the British ($6 million for the opium destroyed in the destruction of opium at Humen by Lin Zexu, $6 million for the ransom in the Convention of Canton signed by Yishan, and $3 million for the debt owed by cohongs to British merchants), and the cession of Hong Kong Island and Kowloon to the British. In return, the British would withdraw all forces from Qing territory.

After his signature of the Treaty of Nanking, Niu Jian was dismissed from his post and arrested for neglecting the defence of the borders of Jiangsu, Jiangxi, and Anhui provinces. He was sentenced to death, but his sentence was reprieved in autumn. In 1844, he was released from punishment by imperial decree and was therefore ordered to go to Zhongmu, Henan province to work on a river project.

== Taiping and Nian Rebellion ==
After his release from prison in 1844 and work on the Yellow River conservancy projects, Niu Jian lived in retirement. In 1853 however, Niu Jian was called back from retirement when Taiping Heavenly Kingdom forces threatened to invade provinces north of Guangdong. He was appointed as a fifth-rank official hat and appointed as the Acting Provincial Judge (Anchashi) of Henan province. With Taiping forces mainly stationed in Nanjing, the position seemed fortified for the time being. Imperial Commissioner Qishan had sieged the city and was actively cutting supply lines, while military general Sengge Rinchen was stationed north of Nanjing and Niu Jian west of the city in Henan. However, it was only May 1853 when the Taiping forces had broken through Qishan's siege and were heading directly for the capital, with some forces marching through Henan province. Niu Jian, with the assistance of Sengge Rinchen, successfully held the forces back in what would become known as the failed northern expedition. Not long after however, the newly crowned Xianfeng Emperor would redirect Niu Jian's focus onto the contemporaneous Nian Rebellion.

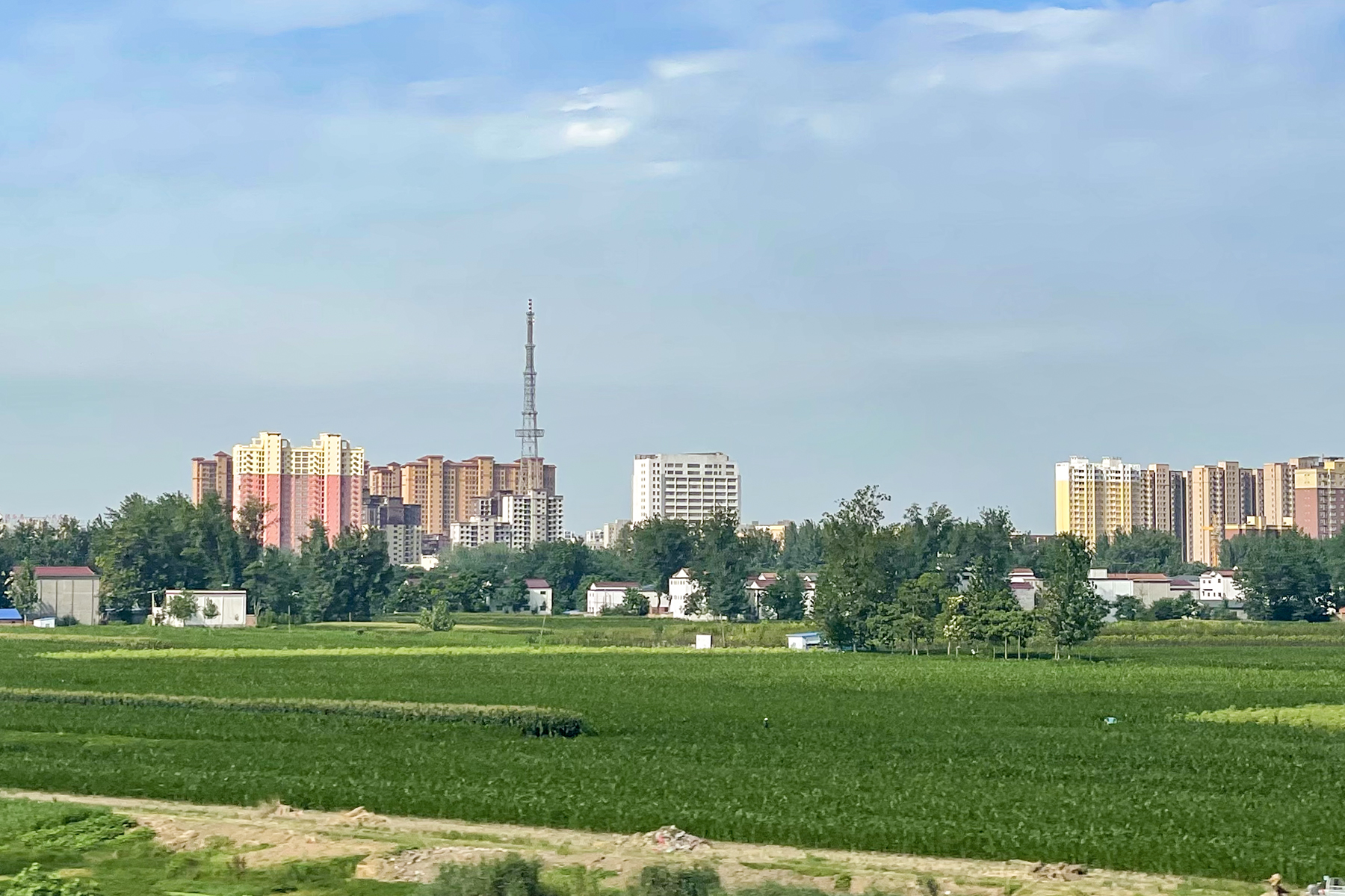
Image of where the Battle of Shenqiu County took place

In 1854, Niu Jian, who had become aware of the rebellion through the Xianfeng Emperor, was redirected to Chenzhou, Hunan province to meet up with former Viceroy of Liangguang, Xu Guangjin, in suppressing the Nian rebel forces near Huai River, between Anhui and Henan provinces, where Nian activity was rampant. The Qing imperial court had issued orders for Niu Jian and Xu to cross provincial borders to suppress the rebels, whereas Henan Governor Yinggui was instructed to order Niu Jian and Xu to pursue and capture the rebels across provincial borders. To prepare, Niu Jian mobilized his forces by recruiting 500 to 600 "brave" volunteers and gathering funds from local donations. He also requisitioned cannons, swords, and other weapons from local gentry, including a gentleman named Song Yujin, and others who donated equipment to support his force. The necessary pay and provisions for his troops were drawn from funds raised by a local donation bureau. However, Niu Jian faced challenges with his troop strength. He reported that there were only about 1,000 defense troops in the Chenzhou area and his own "Ruiyong" (elite volunteer) force also numbered only about 1,000 men, which he considered insufficient for the task. As they were preparing, Nian leaders Li Shilin, Ren Erpi, and Li Fengqi had already gathered over 2,000 followers and were actively pillaging the region. As preparations concluded, Niu Jian and Xu began advancing towards Li Shilin's position. However, prior to arriving on 24 March 1854, Niu Jian and Xu encountered Nian leaders Liu Dongju and Rong Kuiyuan, who were patrolling the area with over 1,000 soldiers. In the ensuing battles, located near Shenqiu County and Xiangcheng City county, Niu Jian and Xu attacked the two Nian commanders and inflicted over 100 casualties before retreating, and on 14 April, Niu Jian and Xu led a second attack against the commanders. Despite receiving heavy resistance from the Nian soldiers, they were forced to retreat under heavy artillery bombardment, and after suffering multiple defeats at Liqiao and Weizhai, resulting in the capture of the two commanders and with over 400 soldiers killed, the Nian forces in the area surrendered.

Following the battles, Niu Jian and Xu continued advancing towards Li Shilin's position. However, on 26 April, Li Shilin led tens of thousands of his followers to attack the county seat of Gushi County, Henan, before also coordinating an attack on Shangcheng with Nian commander Li Zhaoshou. Although Qing forces repelled the attacks, the scale of Li Shilin's army alarmed the Qing government, prompting them to urge Niu Jian and Xu to execute an attack on Li Shilin as soon as possible. As a result, on 7 May, Niu Jian, Xu, and Qing commanders Lu Ximo and Ma Cigan, arrived near Li Shilin's location, before setting up camp near his post. Li Shilin and Nian forces, taking advantage of the unsteady Qing camp, launched an attack but were unsuccessful, losing approximately 100 men. The four Qing commanders then split the army into three divisions to attack Li Shilin's post, causing catastrophic damage. The Nian forces attempted a night raid in order to retaliate but were defeated again, and from May 13 to 15, continuous heavy fighting ensued, and the Nian forces suffered another major setback, with five to six thousand rebels scattering and fleeing. Following the countless defeats, Li Shilin fled to Wulongji town, in Xixian County. At the town, he bribed the magistrate and was therefore able to hide from Qing forces for some time. However, Li Shilin's position was immediately threatened when Governor Yinggui demanded that the four Qing commanders launch a combined attack on the town. To escape, Li Shilin, along with around 5,000 Nian soldiers, fled to Luoshan County on 3 November while the four Qing commanders chased them down. On the mountainous terrains of the county, battles occurred on the 7th and 8 November, in both of which Li Shilin lost a combined 300 soldiers, but were able to successfully kill Ma Cigan. As he continued fleeing, he eventually crossed the border into Hubei province, but was promptly caught and surrendered to Viceroy of Huguang, Yang Pei. After Li Shilin's surrender, his former soldiers and subordinates continued to fight and defend the Nian mission. In June 1855, following Yang Pei's dismissal from office, a series of conflicts involving Nian commanders Yi Tianfu and Zhu Mingyi ravaged the region. They captured Xixian County on 9 June and briefly took Guangshan County before being driven back by pursuing Qing forces led by Niu Jian. They were eventually defeated after a string of engagements, and their leaders were captured and killed .

However, the Qing Imperial Court, ever conscious of bureaucratic hierarchy, reminded Niu Jian that as a mere fifth-rank official, he was not authorized to report directly to the emperor. In February 1854, an imperial edict stated: "Since Niu Jian is an official who has been awarded a fifth-rank hat, he should not memorialize the throne on his own. Henceforth, all matters that need to be reported regarding the bandit-suppression efforts shall be submitted via the Governor as a substitute, in accordance with proper protocol." This edict was transmitted by 500-li express to ensure compliance.

== Death and Burial ==
Subsequently, as Niu Jian's health began to decline, he returned to his hometown in 1855. In 1856 however, he was honored with a second-rank official hat for his efforts in fundraising for the military campaigns. Niu Jian died two years later, on 7 June 1858, at his estate, the Red Cliff Manor (Hongya Shanzhuang) in Wuwei, Gansu province (also known as Niu Family Garden). The manor was bought after he was released from prison in 1844, and his burial involved a valuable coffin made of golden nanmu wood.

== Personal life ==
Niu Jian married relatively late, as he did not dare to marry until his career was stable. He had only one son, named Niu Yigu (牛怡谷), whereas he had a lot of daughters, all of whom married in the capital during his time as a Hanlin Academy editor. His son was a gongsheng (贡生), a type of government student. He had two grandchildren in Niu Rui (牛瑞) and Niu Hong (牛宏).

== See also ==
- Convention of Chuenpi
- Opium Wars
- Ye Mingchen
