= Convention of Canton =

1841 unequal treaty between the Qing Dynasty and the British Empire

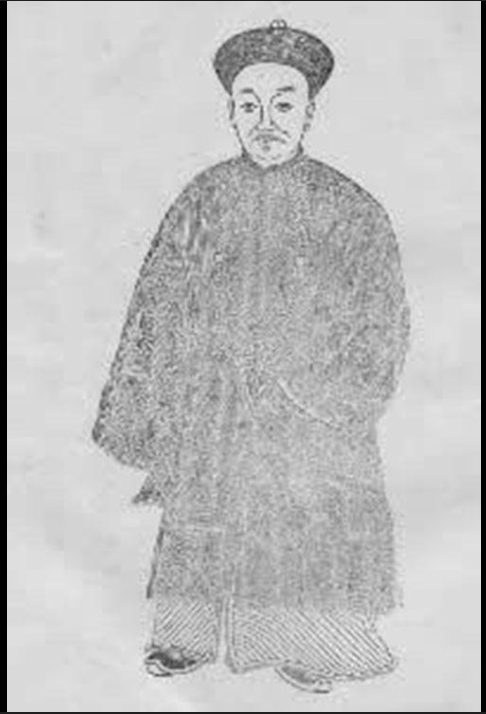
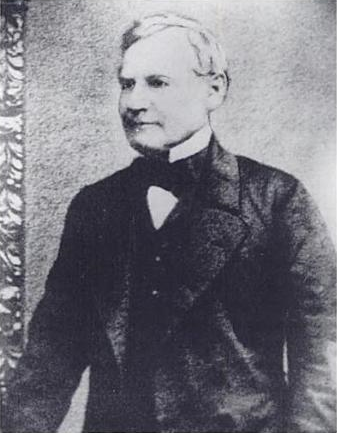
- Signatories Yishan (left) and Charles Elliot (right)
- Type: Unequal treaty
- Signed: 27 May 1841
- Location: Guangzhou, Qing Dynasty
- Signatories: (Qing dynasty) Yishan; (Qing dynasty) Howqua; (United Kingdom of Great Britain and Ireland) Charles Elliot
- Parties: Qing dynasty; (United Kingdom of Great Britain and Ireland) United Kingdom

The Convention of Canton (Mandarin Chinese: 广州和约), also known as the Canton Peace Agreement, was an unequal treaty signed on 27 May 1841 between the Qing Dynasty, represented by imperial commissioner Yishan and the United Kingdom, represented by plenipotentiary Charles Elliot. The treaty brought a temporary end to hostilities in the Canton area during the First Opium War after the conclusion of the Second Battle of Canton on 26 May 1841. It is considered the second unequal treaty in the history of the Qing Dynasty, following the Convention of Chuenpi signed (but never ratified) in January 1841.

== Background ==
Following Qishan's dismissal as imperial commissioner in February 1841, the Daoguang Emperor appointed Yishan to replace him, dispatching him with orders to expel the British from Guangzhou. However, by the time Yishan arrived in the Canton area on April 10, 1841, much of the strategic territory around the Pearl River was already under British control.

Emboldened by an assembled force of roughly 17,000 men and under pressure from the Daoguang Emperor to deliver a victory, Yishan ordered a surprise night attack on the British fleet on May 21, 1841. The attack was a catastrophic failure, with the British forces, being better equipped and organized under Elliot's command, swiftly counterattacking, capturing all the Qing artillery positions outside the city walls. The British then occupied the heights overlooking Canton, placing the defenseless city under direct threat of bombardment.

With no military options left, Yishan surrendered, sending one of the canton cohongs, Howqua, to negotiate with the British, led by Charles Elliot, on his behalf.

== Terms ==
The terms of the treaty were essentially a "ransom" paid by the city of Canton to prevent its destruction. The key provisions included the following:

- Qing troops would be forced to withdraw from Guangzhou with a distance of around 60 Chinese li (around 32 kilometers) within the span of 6 days
- The Qing government would have to pay a sum of $6 million Mexican pesos (around 4.2 million taels) to the British to cover their military expenses.
- $1 million dollars was to be paid immediately. The remaining balance was to be paid within seven days, and failure to meet this deadline would result in the total indemnity increasing by one million dollars per week, up to a maximum of nine million dollars.
- Compensation was to be paid for goods looted from the British factories and for a merchant ship mistakenly burned in 1839

== Aftermath ==
Despite the significant loss for the Qing army, Yishan sent false reports to the Daoguang Emperor claiming that the convention was actually targeted towards the British, falsely claiming that they had begged for peace and that the payment was merely the settlement of old commercial debts. In the immediate term, the treaty bought a temporary peace. The British withdrew their forces after receiving the payment, and Guangzhou was spared from occupation. However, the terms did not address the underlying disputes, and hostilities resumed on a larger scale later in 1841 under Henry Pottinger.
