= Mandate (criminal law) =

Legal concept

A criminal court may impose a "mandate" as part of a legal process on a person accused of a crime consisting of an obligation to engage in certain conditions or activities in exchange for suspension or reduction in penalty; such as, conditions of probation, conditional discharges, or other conditional sentences. For example, a defendant convicted of driving while intoxicated or drug possession may be mandated to engage in alcoholism or substance abuse rehabilitation. The term is paradoxical because acceptance of the "mandate" is a voluntary act by the defendant, who also has the option of serving what would most generally (though the relative weight is a matter determined by the individual's perspective and readiness to change) be viewed as a harsher alternative, such as incarceration. In this sense, the mandate is not truly mandatory, but is instead a type of legal fiction wherein the court assumes an illusion of power which, in actuality, is constrained by the defendant's free will.

== See also ==
- Free will
- Individual mandate
- Legal fictions
- Motivational interviewing
