= Treaty of the Bogue =

1843 treaty between China and the United Kingdom

Supplementary Treaty Signed By Their Excellencies Sir Henry Pottinger and Ki Ying Respectively, On The Part of the Sovereigns of Great Britain and China, At the Bogue, 8 October 1843.
- Type: Bilateral / Unequal
- Signed: 8 October 1843
- Location: Bogue (Humen), Guangdong
- Parties: Qing dynasty; United Kingdom
- Languages: English and Chinese

Full text
- Treaty of the Bogue at Wikisource

Treaty of the Bogue
- Traditional Chinese: 虎門條約
- Simplified Chinese: 虎门条约
Transcriptions
Standard Mandarin
- Hanyu Pinyin: Hǔmén tiáoyuē
- Wade–Giles: Hu3-men2 t'iao2-yüeh1
Yue: Cantonese
- Jyutping: fu2 mun4 tiu4 joek3

The Treaty of the Bogue (Chinese: 虎門條約) was an unequal treaty between the United Kingdom and China, concluded in October 1843 to supplement the previous Treaty of Nanking. The treaty's key provisions granted extraterritoriality and most favoured nation status to Britain.

== Background ==
In order to conclude the First Opium War, imperial commissioner Qiying and Henry Pottinger concluded the Treaty of Nanking aboard the British warship HMS Cornwallis in 1842 in Nanjing on the behalf of Britain and the Chinese Qing dynasty. The treaty became the first of a series of commercial treaties, often referred to as "unequal treaties", which China concluded against its wishes with Western powers.

== Terms ==
During the negotiations in Nanjing, China and Britain had agreed that a supplementary treaty be concluded, and on 22 July 1843 the two parties promulgated the "General Regulations of Trade with Britain and China" in Canton (Guangzhou). These regulations were included in the "Treaty of the Bogue", which Qiying and Pottinger signed on 8 October 1843 on the Bogue outside Canton.

The treaty laid down detailed regulations for Sino-British trade and specified terms under which Britons could reside in the newly opened ports of Shanghai, Ningbo, Xiamen (Amoy), Fuzhou, and Canton. While Britons were allowed to buy property in the treaty ports and reside there with their families, they were not allowed to travel to the interior of China or trade there.

The treaty also granted extraterritorial privileges to British subjects and most favoured nation status to Great Britain, which meant that the latter would enjoy any privilege granted to other powers.

== Aftermath ==
In China, the treaty is widely regarded as an imperialist one, which paved the way for the subjugation of China to Western imperialism. The treaty consolidated the "opening" of China to foreign trade in the wake of the First Opium War and allowed Britons to reside in parts of China, which had not been opened to foreigners before. In 1845, local Qing authorities and the British authorities promulgated the Shanghai Land regulations, which paved the way for the foundation of the Shanghai International Settlement. Similar agreements were concluded in other treaty ports, which created a social divide between the Europeans and Chinese citizens in the cities.

== See also ==
- Unequal treaties
- First and Second Opium Wars
- Imperialism in Asia
- Anglo-Chinese relations
