= Keying (official) =

Manchu statesman

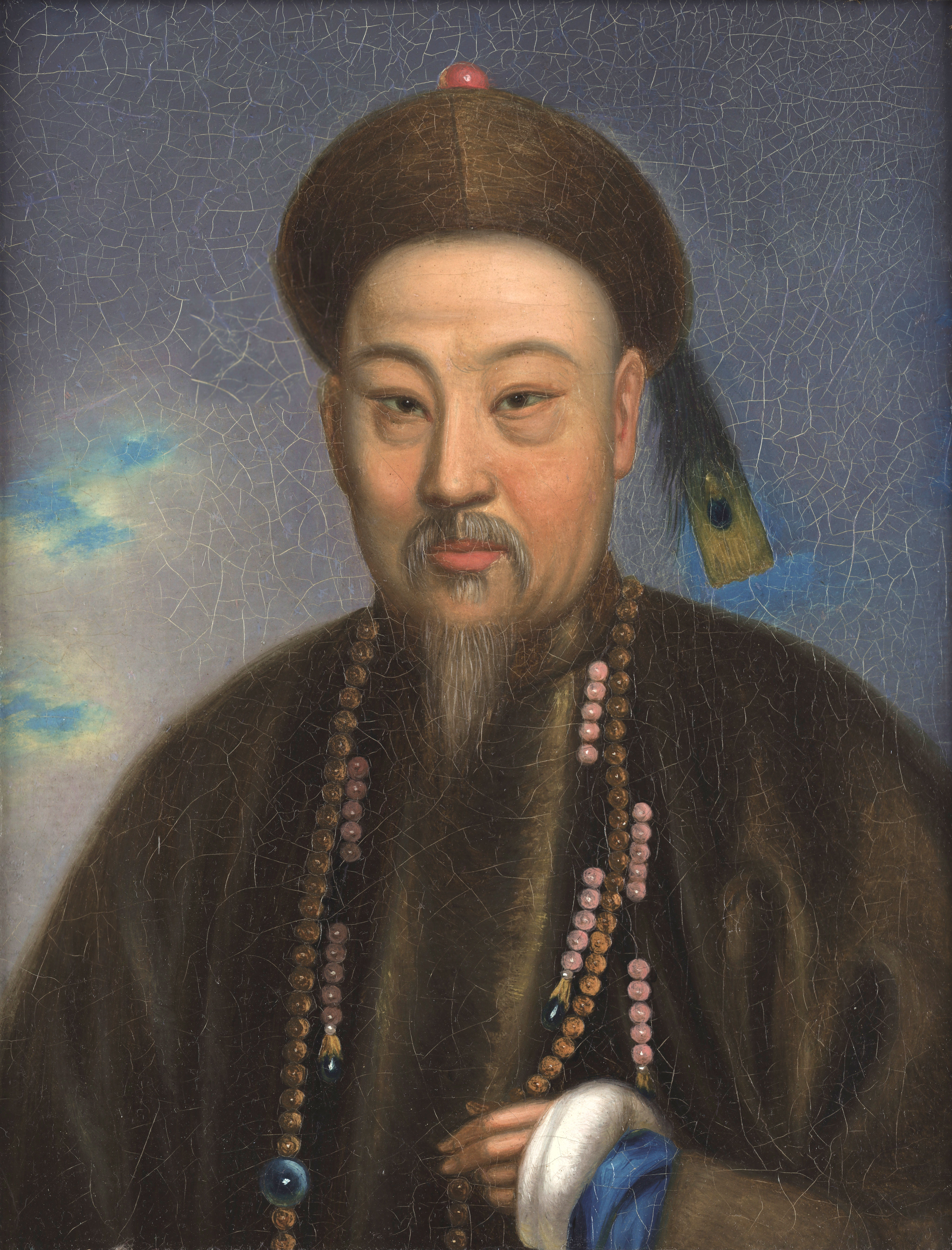
- Portrait of Keying, 1844

Grand Secretary of the Wenyuan Library
- In office 1848–1850

Assistant Grand Secretary
- In office 1845–1847

Viceroy of Liangjiang
- In office 1842–1844
- Preceded by: Niu Jian (acting)
- Succeeded by: Bichang (acting)

Viceroy of Liangguang
- In office 1844–1848
- Preceded by: Qi Gong
- Succeeded by: Xu Guangjin

Minister of Personnel
- In office 30 August 1836 – 7 November 1836 Serving with Tang Jinzhao
- Preceded by: Mujangga
- Succeeded by: Yijing

Minister of Revenue
- In office 25 December 1834 – 30 August 1836 Serving with Wang Ding
- Preceded by: Mujangga
- Succeeded by: Yihao

Minister of Works
- In office 17 August 1834 – 25 December 1834 Serving with Wang Shouhe (until 1834), Shi Zhiyan (1834), Wang Yinzhi (1834)
- Preceded by: Boqitu
- Succeeded by: Jingzheng

Minister of Rites
- In office 15 October 1829 – 17 August 1834 Serving with Tang Jinzhao (until 1830), Wang Yinzhi (1830–1832), Wang Shouhe (since 1832)
- Preceded by: Fuqitu
- Succeeded by: Shengyin

Personal details
- Born: 21 March 1787 Beijing, China
- Died: 29 June 1858 (aged 71) Beijing, China
- Profession: Diplomat, governor

Keying
- Chinese: 耆英
Transcriptions
Standard Mandarin
- Hanyu Pinyin: Qíyīng
- Wade–Giles: Ch'i-ying

Manchu name
- Romanization: Kiyeng

Keying (21 March 1787 – 29 June 1858), Qiying (Hanyu pinyin), or Ch'i-ying (Wade–Giles), was a Manchu statesman and official during the Qing dynasty of China. An imperial clansman of the house of Aisin Gioro, he began his career in the Imperial Clan Court. He conducted several peace treaties with Western powers, beginning with the Treaty of Nanking (alongside Yilibu), which ended the First Opium War with Britain in 1842. Keying was sent to negotiate again in 1858 to settle the Arrow War with Britain and France, but the settlement was repudiated by the Xianfeng Emperor and he was forced to commit suicide.

== Early career ==
Keying was born on 21 March 1787. A descendant of Nurhaci's ninth son Babutai (Duke Kexi of the First Rank), Keying was a member of the imperial house of Aisin Gioro, and belonged to the Manchu Plain Blue Banner in the Eight Banners. He held several prominent posts in the Qing government and was demoted several times because of corruption in office, but managed to regain his position as a leading official in the Qing court.

== Opium Wars ==
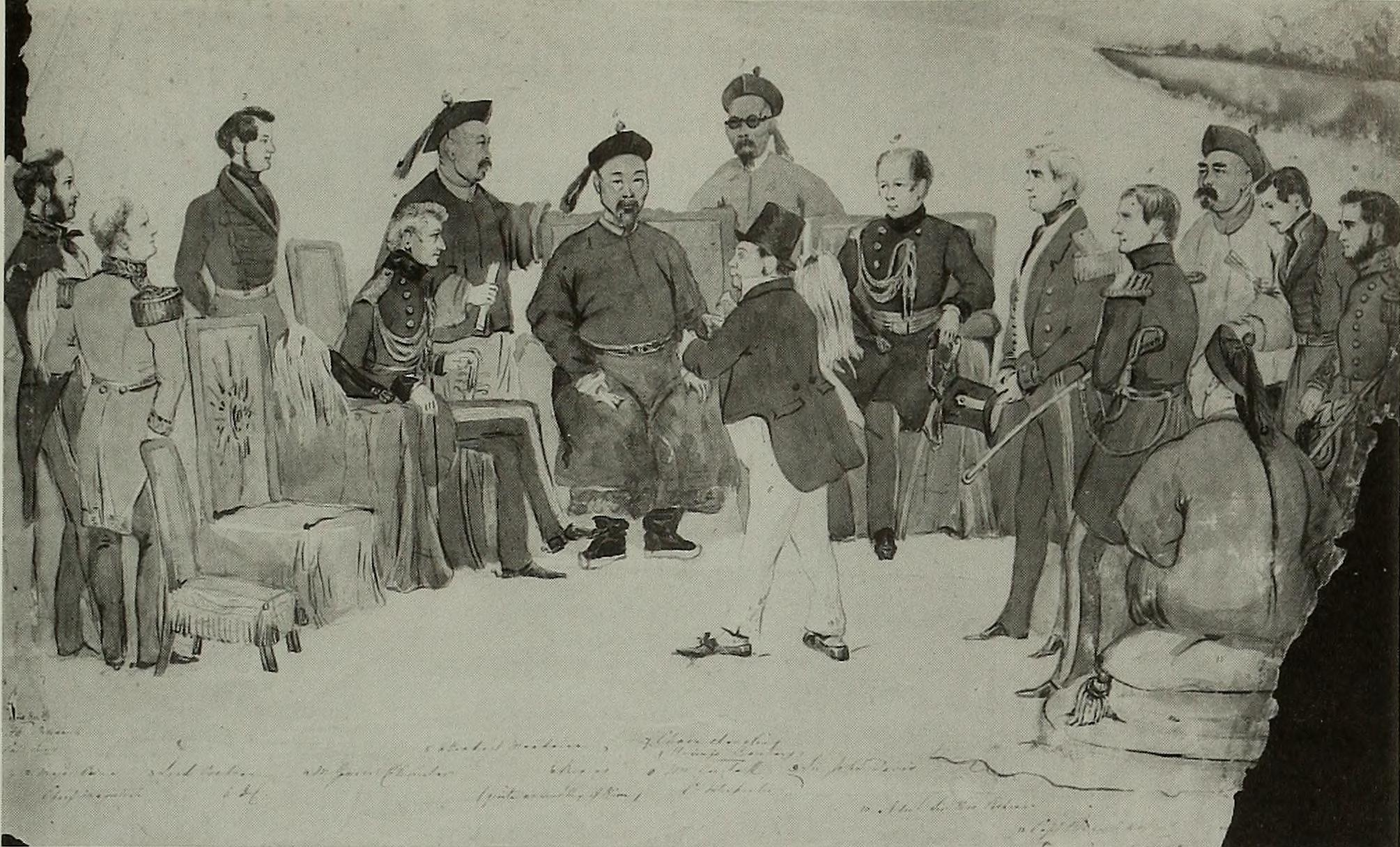
Formal reception of Keying in Hong Kong, November 1845

In 1842, the Daoguang Emperor entrusted Keying to conclude a peace treaty with Britain following the First Opium War, and he was chiefly responsible for negotiating and signing the Treaty of Nanking. The following year, he signed the Treaty of the Bogue to supplement the Treaty of Nanking. He also concluded the Treaty of Wanghia (1844) with the United States, the Treaty of Whampoa (1844) with France, and the Treaty of Canton (1847) with Sweden-Norway. This is the first group of what the Chinese later called the unequal treaties. In November 1845, Keying was well received in Hong Kong.

In 1858, the Xianfeng Emperor ordered Keying to negotiate a peace treaty with Britain and France to conclude the Second Opium War. During the negotiations, the British interpreters Horatio Nelson Lay and Thomas Francis Wade sought to expose Keying's duplicity by producing documents the British had captured in Guangzhou, in which Keying expressed his contempt for the British. Humiliated, Keying promptly left the negotiations in Tianjin for Beijing and he was later arrested for having left his post in contravention of imperial order. He was sentenced to death by the Imperial Clan Court, but was allowed to commit suicide instead.

== Namesakes ==
- Keying, trading junk and the first Chinese ship to sail to Britain and America.
- Keying and Marine House c. 1845, became part of the Hong Kong Hotel in 1866. It was demolished in 1858 and now site of Central Building at Pedder Street and Queen's Road Central.

== Notes ==
Government offices
Preceded by Niu Jian	Viceroy of Liangjiang; 1842–1844	Succeeded by Bichang
Preceded by Qi Gong	Viceroy of Liangguang; 1844–1848	Succeeded by Xu Guangjin
