= Tan Lun =

Ming general and official (1519–1577)

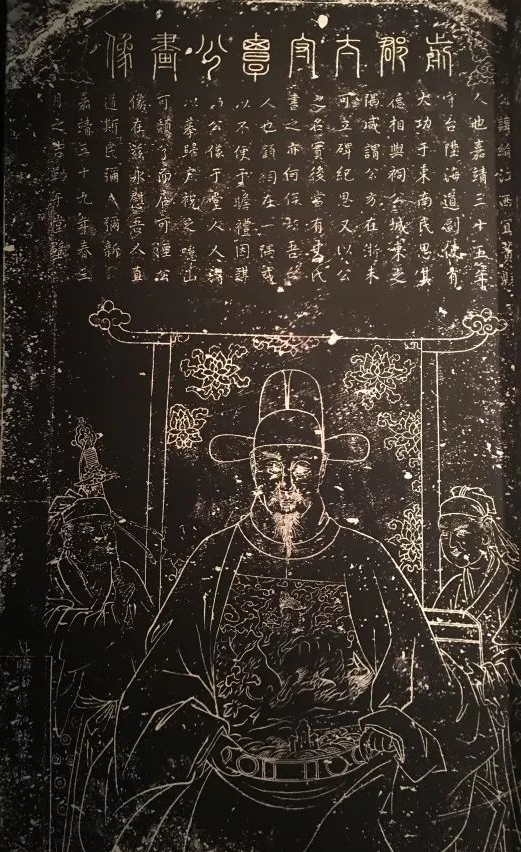

Personal details
- Born: August 4, 1519; Yihuang County, Jiangxi
- Died: April 20, 1577 (aged 57); Beijing
- Occupation: Politician

Tan Lun (Chinese: 譚綸, courtesy name Zili 子理, 以詔; art name Erhua 二華, (August 4, 1519 – April 20, 1577) was a Han Chinese official, military general, of the Jiajing Emperor of mid-Ming Dynasty in China.

Tan Lun raised and organized Qi Jiguang and several other generals to fight effectively against the Jiajing wokou pirates and along with other prominent figures restored the stability of the Ming Dynasty. He was known for his strategic perception, administrative skill, and for consolidating military strength during the middle Ming Dynasty. He was also known for his ruthlessness in the execution of his policies. Tan also exemplified loyalty in an era of chaos. He died in 1577, where he was bestowed the posthumous honour of Grand Guardian of the Heir Apparent (太子太保).

== Popular culture ==
The 1975 King Hu film The Valiant Ones features Tan Lun.

Government offices
Preceded by	Grand Coordinator of Fujian; 1548–1557	Succeeded by
Preceded by (acting)	Supreme Commander of Liangguang; 1564–1568	Succeeded by
Preceded by	Supreme Commander of Ji–Liao; 1567	Succeeded by
Preceded by	Minister of War; 1568–1573	Succeeded by
