= Yilibu =

Chinese official of the Qing dynasty

Ilibu

Assistant Grand Secretary
- In office 1838–1841

Viceroy of Liangjiang
- In office 1840–1841
- Preceded by: Deng Tingzhen
- Succeeded by: Linqing (acting)

Viceroy of Yun-Gui
- In office 1835–1840
- Preceded by: Ruan Yuan
- Succeeded by: Deng Tingzhen

Personal details
- Born: 1772
- Died: 1843 (aged 70–71)

Yilibu
- Chinese: 伊里布
Transcriptions
Standard Mandarin
- Hanyu Pinyin: Yīlǐbù

Yilibu (Manchu: ᡳᠯᡳᠪᡠ Ilibu; Chinese: 伊里布; pinyin: Yīlǐbù; Wade–Giles: I-li-pu; 1772 – 4 March 1843), also spelt Elepoo, was a Chinese official of the Qing dynasty. A Manchu of the Bordered Yellow Banner, he was Viceroy of Liangjiang from 1839 to 1840. In 1842, he assisted in negotiating the Treaty of Nanking, which ended the First Opium War between the United Kingdom and China.

He studied at Guozijian before working his way through the ranks of the then Imperial Government of China.
