= Western influence on Qing dynasty paintings =

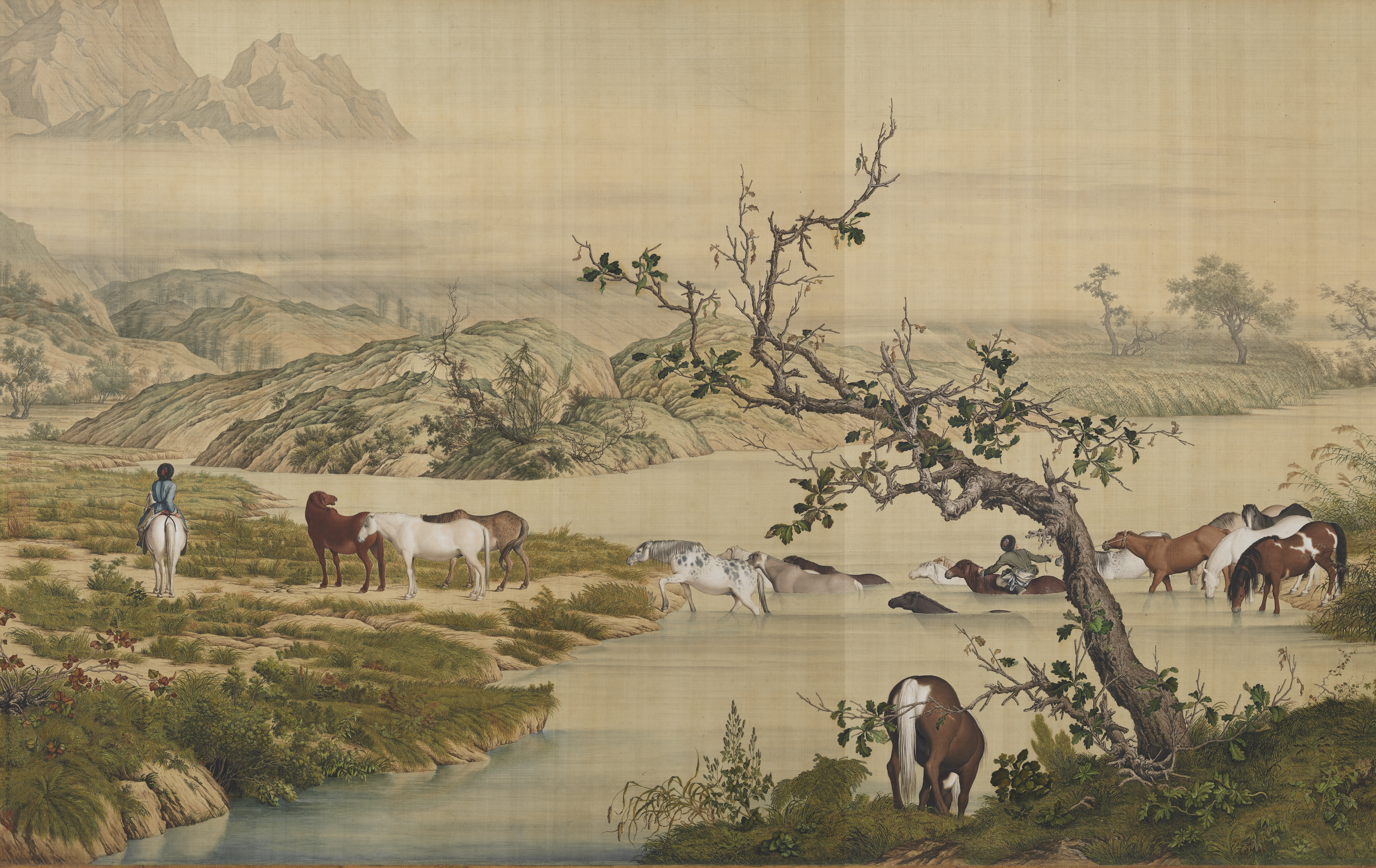
One Hundred Horses by Giuseppe Castiglione

During the Qing dynasty, interactions with the West led to western influences on the paintings of the era, resulting in a style that blended elements of both the East and the West. These influences on Qing dynasty paintings were most prominent during the reigns of the Kangxi, Yongzheng, and Qianlong emperors, following the arrival of Jesuit missionaries to Qing China. These paintings included portrait paintings but were not limited to just portraiture.

== History ==
Western influence on Qing Dynasty art was informed by Qing China’s interactions with the rest of the world from the late 17th century to the 18th century. Jesuit missionaries had been in China since the Ming period. These Jesuit missionaries were trained by the Society of Jesus with the education of knowledge beyond Catholicism, capable of "draw(ing) connections between different branches of their knowledge to be able to analyze and defend their faith.” This education of Jesuit missionaries brought European painting techniques to Qing court. The reign of three emperors in particular - Kangxi, Yongzheng, and Qianlong, saw the rise of Western influence brought by Jesuit missionaries on imperial paintings for Qing emperors.

Jesuit missionaries held a top-down strategy to seek the support of the upper class, especially the emperors, whose support was key to converting in China. Building close relationships with the emperors became a priority of missionaries. While the emperors had little interest in Catholicism, the missionaries applied secular knowledge to gain their favor. The missionaries expertise in various disciplines such as astronomy and cartography enabled them to gain Qing emperors' trust and admiration, avoiding direct discussion of beliefs. Qing emperors showed interest in European painting style and Jesuit missionaries were willing to teach the emperors about their European painting techniques.

Though Yongzheng and Qianlong emperors showed exceptional interest in Western painting styles, Jesuit missionaries’ paintings commissioned by the emperors suggested that their interest would always contain their pride in the Qing empire’s military victories and their ambitious understanding of the world. Western influence on Qing dynasty paintings peaked during the reigns of Yongzheng and Qianlong, rapidly fading as result of the decline of the dynasty. In 1724, the Yongzheng emperor and his successors banned Catholicism in China, though they kept missionaries who provided technical services for them including favored missionary painters such as Giuseppe Castiglione, Louis Antoine de Poirot and Giuseppe Panzi. The consequence of Catholicism’s decline in Qing China was the overthrow of the Society of Jesus in Europe. As the Society of Jesus was abolished in 1773 by the pope, no new missionary painters would come to China and please its emperors.

== Portraiture ==
=== Yongzheng emperor in European attire ===
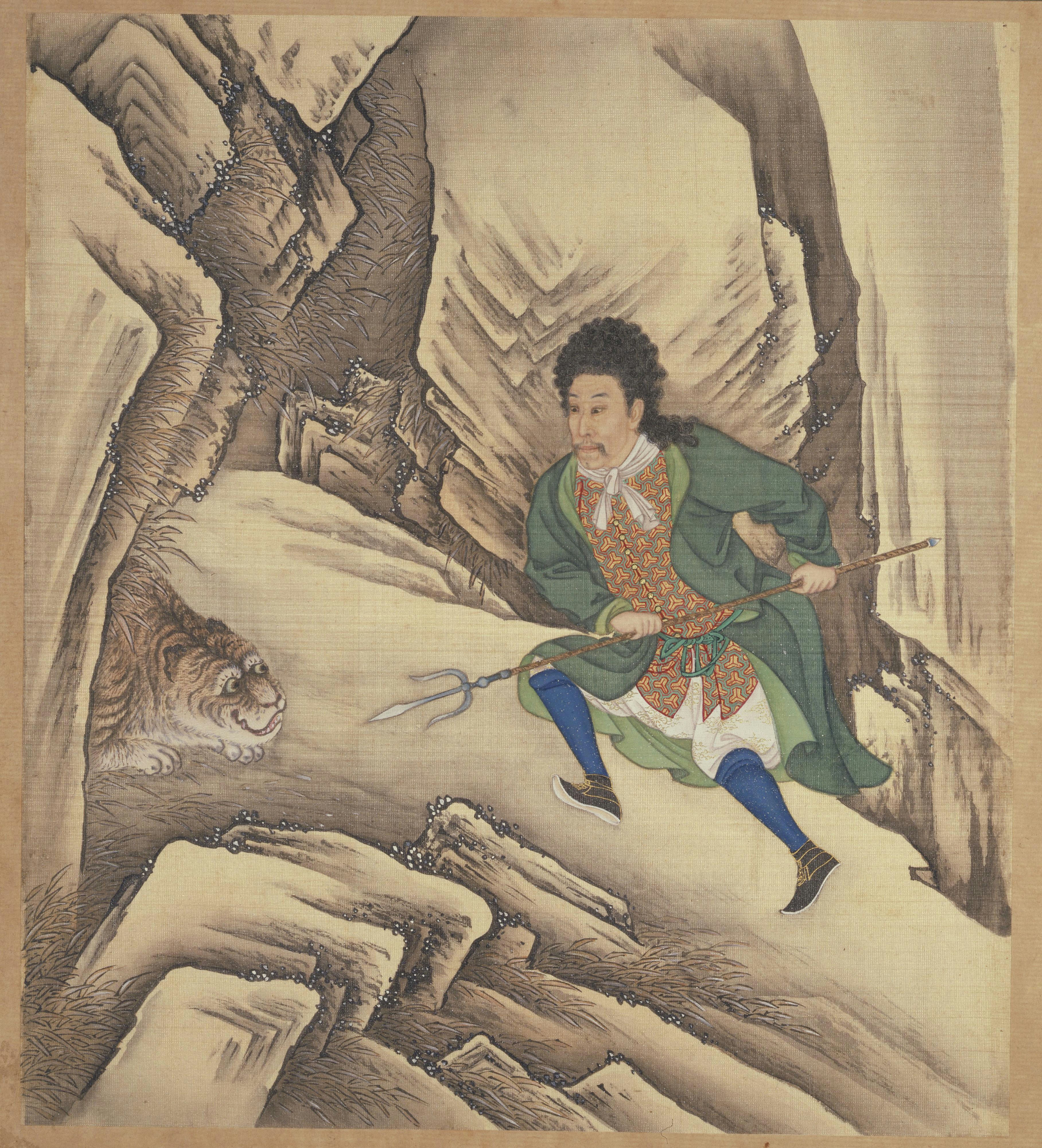
Figure 1. Album of the Yongzheng Emperor in Costumes painted in Yongzheng’s reign

Though skeptical of Catholicism, the Yongzheng emperor showed an interest in Western painting styles. Figure 1 is a portrait of the Yongzheng emperor, when he was a prince, confronting a tiger while wearing European-style attire. The emperor’s nobleman outfit, European wig, and face are portrayed in a Western style. This work is part of a collection that contains thirteen more depictions of the emperor as a European-style scholar, warrior, Buddhist deity, among others.

=== Lang Shining and Qianlong on horseback ===
Giuseppe Castiglione, known by his Chinese name Lang Shining, was an Italian Jesuit missionary and court painter who served the Qing court for over fifty years. Trained in the Baroque tradition, Castiglione brought European techniques such as linear perspective, chiaroscuro, and oil painting to China, merging them with traditional Chinese styles to create a unique artistic synthesis.

His hybrid work led to this new Qing court art style. Figure 2, The Qianlong Emperor in Ceremonial Armor on Horseback, demonstrates this artistic synthesis. Castiglione's approach won significant appreciation from the Qing emperors and symbolized the Jesuit mission of cultural exchange.

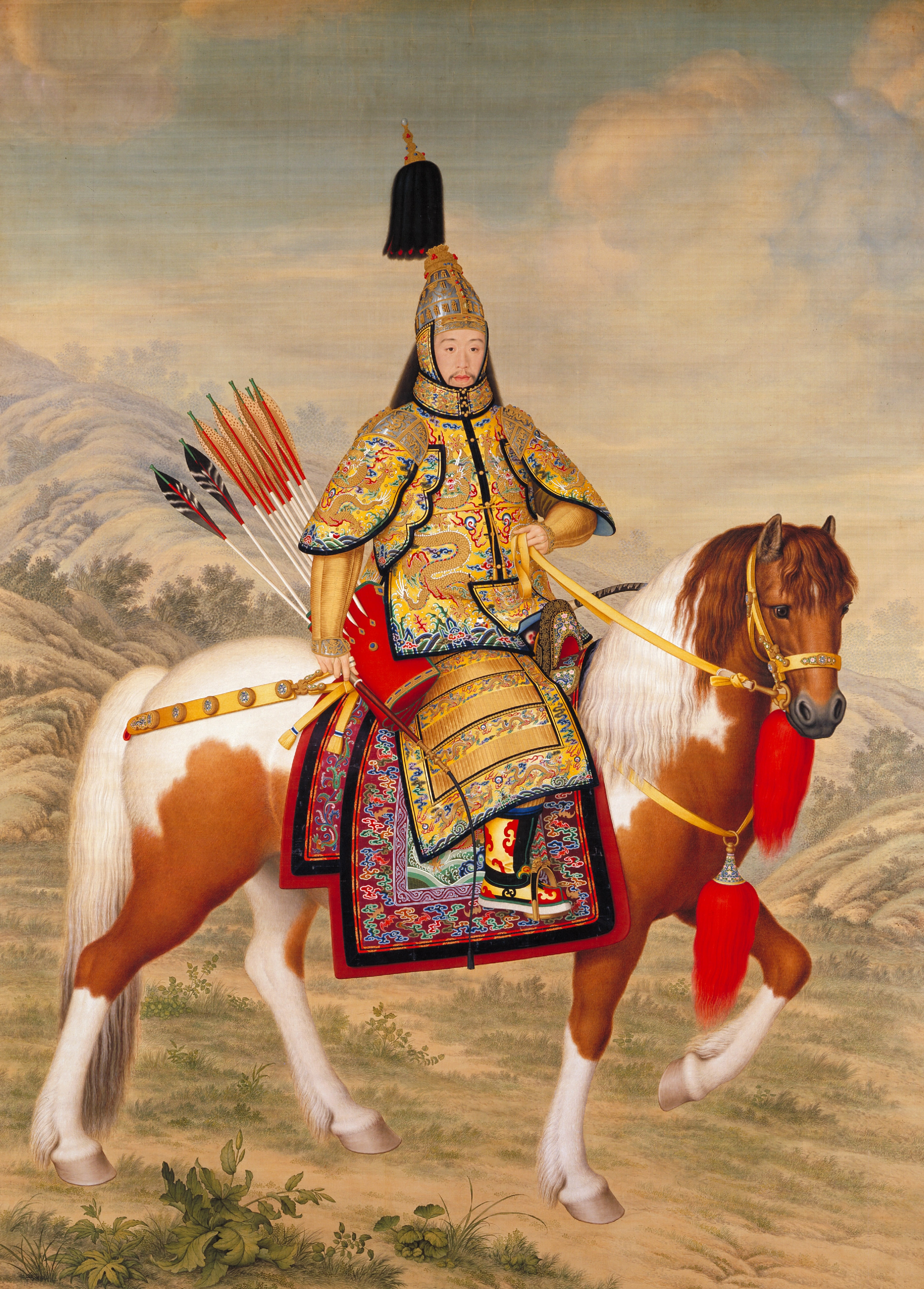
Figure 2. The Qianlong Emperor in Ceremonial Armor on Horseback completed by Guiseppe Castiglione in the Qing dynasty.

The emperor also directly influenced Castiglione’s hybrid art style. He admired the realism of Western paintings, but he rejected elements like heavy shadows and facial unevenness. Castiglione adapted to his aesthetic preferences. This approach fostered balance with the lifelike qualities of Western methods and the elegance and softness valued in Chinese art.

Lang Shining adopted more Chinese methods, including cunfa (皴法), a brushstroke technique for depicting texture. He also began to leave white spaces in the background, a common Chinese painting characteristic. This practice reflected Chinese philosophical concepts of “emptiness” (虚) and "absence" (无). In later works, such as Gathering Auspiciousness (聚瑞图), Lang Shining depicted flowers with detail and arranged overlapping blossoms to create depth. He used fine lines and subtle color gradients to define forms, avoiding heavy shadows and preserving white backgrounds.

Castiglione’s work has faced modern criticism for its ambiguous blend of traditions, described by some as “neither a donkey nor a horse.” Still, his art remains a notable example of cultural adaptation.

He introduced Western techniques such as linear perspective, chiaroscuro, and oil painting to China, and combined them with traditional Chinese painting styles to form a unique artistic complex. His hybrid style also gave rise to a new style of Qing Dynasty court paintings. His masterpiece, The QianLong Emperor in Ceremonial Armor on Horseback, embodies this fusion. The emperor 's aesthetic directly influenced his creation. The emperor appreciated the realism of western painting. However, he rejected elements such as heavy shadows and facial concavity and convexity. Based on this, Lang Shining adjusted his style, achieving a balance between Western realist techniques and the elegance and softness of Chinese art. To better integrate into the context of Chinese art, Lang Shining actively drew on traditional Chinese techniques such as texture strokes and background blank space. The concept of blank space also embodies the connotations of "emptiness" and "nothingness" in Chinese philosophy. His later work, "Gathering Auspiciousness," depicted flowers with fine brushstrokes, created depth through overlapping arrangements, defined forms with soft lines and color gradients, and avoided heavy shadows. Although Lang Shining's works have been criticized in modern times as "neither donkey nor horse" due to the ambiguity of traditional integration, they remain typical examples of cultural adaptation and have also promoted the innovation of Qing Dynasty court paintings, building a bridge for the exchange of Chinese and Western art. art maintains its unique charm, becoming a cultural bridge connecting the past, present, and world.

=== Qianlong Emperor in Buddhist artwork ===
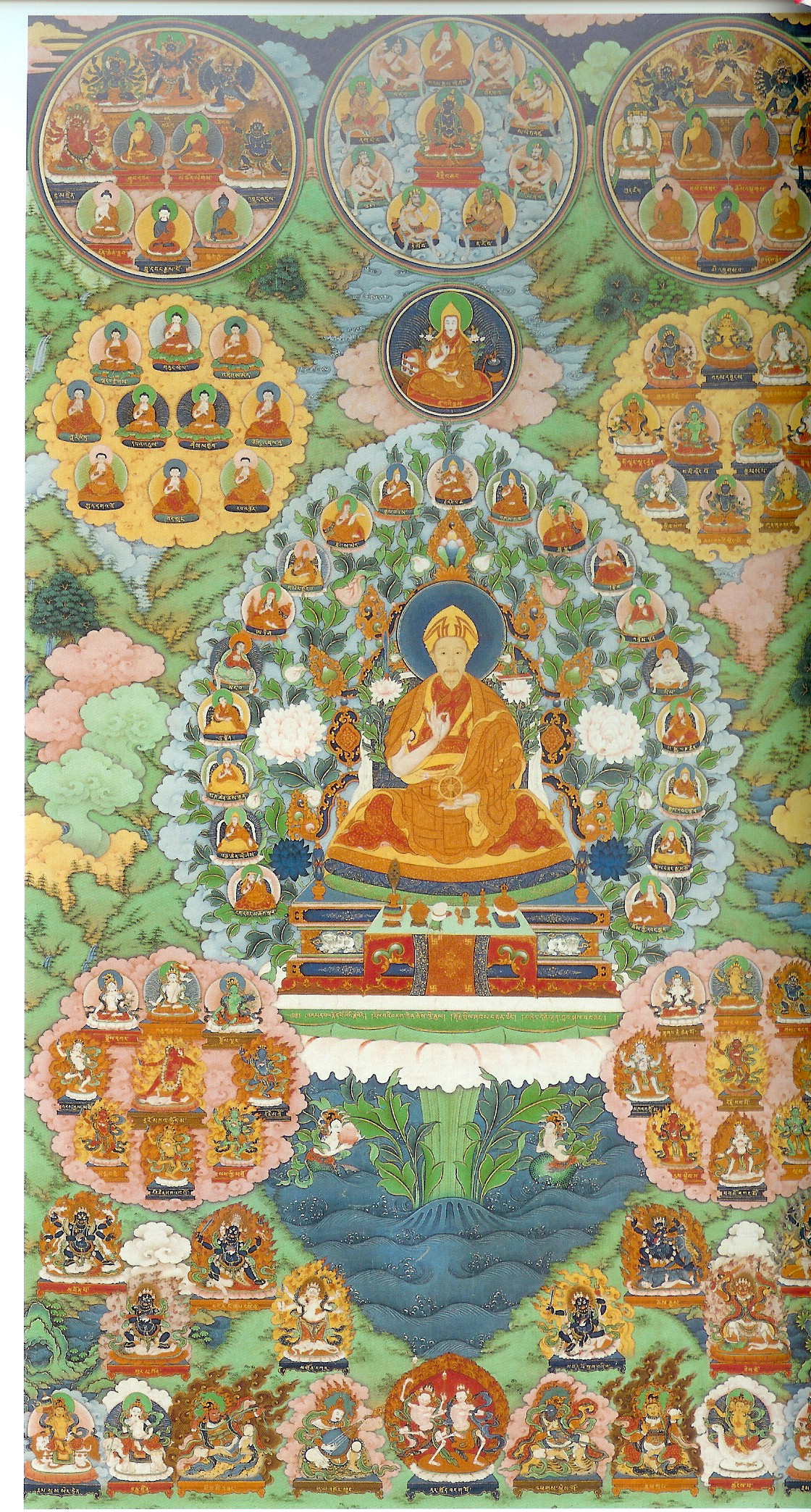
Figure 3. The Qianlong Emperor as Manjushri, the Bodhisattva of Wisdom, was created in the Imperial workshop with the emperor's face painted by Giuseppe Castiglione. Qing dynasty; Ink, color, and gold on silk.

The connection between the emperor and Buddhist figures can be traced back to the Mongol Yuan Dynasty. At this time rulers were associated with the Buddha's universal and transcendent qualities in inscriptions at the Juyong Gate. By the Qing Dynasty, this legacy was adapted by Kangxi, Qianlong's grandfather. Kangxi identified himself with Manjushri in his preface to the Red Kanjur in the early 18th century, where he claimed the association between Manjushri’s manifestation of human form with the empire's history.

Under Qianlong, Buddhist-themed portraiture became a significant medium for asserting imperial authority and spiritual legitimacy over the Tibetan and Mongol peoples. Qianlong’s self-portraits often depicted him as a chakravartin (universal ruler) or as an emanation of Manjushri, the Bodhisattva of Wisdom. These works incorporated Tibetan Buddhist motifs like refuge trees and employed Western techniques to detail the lifelike qualities of the figures.

One example of this. Figure 3, is a thangka featuring Qianlong dressed in Buddhist attire. Qianlong is depicted in a dominant size, surrounded by 108 deities, lamas, and religious figures. Rolpay Dorje, Qianlong's Buddhist teacher, is above the emperor in the second-largest size in the painting with the inscription root lama noted in Tibetan. This position highlights Rolpay Dorje's spiritual significance and Qianlong's role in the Buddhist lineage. The emperor is shown seated with folded legs on a throne, amidst lotus flowers, colorful clouds, and trees believed to represent Wutaishan, the sacred home of Manjushri. Qianlong holds the Buddhist wheel of law in his left hand and forms a mudra, a ritual gesture, with his right fingers, echoing common depictions of Buddhist figures. His face, painted by Castiglione with Western-style shading, creates a contrast with other parts of the painting, which appear flatter. This is symbolic of other Tibetan artists from the Zhongzhendian (Hall of Central Uprightness).

By incorporating this layer of Buddhist art, Qianlong projected an image of the Qing Empire as a cosmopolitan realm. These portraits served multiple purposes: they honored Buddhist traditions, impressed Tibetan and Mongolian allies, and showcased the emperor’s ability to harmonize diverse cultural influences as a "Smooth Lord".

== Non-portraiture ==
=== Zhantu 战图 or depictions of war ===
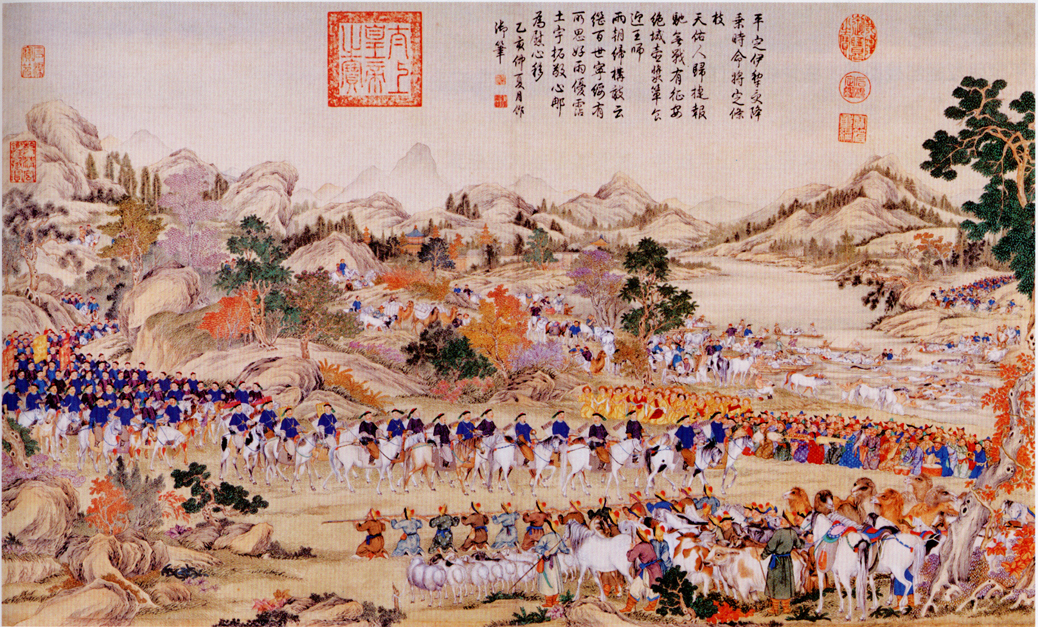
Figure 4. 平定伊犁受降 or Receiving the Surrender of Yili, one of sixteen total scenes making up the Pinging Xiyu Zhantu. Ink on Paper. Qing Dynasty.

Jesuit missionaries also created paintings of successful conquest of new regions to expand the territory of the empire. Zhantu (战图), a term referring to depictions of battle, featured heavily during Emperor Qianlong's reign. To commemorate his many victories on the battlefield, the emperor commissioned many zhantu as documentary paintings.

An example of zhantu artwork is the Pingding Xiyu Zhantu (平定西域战图), which consists of a series of sixteen total war pictures. They were made around 1760 by four missionaries and court painters - Jean Denis Attiret, Giuseppe Castiglione, Ignaz Sichelbarth, and Giovanni Damasceno Salusti. Pingding Xiyu Zhantu roughly translates to “Illustrations of the Campaign to Pacify the Western Regions.” Figure 4 depicts a print of scene 1 from the set.

Qing dynasty zhantu were influenced by European-painted depictions of war like those from France’s Palace of Versailles and Spain’s El Escorial palace-monastery. Though battle paintings have not been consistently popular throughout European history, battle paintings or depictions of victorious battles in Europe predated the emergence of zhantu during Qianlong’s reign.

The original Pingding Xiyu Zhantu hung in the Zi Guang Ge, a pavilion within the imperial park to the west of the Forbidden City. Emperor Qianlong, pleased with the work, later ordered for the series to be made into copper engravings. Copies of the paintings were shipped to Paris on French East India Company Ships. In a postscript in a letter from 27 October 1765, written by Father Augustin de Hallerson, a Portuguese missionary in Beijing, to his brother, Father Augustin de Hallerson, details the commissioning of the copper engravings. The letter was translated from Latin to English by Tanya Szrajber. Part of it details the engravings:

That which I had forgotten in the letter, I here point out. Our Emperor wishes to have engraved, & printed in Europe sixteen images, which represent the operations of the war, which in these past years he waged against the Tartar Eleuths, & their neighbors, & the Mahomedans he had formerly subdued. Indeed, when the war was finished he ordered the painting of 16 large pictures, with which he adorned his halls.

The copper engravings would be displayed in public spaces around the country. Later series of zhantu depicted further military campaigns and battles against groups such as Muslims in Wushi (1765), Gurkhas in Nepal (1792), and indigenous Miao people in Yunnan and Hunan (1790s).
