= Khorgos Port =

Border checkpoint in China

Coordinates: 44°14′N 80°29′E

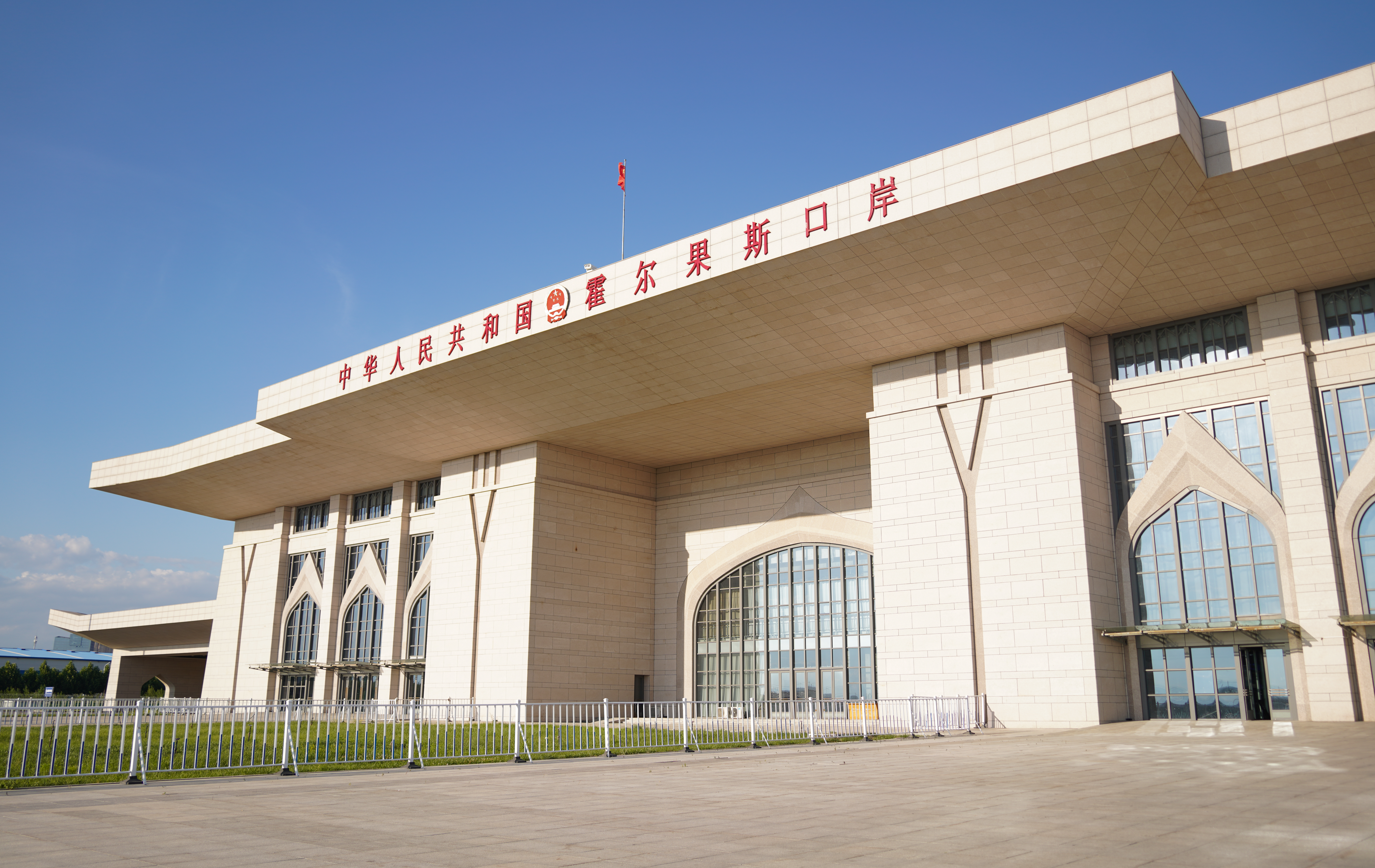
China-Kazakhstan Border Crossing at the New Khorgos Port of Entry, Xinjiang

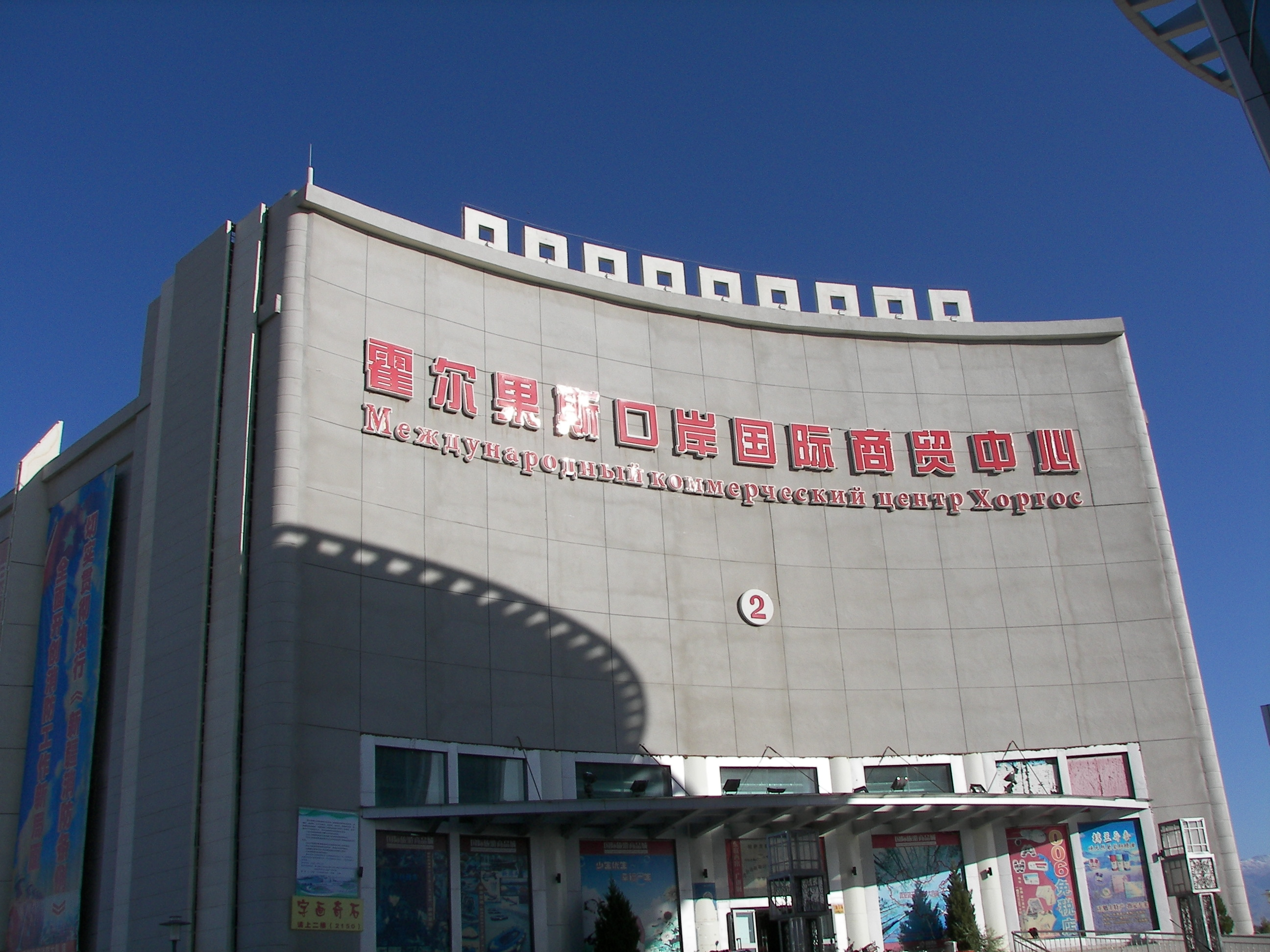
Khorgos Port

Khorgos Port (Chinese: 霍尔果斯口岸) is a dry port situated in Khorgos, Ili Kazakh Autonomous Prefecture, Xinjiang, People's Republic of China, adjacent to the Khorgos River opposite Kazakhstan.The Jinghe–Yining–Khorgos railway, G30 Lianyungang–Khorgas Expressway, China National Highway 312, and the China-Central Asia gas pipeline terminate at this location, while National Highway 218 commences here.

The port was reopened on November 16, 1983, and in August 1992, the governments of the People's Republic of China and Kazakhstan consented to permit access to third countries. In 2002, the port recorded 146,800 passengers, 29,000 cars, and 340,000 tons of commodities imported and exported.

== Khorgos International Centre of Boundary Cooperation ==
The Khorgos International Centre of Boundary Cooperation, situated in the Khorgos Port region, represents the principal initiative of collaboration between the People's Republic of China and Kazakhstan. It is the inaugural cross-border economic and trade cooperation zone established between China and other nations, encompassing a total area of 5.28 square kilometers, with 3.43 square kilometers allocated to the Chinese side and 1.85 square kilometers to the Kazakh side.

Construction commenced in 2006. The center commenced operations in April 2012. The center's functions encompass trade negotiation, commodity exhibition and sales, warehousing and shipping, hospitality services, commercial service facilities, financial services, and the organization of diverse regional international economic and trade fairs.Citizens of the People's Republic of China may enter the center using a Resident Identity Card after obtaining a People's Republic of China Entry and Exit Permit or other valid entry and exit documents. Citizens of Kazakhstan may also enter with valid Kazakhstan entry and exit documents. Citizens of third countries must possess valid entry and exit documents, with a maximum stay of 30 days.

== See also ==
- Khorgos Railway Station
- Ports of entry of China
- Xinjiang Free-Trade Zone
