= Jarkent Mosque =

Central mosque in Jarkent, Kazakhstan

- Жаркент мешіті (Kazakh); Җаркент чинҗынсы (Dungan)
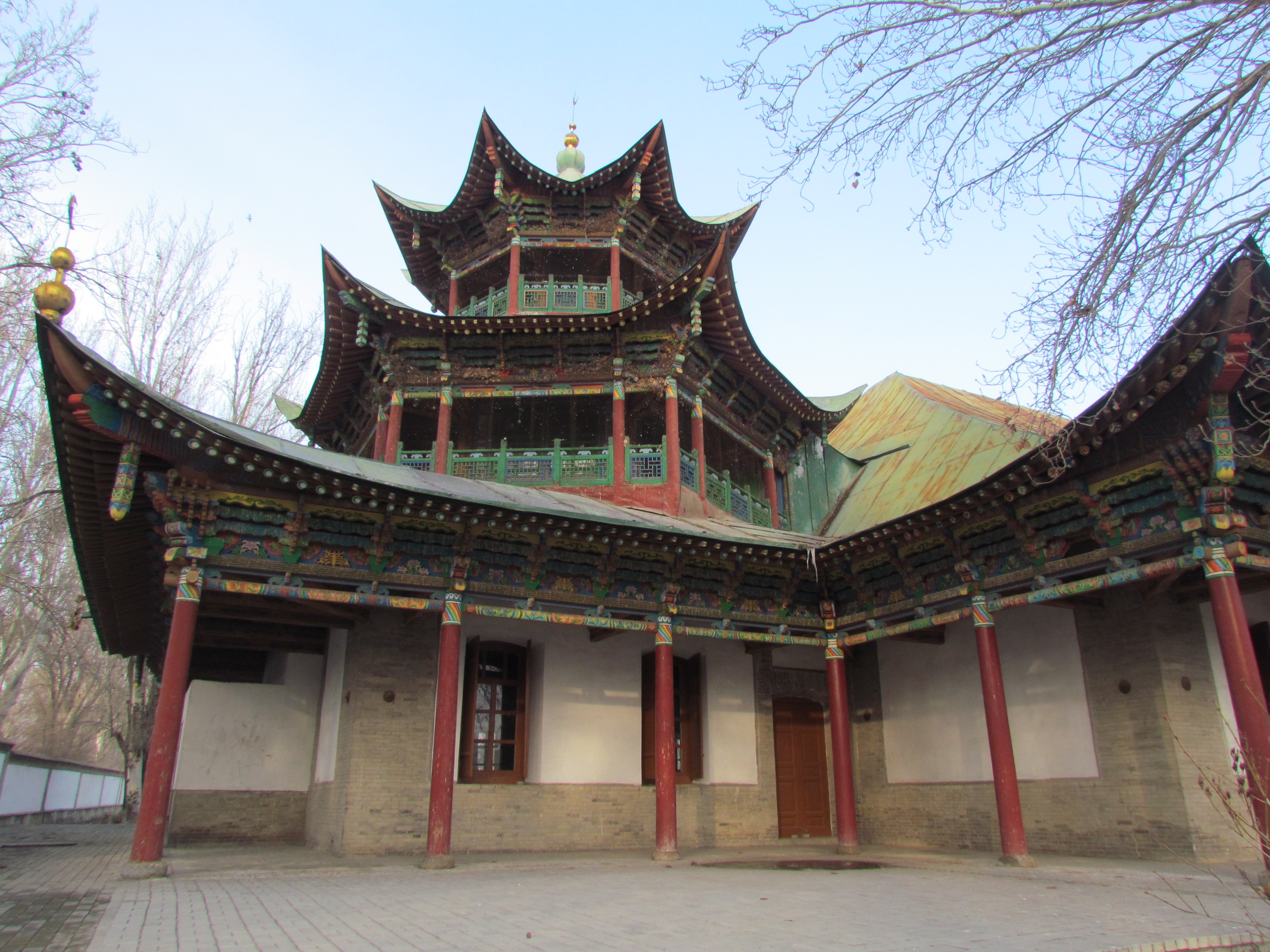

- Location within Kazakhstan

Religion
- District: Panfilov District
- Region: Jetisu Region

Location
- Location: Jarkent, Jetisu, Kazakhstan
- Country: Kazakhstan
- Coordinates: 44.16295°N 80.00034°E

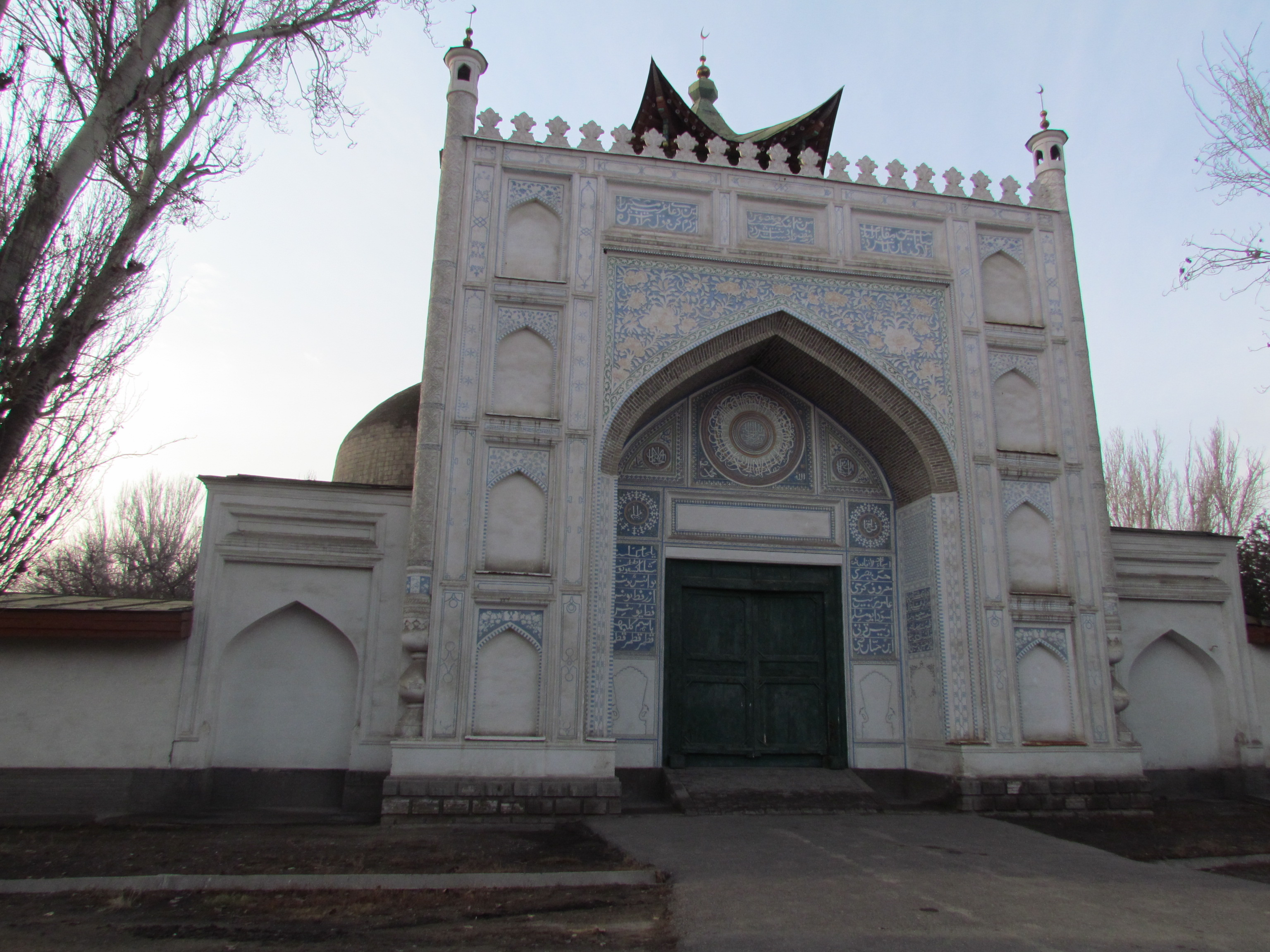
Entrance to the mosque

The Jarkent Mosque (Kazakh: Жаркент мешіті) is the central mosque of Jarkent, Kazakhstan. The mosque was built in 1895 to the design of the Chinese architect Hon Piquet using the collected funds of immigrants. The mosque is under state protection since 1982 as a monument of architecture and history of republican significance.

== History ==
A proposal to build a new mosque was received from the first guild merchant Vali Akhun Yuldashev in 1887 year at a meeting of the Muslim community of Jarkent. He made a down payment and organized the collection of donations from Muslims. The main architect was Chinese master Hon Pike (Mukan), who was assisted by the Uighur masters Hassan Imanov, Ushurbaki, Tair Ismailov, Nasretdin Kara, Zainutdin, Abdukadir and others. A mosque and the main portal entrance with a tower were erected between 1892 and 1895. A small mosque, a madrasah and a fence were built in 1903–1905. In 1910 there was an earthquake, which caused significant damage – both decorative towers collapsed, the tops of the domes fell, through cracks formed in the domes, etc. The mosque was used for various purposes during Soviet rules: there were warehouses, a granary, a barracks for border guards, a cinema and a teahouse. Restoration work was carried out between 1975 and 1978. After reconstruction works an architectural and art museum was opened in the mosque, according to the order of the Council of Ministers of the Kazakh SSR of the 24 March 1978, which was signed by the chairman of the Council of Ministers Baiken Ashimov. The roof and main portal were reconstructed between 2001 and 2004.

== Architecture ==
The mosque was built in the style of Chinese Islamic architecture. The total area of the mosque is 28 × 54 meters. The structure is 14.5 metres (48 ft) tall, and the minaret is 19 metres (62 ft) high. The minaret is surrounded by 52 columns made of Tian Shan spruce. The entablature is decorated with wooden carvings. The walls of the mosque are made of beams, and the roof is made of tin. Nails were not used in the construction of the columns and other wooden parts. The mosque complex is surrounded by a stone wall 2.3 m (7.5 ft) high. There are gates on the south and north sides. A small courtyard is located in the courtyard of the mosque from the north-east side, on the south side is a madrasah. The soaring roof is an influence of Chinese architectural traditions. The roof has slope ends curved to the top, giving the building sophistication and airiness. The mosque has two floors. Cylindrical columns without capitals and with a large cornice form a gallery that encircles the building. The skeleton of the mosque building is formed by 122 wooden posts fastened by a system of beams and nozzles. The highlight of the mosque is the abundance of decor – wood carvings, polychrome paintings in rich colors. They enliven the surface of the arches and walls of the main hall of the mosque. The interior decoration is dominated by plant motifs, Arabic script, elements of the Uyghur ornament. In addition, there are images of birds, fish and animals, including fantastic ones.
