= Panzi (disambiguation) =

"Panzi", born Thom Hansen (born 1953) is an American homosexual activist.

Panzi may also refer to:

- Panzi Hospital, Bukavu, Democratic Republic of the Congo
- Giuseppe Panzi (1734-before 1812), Jesuit painter
