= Yuriy Tskhay =

Kazakh businessman and politician

- Юрий Цхай
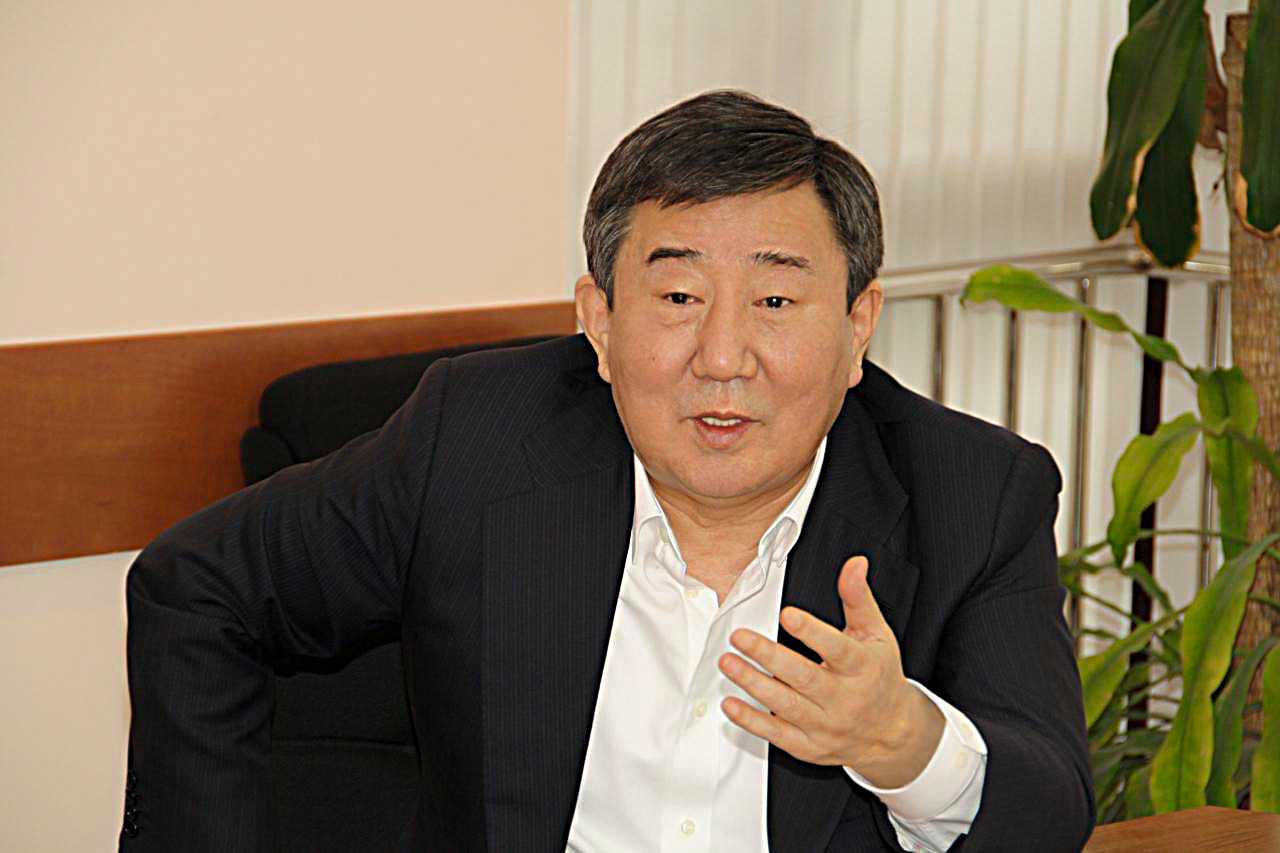
- Tskhay in 2024

Member of the Senate of Kazakhstan
- In office 2007–2013

Personal details
- Born: October 14, 1948 (age 77) Kazakh SSR, Soviet Union
- Occupation: Businessman; politician; boxing coach
- Awards: Order of Parasat; Order of Kurmet; Order of Dostyk (1st and 2nd class); Order of Barys (3rd class); Order of Magnolia (South Korea)

Yuriy Andreyevich Tskhay (Russian: Юрий Андреевич Цхай; also spelled Yuri Tskhay, Yuri Tskhai, Yuri Chae; born 14 October 1948) is a Kazakh businessman, politician, and former boxing coach. He is a former member of the Senate of the Parliament of the Republic of Kazakhstan (4th and 5th convocations) and former boxing coach of the USSR, Kazakhstan and South Korea.

In 2014, Tskhay was included in Forbes list of the 50 most influential businessmen in Kazakhstan.

Member of the Alatau City Development Council.

== Biography ==
Yuriy Tskhay was born into a family of ethnic Koreans. His parents were collective farm workers.

== Coaching career ==
He began boxing in his youth and started his coaching career in 1968 at a youth sports school in the town of Chu, Jambyl Region.

1973-1980 - Boxing coach in Zhambyl.

1980-1990 - Coach of the Kazakh SSR national boxing team.

1981-1990 - Assistant coach of the USSR national boxing team.

1990-1992 - Head coach of the South Korean Olympic boxing team.

During his coaching career, he trained athletes who later became Olympic medalists and world championship winners.

=== Notable trainees include ===
Serik Konakbayev - Honored Master of Sports, Olympic silver medalist (Moscow), World Championship silver medalist, two-time European Champion, two-time World Cup winner.

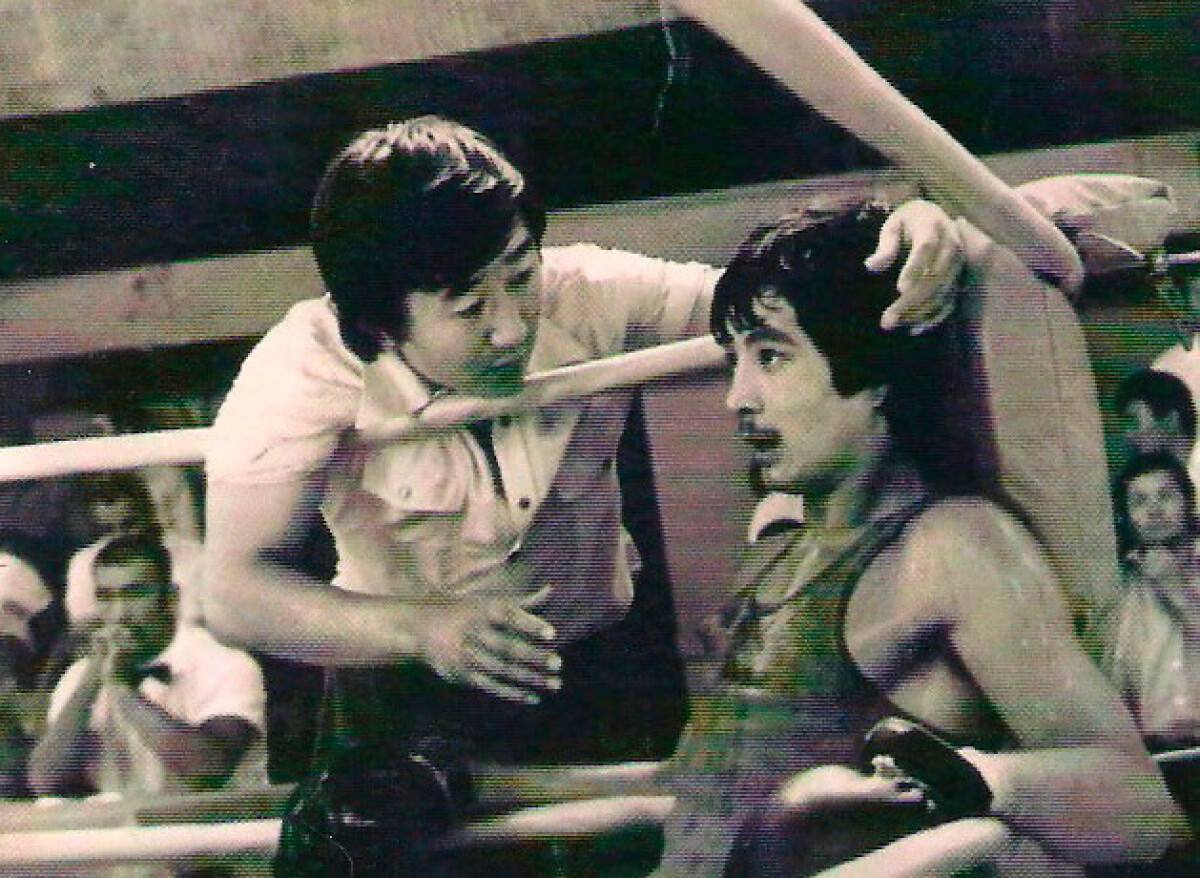
Boxing coach Yuriy Tskhay with his trainee Serik Konakbayev

Karimzhan Abdrakhmanov - International Master of Sports, European Championship bronze medalist, Goodwill Games silver medalist.

Bolat Zhapenov - Finalist at the USSR Peoples’ Spartakiad, USSR Cup winner.

== Business career ==
In the 1990s he founded the Dostar company, which developed business, education and entertainment facilities in Almaty.

2001-2012 - Co-founded Global Pharm, a pharmaceutical plant in partnership with South Korea's Han Seo Pharm. In 2012, Turkey's Abdi İbrahim İlaç Sanayi ve Ticaret A.Ş. acquired a stake in the company, which was subsequently renamed Abdi Ibrahim Global Pharm.

2001-2006 - Shareholder and chairman of the board, Caspian Bank (later renamed Kaspi Bank following a stake purchase by Baring Vostok Capital Partners).

2002-2005 - Shareholder, KUAT Corporation.

2004 - Founded Caspian Group JSC, and since 2014, has served as chairman of the Board.

2006 - Co-founded Seven Rivers Capital with South Korea's Hanwha Securities; sold in 2013 and rebranded as Freedom Finance.

2007 - Founded the Alcas concrete mix plant in Almaty Region.

2007 - Founded Affordable Housing JSC to develop low-rise residential and social facilities in Astana.

2008 - Opened a national boxing training center in Almaty Region to prepare the Kazakh national team for the 2008 Beijing Olympics.

2013 - Founded Evraz Caspian Steel, a rebar production plant in Kostanay.

2014-2021 - Member of the Board of Directors, Allur Group.

2014-2023 - Shareholder, Allur Group. In 2019, his stake was acquired by China National Machinery Industry Corporation (Sinomach).

== Political Activities ==
2007-2013 - Member of the Senate of the Parliament of the Republic of Kazakhstan (4th and 5th convocations), Member of the Finance and Budget Committee, Advisor to the Prime Minister of Kazakhstan on sports.

== Public Activities ==
1995-2007, 2025 - President of the Republican Public Association “Association of Koreans of Kazakhstan” (AKK).

2007–present - chairman of the Board of Trustees of the Association of Koreans of Kazakhstan.

== Alatau Development Project ==
In 2007, Tskhay proposed the creation of four satellite cities (G4 City) between Almaty and Kapshagay (now Konaev). Preparatory work began that year, but the 2008 global crisis and changes to the concept delayed progress. In September 2021, a new G4 City master plan was presented to the President and Government of Kazakhstan, developed by Singapore's Surbana Jurong, giving the project new momentum.

In 2024, the project was officially renamed Alatau City, located in the village of Zhetygen, and granted city status.

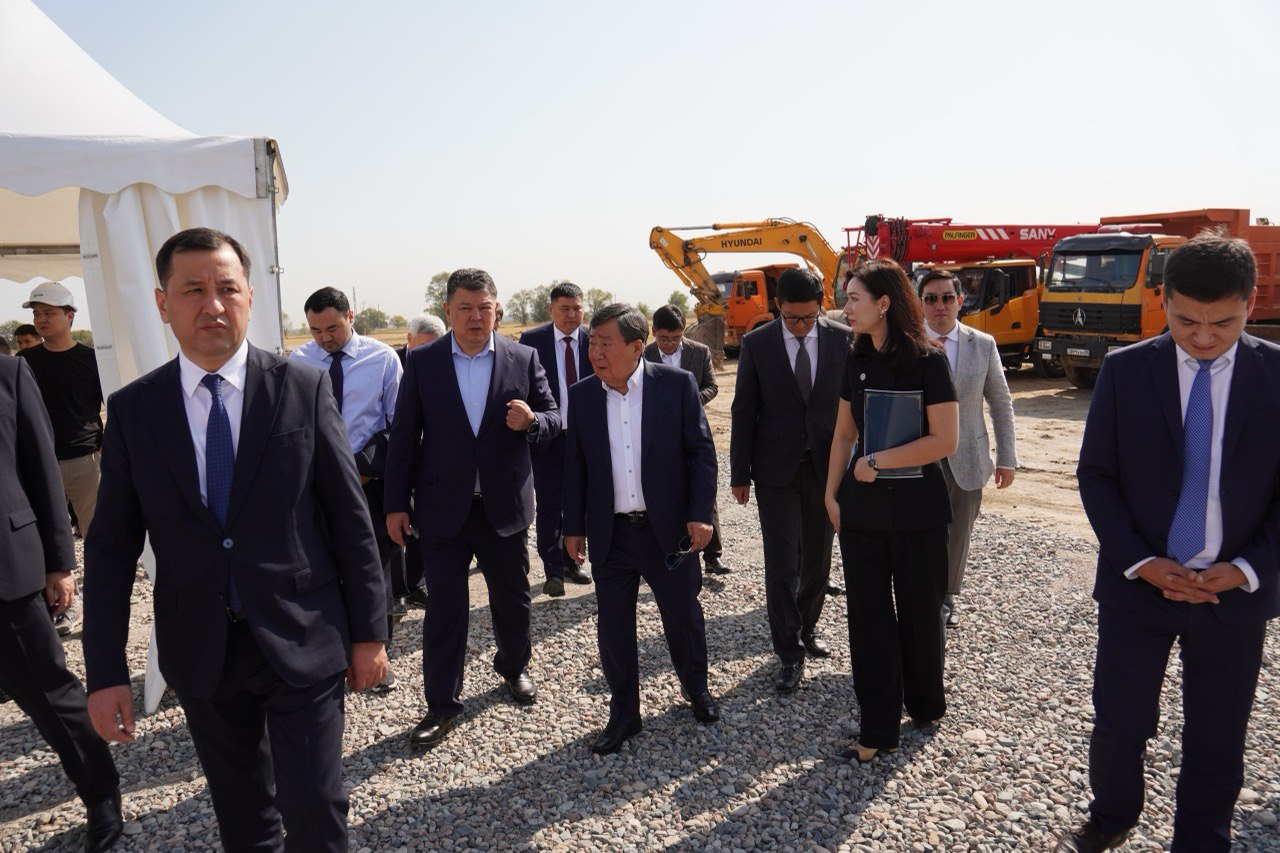
Deputy Prime Minister of Kazakhstan Kanat Bozumbayev and Yuriy Tskhay at the K-Park construction site, September 28, 2025

On 12 September 2025, the first stone was laid for K-Park, a cultural and business center initiated by the Association of Koreans in Kazakhstan.

On September 26, 2025, the President of Kazakhstan, Kassym-Jomart Tokayev, signed the Decree "On Certain Issues Related to the Development of Alatau City", granting Alatau City a special accelerated development status and establishing the Alatau City Development Council. Yuriy Tskhay was appointed as a member of the Council.

== Honors and Titles ==
- Master of Sports
- Honored Coach of the USSR
- Honored Coach of the Kazakh SSR

== Awards ==
For his outstanding contributions to sports, the economy, and interethnic harmony in Kazakhstan, Yuriy Tskhay has been awarded:

=== Orders (Kazakhstan) ===
- Order of Kurmet
- Order of Parasat
- Order of Dostyk (Friendship), 1st and 2nd Class
- Barys (IIIrd Class)

=== Awards from the Republic of Korea ===
- Order of Magnolia
- Medal for Contribution to Korea's Economic Development

He is also the recipient of several state medals of the Republic of Kazakhstan.
