= Nurkent =

- Coordinates: 44°12′49″N 80°13′53″E

Nurkent (Kazakh: Нұркент, Nūrkent) is a town under construction in the Panfilov District of the Almaty Region of south-eastern Kazakhstan, set to be built by 2035 and the projected population of 100,000. The town is located near one of Kazakhstan's two railway crossings on the border with China, at the Chinese city of Khorgos.

In autumn 2016, after a go-ahead from president of Kazakhstan Nursultan Nazarbayev, Kazakhstan's minister of national Economy Kuandyk Bishimbayev announced that Kazakhstan intended to allocate 11.3 billion tenge towards building infrastructure of a new town of Nurkent; it was reported that the construction of the town was seen as instrumental in resettlement of workers of the free economic zone "Khorgos — Eastern Gate", the largest transportation and logistics hub on the New Silk Road. A dry port, a component of the Khorgos — Eastern Gate free economic zone, began to operate in January 2015.

In the summer of 2017, the Chinese state-owned shipping and logistics services supplier company COSCO became the 49 percent owner the land on which the town was being built from scratch.

At the end of 2017, the town was reported to have about 1,200 residents.
