= Altynkol railway station =

Ststion at the border of China and Kazakhstan

Altynkol Алтынкөл

General information
- Location: Khorgas, Panfilov District, Jetisu Region; Kazakhstan
- Coordinates: 44.164717°N 80.295153°E
- Line: Turkestan–Siberia Railway spur line

Other information
- Station code: 707608

History
- Opened: 2011

Services
Preceding station	KTJ	Following station
Iintal towards Zhetygen	Turkestan–Siberia Railway; Zhetygen–Altynkol branch	through to China Railway standard-gauge line
Preceding station	China Railway	Following station
Terminus	Jinghe–Yining–Khorgos railway	Khorgos towards Jinghe
Location

Altynkol Railway Station (Kazakh: Алтынкөл) is located in Khorgas, Panfilov District, Jetisu Region, Kazakhstan, the border of China and Kazakhstan, a spur line railway station of Kazakhstan Temir Zholy.

The Chinese standard gauge is different from the Kazak broad gauge, which means that a break-of-gauge is required in this station.

== See also ==
- Turkestan–Siberia Railway
- Huo'erguosi Railway Station
- Jinghe–Yining–Khorgos railway
