= Khorgos International Centre of Boundary Cooperation =

Joint Kazakh–Chinese zone of trade, economic, tourism and investment cooperation

A traditional-style building in the Chinese part of the centre

The Khorgos International Centre of Boundary Cooperation (Kazakh: «Қорғас» шекара маңы ынтымақтастығы халықаралық орталығы; Russian: Международный центр приграничного сотрудничества «Хоргос»; Chinese: 中哈霍尔果斯国际边境合作中心) is a joint Kazakh–Chinese zone of trade, economic, tourism and investment cooperation on the state border between Kazakhstan and China. The centre consists of a Kazakh part and a Chinese part connected by a special crossing over the border. It lies on both sides of the state border line, directly next to the Korgas (Kazakhstan) and Horgos (China) checkpoints. Citizens of the two countries and of third countries can enter the centre without a visa using a passport or a pass. The centre has been operating since 2012.

It is the first cross-border economic cooperation zone that China has established jointly with another country. Chinese officials call the centre the world's first cross-border free-trade zone. In Kazakhstan the centre is called the country's largest infrastructure investment project in interstate economic cooperation with China.

== History ==
The idea of the centre was put forward jointly in 2003 by the President of Kazakhstan, Nursultan Nazarbayev, and the President of China, Hu Jintao.

The legal basis of the centre consists of:

- the framework agreement between the governments of Kazakhstan and China on establishing the Khorgos International Centre of Boundary Cooperation, concluded in Kulja on 24 September 2004;
- the intergovernmental agreement on regulating the activities of the centre, concluded in Astana on 4 July 2005 and approved by Resolution No. 877 of the Government of Kazakhstan of 25 August 2005.

Hu Jintao and Nazarbayev took the decision to begin construction during the SCO summit held in Astana in 2005. On 25 August 2005, Resolution No. 878 of the Government of Kazakhstan established the wholly state-owned joint-stock company "Khorgos International Centre of Boundary Cooperation". The company was tasked with building and developing the infrastructure of the Kazakh part of the centre and attracting investors to it. By Resolution No. 633 of 30 June 2006, the Government of Kazakhstan approved the concept for the further development of the centre. The concept treated the centre as the initial basic element of an international transcontinental corridor. On the Chinese side, the project was approved by the State Council of China in March 2006, and construction began the same year.

The two sides agreed on and postponed the opening date several times. In the summer of 2011 the administration of the Chinese part expected the centre to begin operating as early as September of that year. On 2 December 2011 a ceremony marking the transition to a customs territory regime was held at the Horgos checkpoint; it was attended by the Vice Premier of the State Council of China, Zhang Dejiang. In April 2012 the centre officially began operating.

In 2014 China's State Council created the county-level city of Horgos around the Chinese part. Chinese investors also put money into the Kazakh part: for example, in 2016 the Golden Eagle Central Plaza (金雕中央广场) shopping complex, built by an entrepreneur from Jiangsu province, opened there. To attract investment to the Kazakh part, a memorandum of cooperation was also signed with the Japanese company Toyota Tsusho.

The Kazakh part received the status of a free (special) economic zone. Next to the centre are a dry port and the Khorgos - Eastern Gate special economic zone, created by a decree of President Nursultan Nazarbayev of 29 November 2011. By a government resolution of 1 July 2025 this zone was re-established. Together they form a complex known as the Khorgos hub.

The centre was closed during the COVID-19 pandemic. After a three-year shutdown it was relaunched in April 2023. On 21–22 December 2023 a meeting of the heads of the border customs authorities of Kazakhstan and China was held on the centre's territory.

A mechanism for coordinating the centre's activities was set up between Kazakhstan's Jetisu Region and China's Xinjiang Uyghur Autonomous Region. The first regional-level meeting of the mechanism was held in the Chinese part of the centre. At the meeting a memorandum on jointly creating the Khorgos cross-border tourism zone was signed.

On 7 September 2026, in Beijing, the governments of Kazakhstan and China signed an agreement on ensuring security and public order on the centre's territory. According to the Ministry of Internal Affairs, the document completed long-running joint work on creating legal mechanisms for ensuring security on the centre's territory. In October 2026 a bill to ratify the agreement was prepared.

== Layout ==
The centre lies along the border Khorgos River, on both sides of the border. At its opening it covered 5.28 km²: 3.43 km² on the Chinese side and 1.85 km² on the Kazakh side. Later Chinese sources give an area of 5.6 km², the Kazakh part having grown to 2.17 km².

The Kazakh part is located in Panfilov District (until 2022 the district was part of Almaty Region, and since 2022 it has been part of Jetisu Region), while the Chinese part is in the Ili Kazakh Autonomous Prefecture of the Xinjiang Uyghur Autonomous Region. Although the parts are directly connected, each has its own entrance and its own border and customs controls. Inside the centre people, goods and vehicles move freely. Visitors may stay in the centre without a visa for up to 30 days. Chinese citizens are issued a single-use pass to enter the centre. An automated border-control system has been introduced at the checkpoint on the Kazakh side, with which document processing takes about ten seconds.

The centre is located on the Almaty–Khorgos section of the Western Europe - Western China international transport corridor. Next to it is the Khorgos railway checkpoint, opened on 22 December 2012.

Since 2005 the Kazakh part has been developed by the joint-stock company "Khorgos International Centre of Boundary Cooperation". The Chinese part is managed by the centre's administration under the Horgos Economic Development Zone.

== Activities ==
The main function of the centre is duty-free retail and small-scale wholesale trade. Apart from trade, the centre is intended for business negotiations, exhibitions, storage and transport of goods, financial services and international forums. Education and medicine were later added to its functions.

A shopper from China returning from the centre may bring in up to 8,000 yuan worth of goods per day duty-free. For citizens of Kazakhstan, the duty-free limit in 2018 was 1,500 euros.

In 2018 the centre had 75 duty-free shops. By 2023 the Chinese part had more than 3,500 traders selling about a thousand kinds of goods from more than ten countries. In 2025 the shopping centres offered goods from more than 40 countries. The Chinese side had more than 2,000 retail outlets and over 200 duty-free businesses. According to Kazakh figures, more than one million people visit the centre each year.
