= Aydarly =

Aydarly Айдарлы
- Village
- Location in Kazakhstan
- Coordinates: 44°2′0″N 79°30′59″E
- Country: Kazakhstan
- Region: Jetisu Region
- District: Panfilov District

Population (2009)
  - Total: 1,477
- Time zone: UTC+6 (Omsk Time)
- Postal code: 041306
- Area code: 72831

Aydarly (Kazakh: Айдарлы, Aidarly) is a village in Jetisu Region of south-eastern Kazakhstan.
