= Basqynshy =

Basqynshy Басқұншы
- Village
- Location in Kazakhstan
- Coordinates: 44°20′14″N 80°22′35″E
- Country: Kazakhstan
- Region: Almaty Region
- District: Panfilov District

Population (2009)
  - Total: 1,725
- Time zone: UTC+6 (Omsk Time)
- Postal code: 041309
- Area code: 72831

Basqynshy (Kazakh: Басқұншы, Basqünşy) is a village in Almaty Region of south-eastern Kazakhstan.
