= Jinghe–Yining–Khorgos railway =

Railway line in China

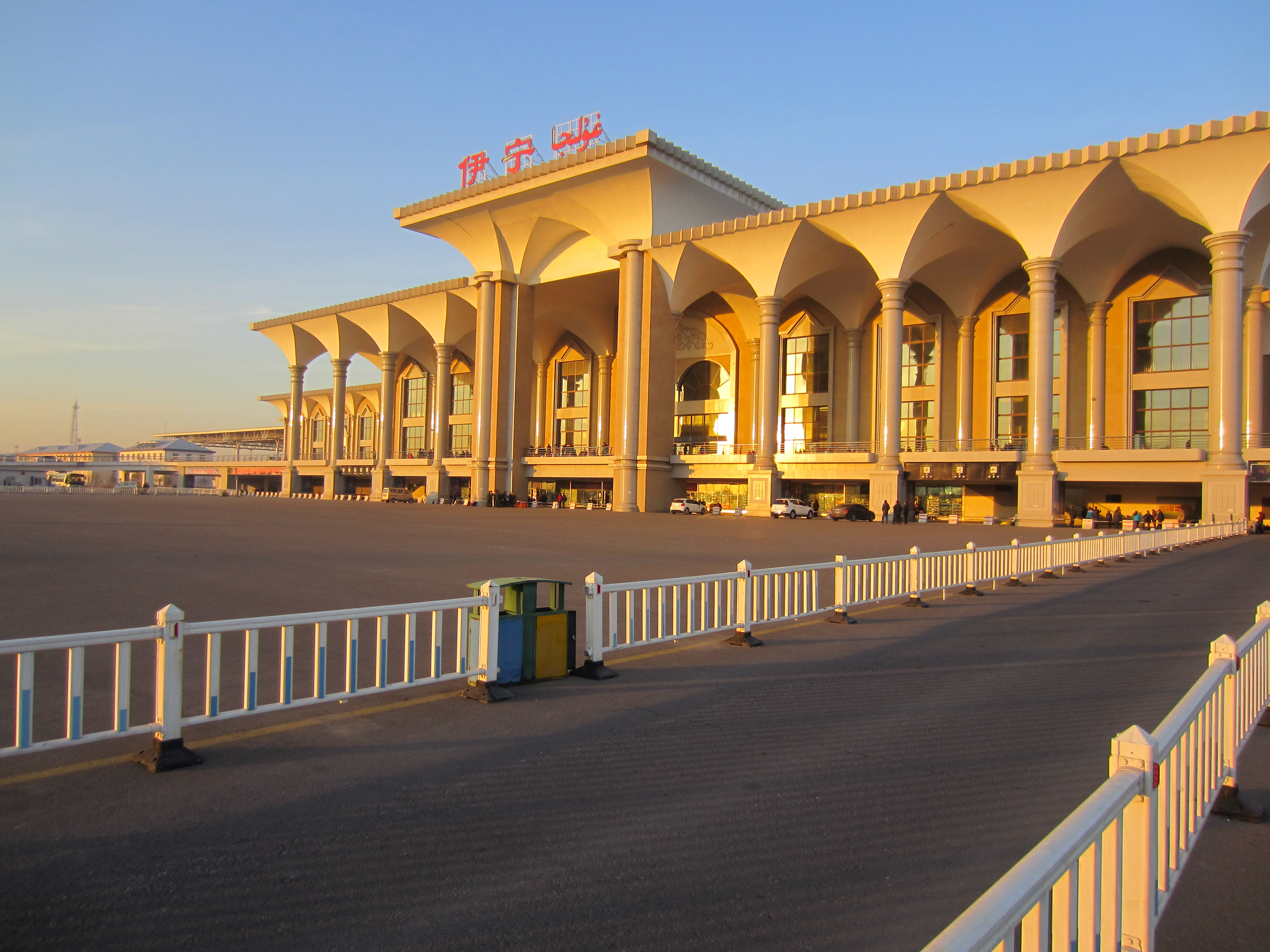
Yining train station

The Jingyihuo railway (Chinese: 精伊霍铁路; pinyin: Jīng yī huò tiělù), short for Jinghe–Yining–Khorgas railway, is the first electrified railway in operation in Xinjiang, China. The line is 286 km in length and connects Jinghe, Yining and Khorgos. The Jingyihuo railway branches from the Northern Xinjiang railway at Jinghe in the Junggar Basin and heads south through the Tian Shan range into the Ili River Valley. Cities and towns along route include Jinghe, Nilka County, Yining County, Yining, Huocheng County and Khorgos, on the border with Kazakhstan.

The line opened to trial operation in December 2009. Passenger train service to the Yining railway station (43°58′00″N 81°16′30″E) began in July 2010. One of the three daily Ürümqi-Yining passenger trains (all running overnight) was extended to Khorgos in December 2013.

On its way from the Dzungarian Basin (where the Northern Xinjiang railway runs) to the Ili Valley (where Yining is), the railway crosses the Borohoro Mountain Range (one of the ranges of the Tian Shan) in the 13-km long North Tianshan Tunnel (Chinese: 北天山隧道; pinyin: Běi tiānshān suìdào).

The Jinghe–Yining section is electrified.

== Connections ==
In December 2011, a 293-km railway on the Kazakhstan side of the border connected the Khorgos border crossing to Zhetigen terminal (near Almaty). A regular passenger service between Almaty and the Altynkol railway station on the Kazakh side of the border opposite Khorgos opened in September 2012.

The railway border crossing (freight port of entry) at Khorgos became operational in December 2012.
