= Louis Antoine de Poirot =

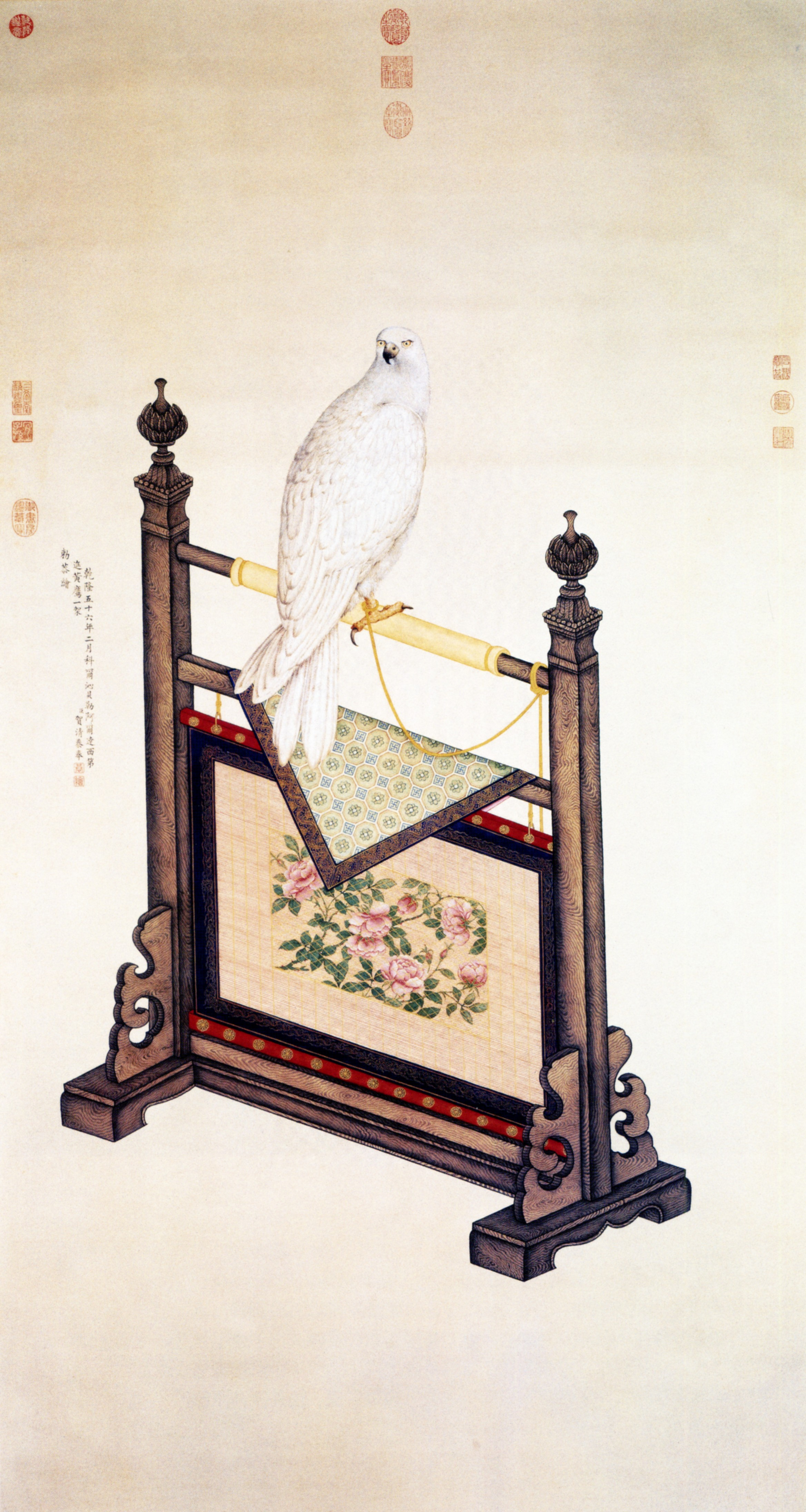
Louis Antoine de Poirot, Falcon 畫黃鷹. Ink and color on silk. Width 95 cm, Height 176.6 cm. National Palace Museum

Louis Antoine de Poirot (French: [lwi ɑ̃twan də pwaʁo]; 1735–1813) was a Jesuit painter and translator of the 18th and early 19th century, who worked in the service of the Qianlong Emperor of China. He adopted the Chinese name He Qingtai (賀清泰). He was the last of the Western painters who worked for the Qianlong Emperor, together with Father Giuseppe Panzi. The two painters replaced the more famous father Giuseppe Castiglione and Jean-Denis Attiret.

Poirot also made a translation of the Old Testament in the Manchu language, and a translation of the New Testament into the Chinese language. He was also in charge of the translations between Latin and Manchu for the diplomatic correspondence between Beijing and Saint Petersburg (Russia).

== See also ==
- Jesuit China missions
