= Jarkent =

Jarkent Жаркент (Kazakh) Джаркент (Russian) 扎爾肯特/扎尔肯特 (Chinese)
- City
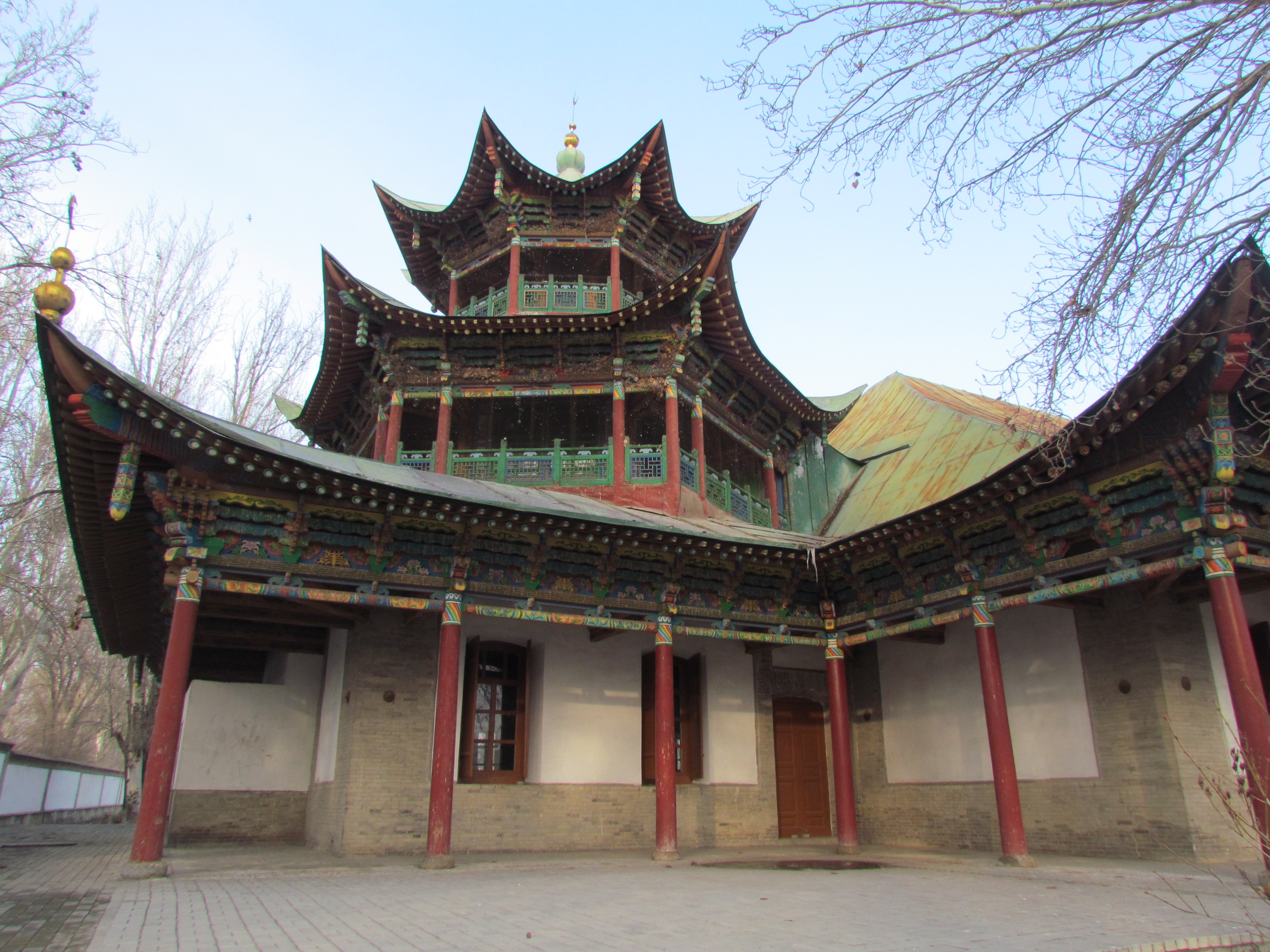
- Jarkent Mosque

- Location within Kazakhstan
- Coordinates: 44°10′N 80°0′E
- Country: Kazakhstan
- Region: Jetisu Region
- District: Panfilov District

Government
  - Akim: Sagymbek Marat Rahymberdievich

Population (2019)
  - Total: 42,617
- Time zone: UTC+05:00 (Kazakhstan Time)
- Postal codes: 041300-041305
- Area code: +7 72831

Jarkent (/dʒɑːrˈkɛnt/; Kazakh: [dʒɑrˈkʲent]) is a city which serves as the administrative center of Panfilov District in Jetisu Region, southeastern Kazakhstan. It is located near the Usek River, not far from the Ili River. It is also right by the border with Xinjiang, China. The city's population totaled 42,617 as of 2019.

The town was founded in 1882. From 1942 to 1991 it was named Panfilov (Russian: Панфилов) after Ivan Panfilov, a Soviet Russian general who died in 1941, during the Battle of Moscow of World War II. Jarkent is well known for its 19th-century mosque, commissioned by a wealthy merchant and community leader named Vali Bay. It is notable for its unique mix of Chinese and Central Asian architectural styles, due to the territory briefly being administered under Qing rule.

== Climate ==
Jarkent has a cold semi-arid climate (Köppen BSk) with hot summers and cold winters.

Climate data for Jarkent (1991–2020, extremes 1917–present)
Month	Jan	Feb	Mar	Apr	May	Jun	Jul	Aug	Sep	Oct	Nov	Dec	Year
Record high °C (°F)	13.7 (56.7)	20.0 (68.0)	29.6 (85.3)	35.5 (95.9)	39.6 (103.3)	40.9 (105.6)	42.1 (107.8)	41.4 (106.5)	39.0 (102.2)	32.3 (90.1)	25.2 (77.4)	16.6 (61.9)	42.1 (107.8)
Mean daily maximum °C (°F)	−0.8 (30.6)	2.7 (36.9)	12.0 (53.6)	21.0 (69.8)	26.2 (79.2)	30.2 (86.4)	32.1 (89.8)	31.3 (88.3)	26.6 (79.9)	18.9 (66.0)	9.1 (48.4)	1.5 (34.7)	17.6 (63.7)
Daily mean °C (°F)	−7.0 (19.4)	−3.2 (26.2)	5.7 (42.3)	13.8 (56.8)	18.9 (66.0)	23.0 (73.4)	24.7 (76.5)	23.4 (74.1)	18.3 (64.9)	11.0 (51.8)	2.7 (36.9)	−4.2 (24.4)	10.6 (51.1)
Mean daily minimum °C (°F)	−11.7 (10.9)	−7.9 (17.8)	0.1 (32.2)	7.0 (44.6)	11.9 (53.4)	16.2 (61.2)	17.8 (64.0)	16.0 (60.8)	10.9 (51.6)	4.7 (40.5)	−1.9 (28.6)	−8.4 (16.9)	4.6 (40.3)
Record low °C (°F)	−40.6 (−41.1)	−42.3 (−44.1)	−28.0 (−18.4)	−9.4 (15.1)	−8.7 (16.3)	2.1 (35.8)	6.1 (43.0)	4.9 (40.8)	−5.0 (23.0)	−12.3 (9.9)	−36.5 (−33.7)	−35.8 (−32.4)	−42.3 (−44.1)
Average precipitation mm (inches)	12.4 (0.49)	14.1 (0.56)	13.1 (0.52)	21.3 (0.84)	19.1 (0.75)	23.8 (0.94)	23.3 (0.92)	15.7 (0.62)	11.5 (0.45)	15.6 (0.61)	19.8 (0.78)	12.4 (0.49)	202.1 (7.96)
Average precipitation days (≥ 1.0 mm)	3.4	3.4	3.4	3.7	4.2	4.8	4.9	3.0	2.2	3.0	4.0	3.6	43.6
Mean monthly sunshine hours	139.8	148.0	205.2	240.3	290.6	299.8	318.1	303.8	263.2	223.4	149.8	117.7	2,699.7
Source 1: Pogoda.ru.net
Source 2: NOAA

== Demographics ==
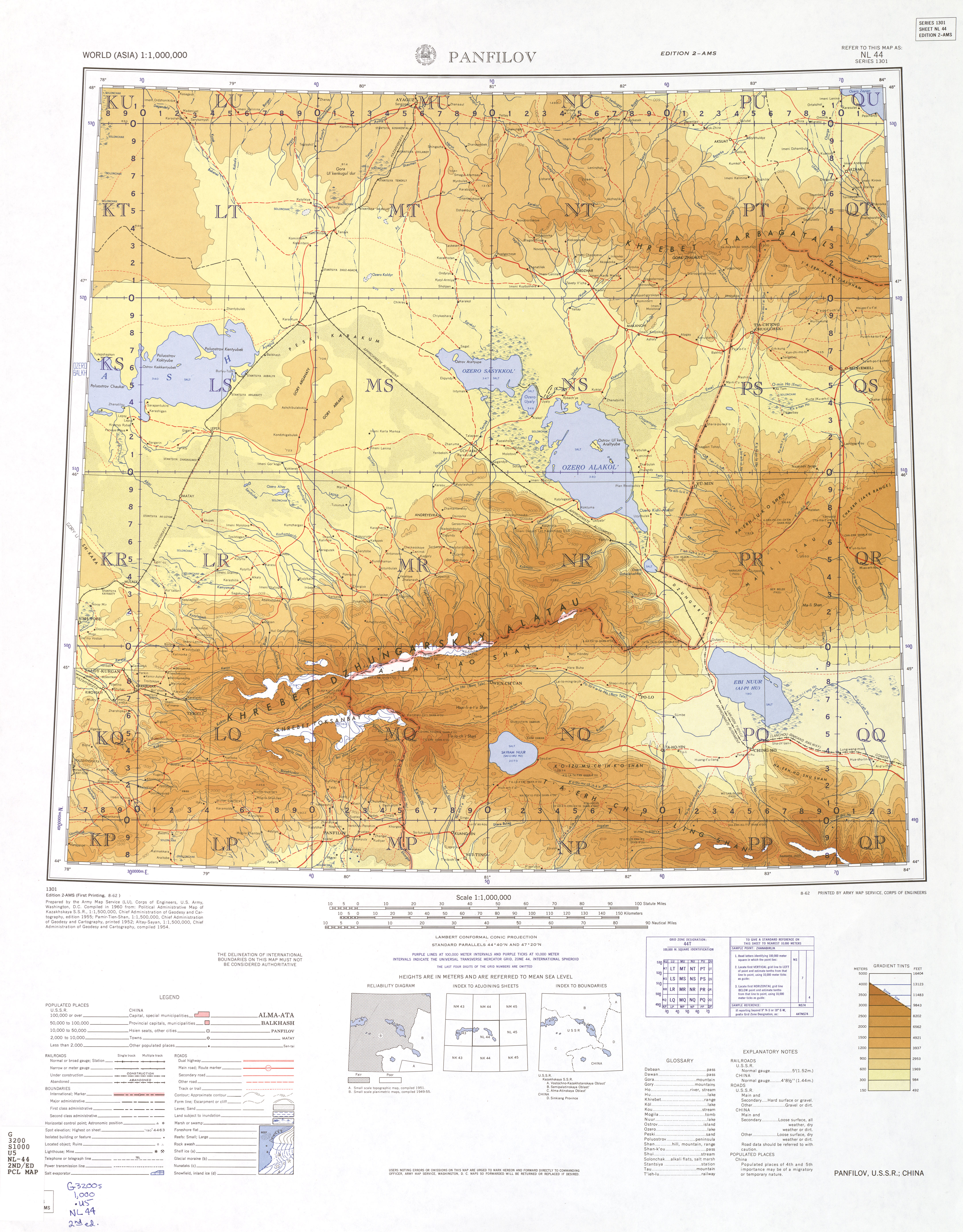
Map of Jarkent (labeled as PANFILOV) and surrounding area from the International Map of the World (1960)

The city's population stood at 42,617 as of 2019; 33,350 (2009 census results);and 32,656 (1999 census results).
