= Khorgos =

County-level city in Xinjiang, China

Khorgos: 霍尔果斯市 (Chinese); قورغاس شەھىرى (Uyghur); قورعاس قالاسى (Kazakh); Horgos, Korgas, Khorgas
- County-level city
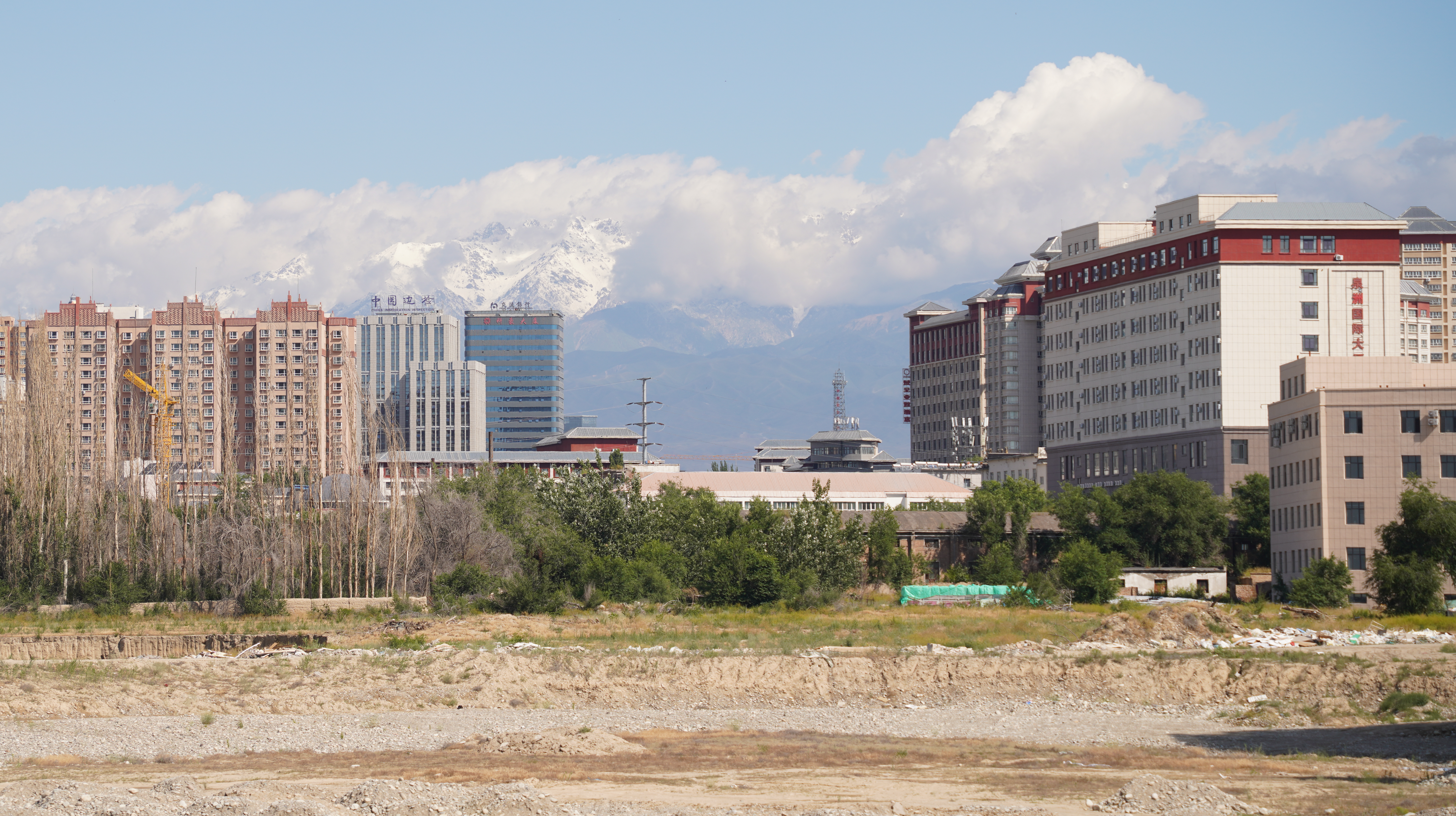
- Downtown Khorgos, with the Dzungarian Alatau visible in the background

- Location in Xinjiang Khorgos (Xinjiang) Khorgos (China)
- Coordinates: 44°12′45″N 80°24′35″E
- Country: China
- Autonomous region: Xinjiang
- Autonomous prefecture: Ili
- Municipal seat: Qarasu Subdistrict

Area
  - Total: 1,675 km^{2} (647 sq mi)

Population (2020)
  - Total: 71,466
  - Density: 42.67/km^{2} (110.5/sq mi)
- Time zone: UTC+8 (China Standard Time (Note: Locals in Xinjiang frequently observe UTC+6 (Xinjiang Time), two hours behind Beijing.))
- Website: www.xjhegs.gov.cn

Khorgos

Chinese name
- Simplified Chinese: 霍尔果斯市
- Traditional Chinese: 霍爾果斯市
Transcriptions
Standard Mandarin
- Hanyu Pinyin: Huò'ěrguǒsī shì

Uyghur name
- Uyghur: قورغاس شەھىرى
Transcriptions
- Latin Yëziqi: Qorghas shehiri
- Yengi Yeziⱪ: Ⱪorƣas xəⱨiri
- Siril Yëziqi: Қорғас шәһири

Russian name
- Russian: Город Хоргос
- Romanization: Gorod Khorgos

Kazakh name
- Kazakh: قورعاس قالاسى; Қорғас қаласы Qorğas qalası

Khorgos (from Russian: Хоргос; Chinese: 霍尔果斯), officially known as Korgas (Kazakh: قورعاس; Uyghur: قورغاس), is a county-level city in Ili Kazakh Autonomous Prefecture, Xinjiang, China. It straddles the country's border with Kazakhstan; on the Kazakh side of the border is a city also named Horgos in Russian and Korgas in Kazakh.

Khorgos area is a hub of the New Eurasian Land Bridge, 200 km from the Alataw Pass, the historically important Dzungarian Gate, with a cross-border visa-free special economic zone for trade and shopping (ICBC), a dry port for transporting goods and two new cities, one on either side of the border.

== History ==
In 1851, the Russian Empire signed an agreement with Qing China to have Khorgos and Tacheng opened as port of entries along the Qing-Russian border.

In 1977, the 61st Regiment Farm fire in Khorgos killed 694 and injured 161. It is one of the worst human-made disasters in China by death toll.

== Transportation ==
The Jinghe–Yining–Khorgos railway was completed in late 2009 and as of 2012 provides train service from Ürümqi and Yining to Khorgos.

Passenger trains from Ürümqi started on 1 July 2010; however, they initially only ran to Yining and not all the way to Khorgos. In December 2013, one of the daily Ürümqi-Yining passenger trains was extended to Khorgos. The travel time from Khorgos to Yining then was just over an hour.

In December 2011, a 293-kilometre (182 mi) railway from the Khorgos border crossing to Zhetygen terminal (near Almaty) was completed; on 2 December 2012, the tracks from the Chinese and Kazakhstan sides of the borders were connected. For some months, the railway on the Kazakh side was still operating in a test mode. The railway border crossing (port of entry) at Khorgos became operational in the late 2012; the first regular trains from the two countries crossed the border on 22 December 2012. Thus, Khorgos, an international dry port, connects land-locked Kazakhstan to the sea port of Lianyungang in China.

The railway border crossing is expected to handle up to 15 million tons of freight per year initially, the volume rising to 30 million tons per year in the long run, opening up the second Europe-China rail link via Kazakhstan.

Khorgos is a major break of gauge interchange. 41-ton gantry cranes are used to move shipping containers between standard gauge Chinese trains and Russian gauge Kazakh trains, connecting to Altynkol railway station on a spur line of Kazakhstan Temir Zholy.

In June 2017, the Ürümqi Railway Bureau of the China Railway started daily passenger service from Ürümqi to Astana via Khorgos.

== Economy ==
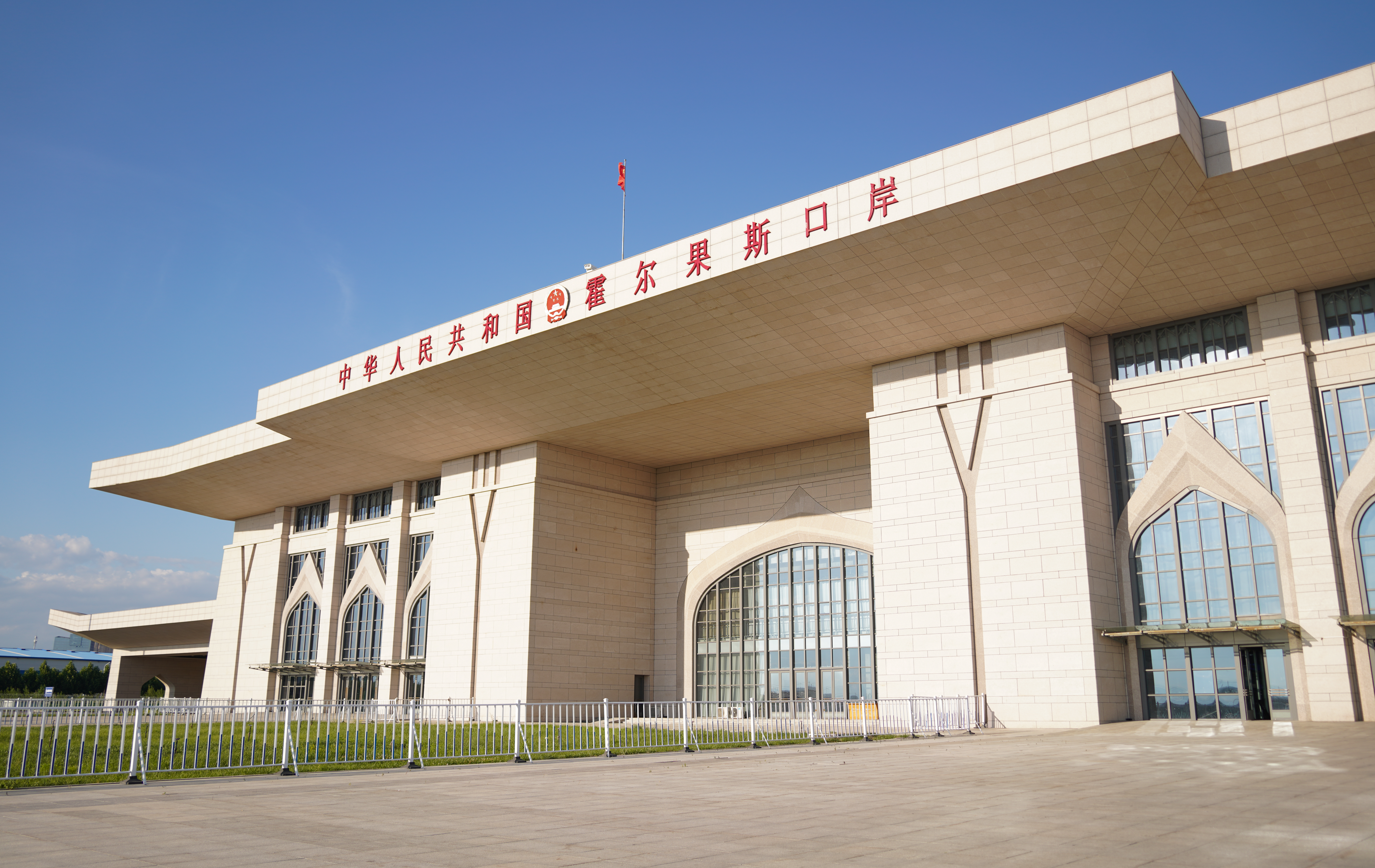
Khorgos Port on the China–Kazakhstan border

Khorgos is the second-largest dry port in the world as of 2024.

In 2002, China and Kazakhstan agreed to set up a border trade center in Khorgos, the SEZ International Centre for Border Cooperation.

In 2017, Boshihao Electronics, a robot manufacturing company, moved production from Shenzhen to Khorgos.

== Climate ==
Climate data for Khorgos, elevation 722 m (2,369 ft), (1991–2020 normals, extremes 1991–present)
Month	Jan	Feb	Mar	Apr	May	Jun	Jul	Aug	Sep	Oct	Nov	Dec	Year
Record high °C (°F)	11.9 (53.4)	16.5 (61.7)	27.7 (81.9)	33.6 (92.5)	37.0 (98.6)	37.7 (99.9)	42.1 (107.8)	39.5 (103.1)	35.7 (96.3)	31.5 (88.7)	24.0 (75.2)	15.3 (59.5)	42.1 (107.8)
Mean daily maximum °C (°F)	−0.9 (30.4)	2.0 (35.6)	11.1 (52.0)	20.3 (68.5)	25.4 (77.7)	29.4 (84.9)	31.3 (88.3)	30.6 (87.1)	25.9 (78.6)	18.0 (64.4)	8.5 (47.3)	1.3 (34.3)	16.9 (62.4)
Daily mean °C (°F)	−5.8 (21.6)	−2.8 (27.0)	5.6 (42.1)	13.6 (56.5)	18.6 (65.5)	22.7 (72.9)	24.6 (76.3)	23.8 (74.8)	19.0 (66.2)	11.6 (52.9)	3.4 (38.1)	−3.2 (26.2)	10.9 (51.7)
Mean daily minimum °C (°F)	−9.5 (14.9)	−6.5 (20.3)	1.1 (34.0)	8.3 (46.9)	12.9 (55.2)	17.1 (62.8)	19.0 (66.2)	17.9 (64.2)	13.2 (55.8)	6.6 (43.9)	−0.2 (31.6)	−6.7 (19.9)	6.1 (43.0)
Record low °C (°F)	−28.5 (−19.3)	−25.9 (−14.6)	−16.8 (1.8)	−6.9 (19.6)	−1.1 (30.0)	8.1 (46.6)	10.1 (50.2)	7.7 (45.9)	1.1 (34.0)	−7.1 (19.2)	−18.6 (−1.5)	−25.4 (−13.7)	−28.5 (−19.3)
Average precipitation mm (inches)	19.4 (0.76)	19.2 (0.76)	17.2 (0.68)	28.3 (1.11)	24.8 (0.98)	33.7 (1.33)	26.5 (1.04)	17.3 (0.68)	11.9 (0.47)	20.7 (0.81)	26.9 (1.06)	20.9 (0.82)	266.8 (10.5)
Average precipitation days (≥ 0.1 mm)	8.6	8.1	6.5	7.0	7.8	8.6	8.2	5.8	4.2	5.2	7.2	8.8	86
Average snowy days	9.9	9.5	3.9	1.0	0	0	0	0	0	0.8	5.1	10.1	40.3
Average relative humidity (%)	69	69	59	49	46	47	46	43	43	52	65	71	55
Mean monthly sunshine hours	160.8	175.6	234.7	266.9	319.8	325.1	344.1	329.5	285.7	240.3	161.1	144.4	2,988
Percentage possible sunshine	55	58	62	65	69	70	74	78	78	72	57	53	66
Source: China Meteorological Administrationall-time extreme temperature

== Administrative divisions ==
Khorgos is divided into 4 subdistricts, 1 ethnic township, and 2 township-equivalent regions.

Name	Simplified Chinese	Hanyu Pinyin	Uyghur (UEY)	Uyghur Latin (ULY)	Kazakh (Arabic script)	Kazakh (Cyrillic script)	Administrative division code	Notes
Subdistricts
Qarasu Subdistrict	卡拉苏街道	Kǎlāsū Jiēdào	قاراسۇ كوچا باشقارمىسى	qarasu kocha bashqarmisi	قاراسۋ ءمالى باسقارماسى	Қарасу мәлі басқармасы	654004001	
Ya-Ou East Road Subdistrict	亚欧东路街道	Yà'ōudōnglù Jiēdào	ياۋروئاسىيا شەرقىي يولى كوچا باشقارمىسى	Yawro'asiya sherqiy yoli kocha bashqarmisi	ەۆرو-ازيا شىعىس جولى ءمالى باسقارماسى	Еуразия шығыс жолы мәлі басқармасы	654004002	
Ya-Ou West Road Subdistrict	亚欧西路街道	Yà'ōuxīlù Jiēdào	ياۋروئاسىيا غەربىي يولى كوچا باشقارمىسى	Yawro'asiya gherbiy yoli kocha bashqarmisi	ەۆرو-ازيا باتىس جولى ءمالى باسقارماسى	Еуразия батыс жолы мәлі басқармасы	654004003	
Industrial Park Subdistrict	工业园区街道	Gōngyèyuánqū Jiēdào	سانائەت رايونى كوچا باشقارمىسى	sana'et rayoni kocha bashqarmisi	ونەركاسىپتىك اۋدان ءمالى باسقارماسى	Өнеркәсіптік аудан мәлі басқармасы	654004004	
Ethnic township
Ichëgashen Township (Ichëgashen Sibe Ethnic Township)	伊车嘎善乡 (伊车嘎善锡伯族乡)	Yīchēgāshàn Xiāng (Yīchēgāshàn Xíbózú Xiāng)	ئىچېگاشەن شىبە يېزىسى	Ichëgashen shibe yëzisi	يچىگاشان سىبە ۇلتتىق اۋىلى	Ичігәшән Сібе Ұлттық ауылы	654004200	(Xibe) ᡞᠴᡝ ᡤᠠᡧᠠᠨ ᠰᡞᠪᡝ ᡤᡡᠰᠠ ice gašan sibe gūsa

Others:

- 61st Regiment Farm (六十一团)
- 62nd Regiment Farm (六十二团)

== See also ==
- Transport in China
- Transport in Kazakhstan
- Railway stations in Kazakhstan
- Nurkent

== Gallery ==
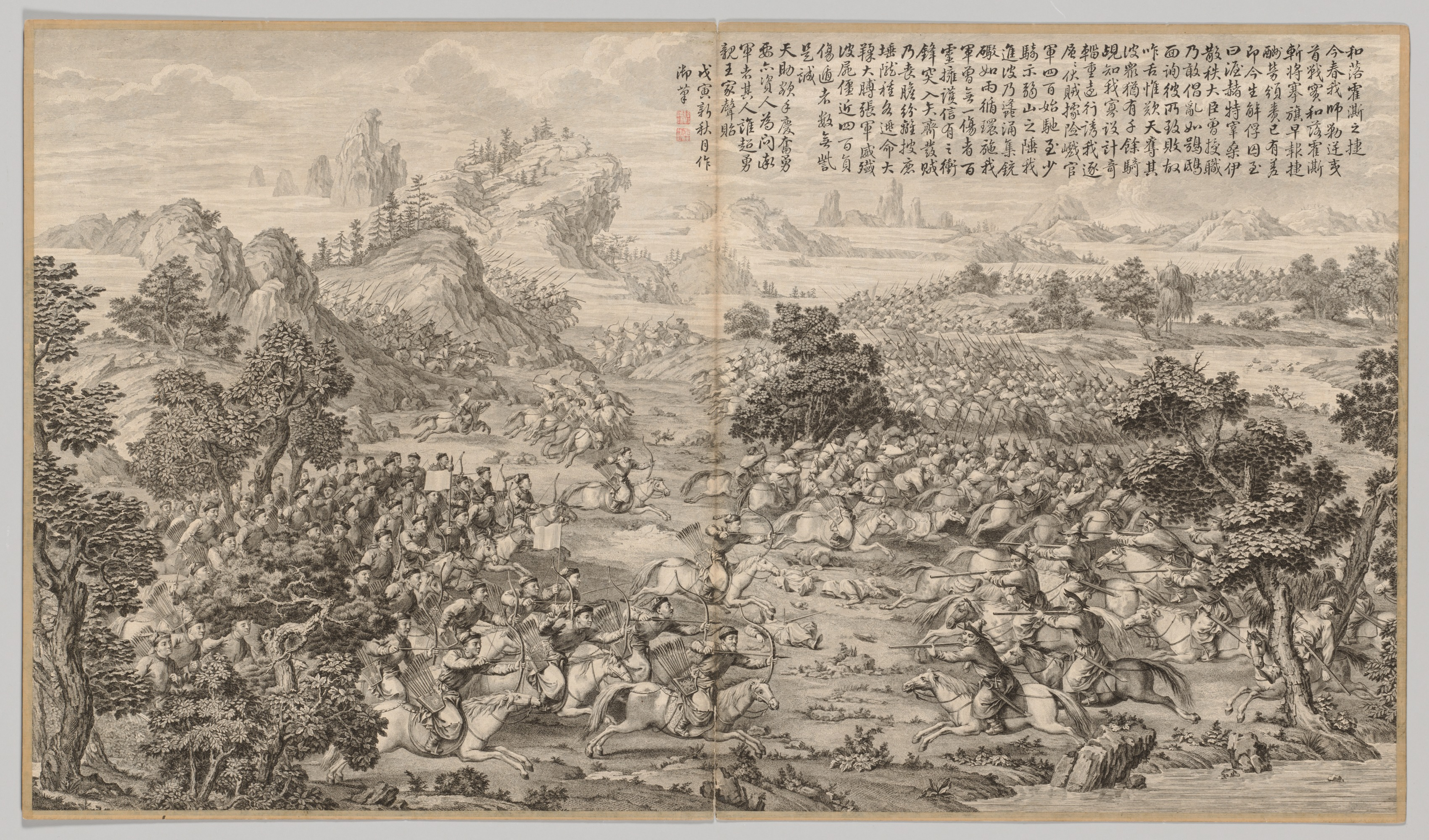
The 1758 Victory of Khorgos, a 1774 engraving by Jacques-Philippe Le Bas (1707-1783), after Jean-Denis Attiret (1702-1768). Musée Guimet, Paris.

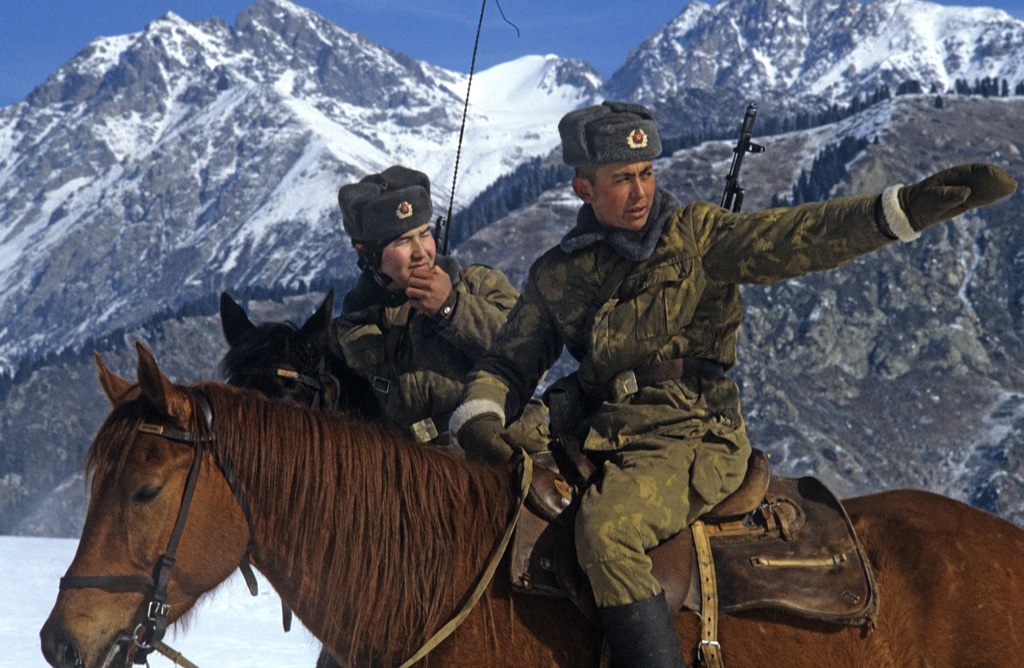
Soviet border guards near Korgas (1984)

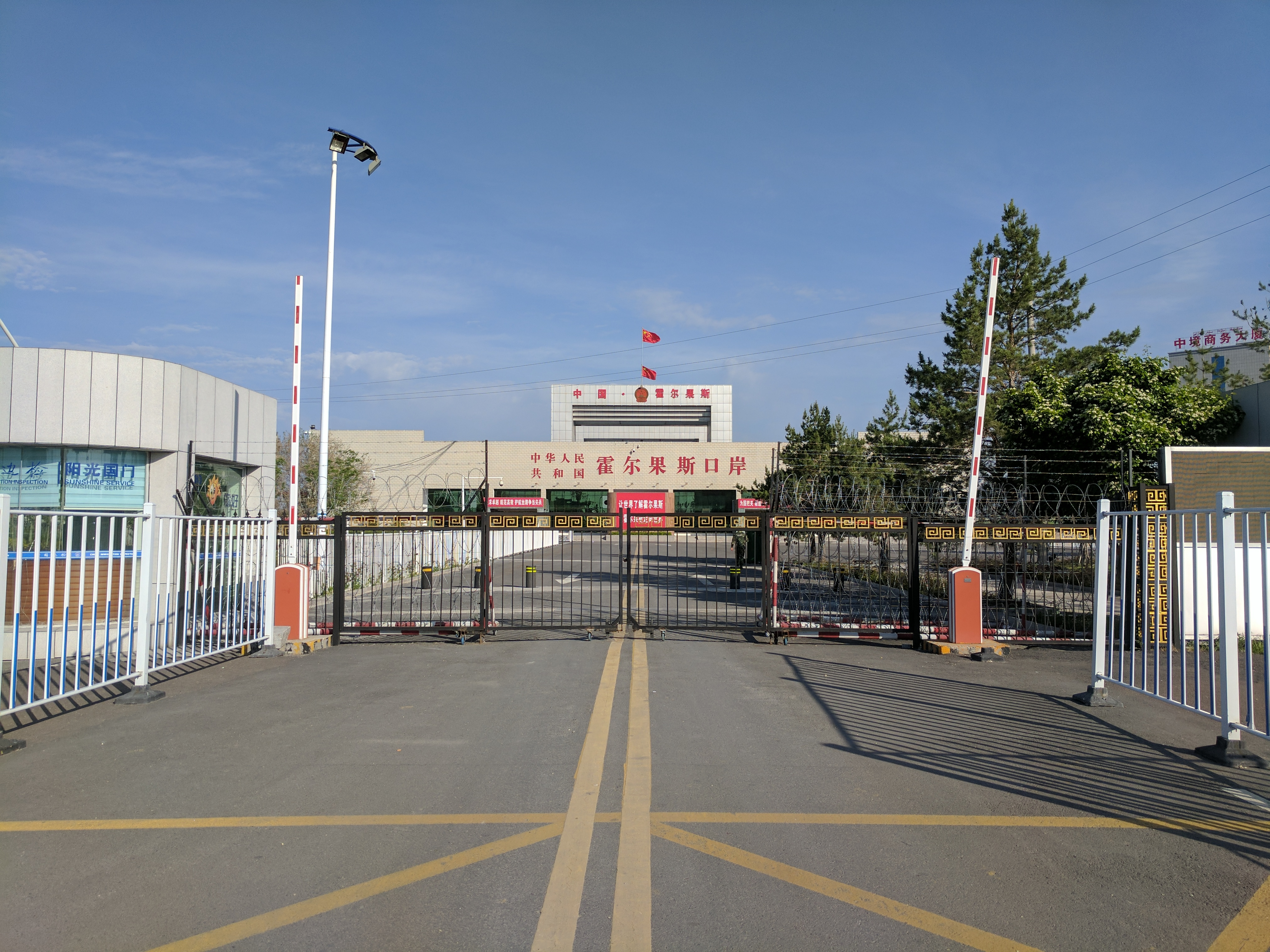
Khorgos Port gate
