= Alatau, Almaty Region =

Alatau
- Location in Kazakhstan
- Coordinates: 43.6743°N 77.1082°E
- Country: Kazakhstan
- Region: Almaty Region

Government
  - Akim: Arken Utenov

Population (2021 census)
  - Total: 20,418

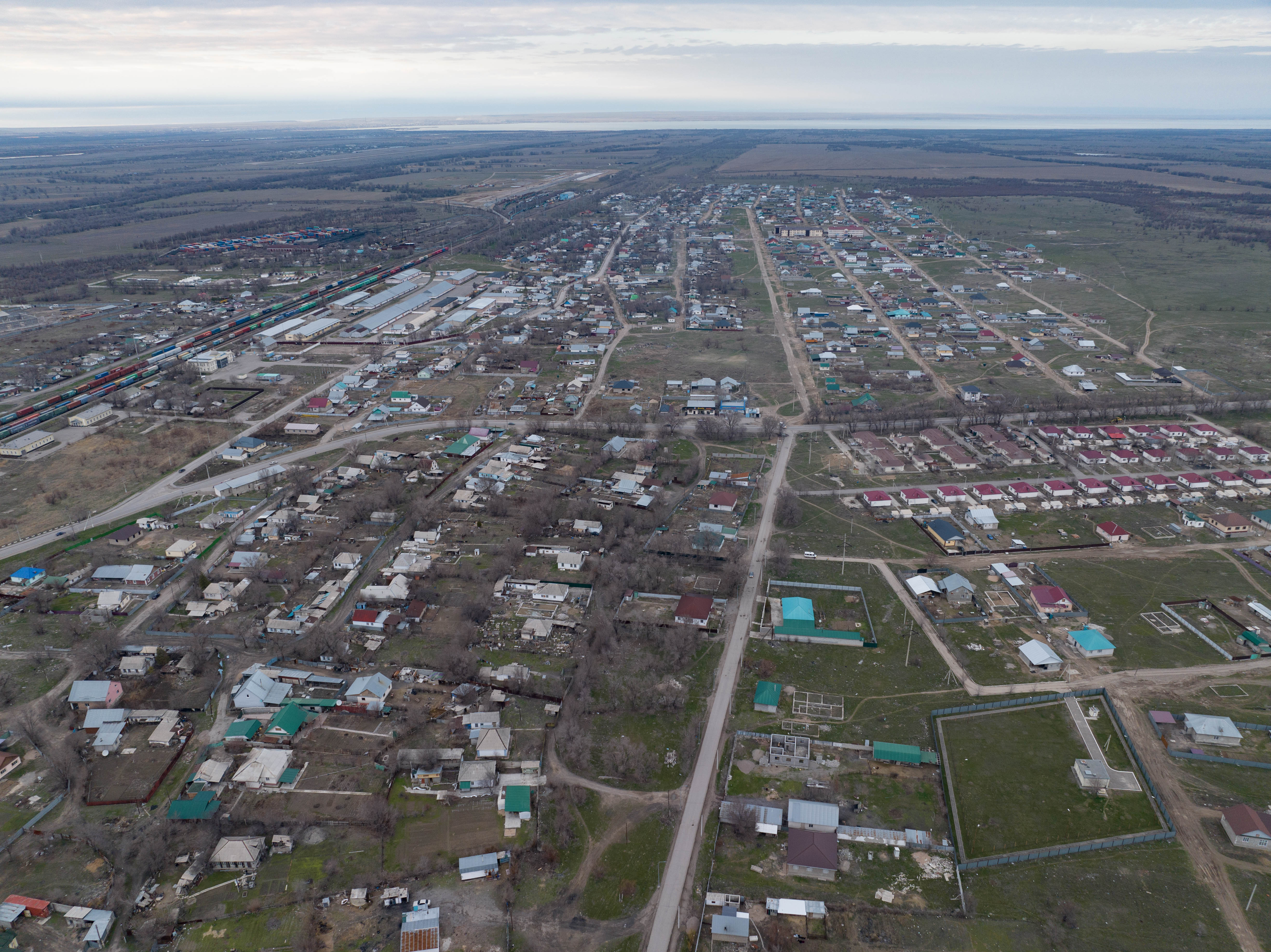
Zhetygen photographed from above. Almaty Region, Kazakhstan.

Alatau (Kazakh: Алатау, Alatau; Russian: Алатау, Alatau), formerly known as Zhetigen, Nikolaevka (Kazakh: Жетіген, Jetıgen, جەتٸگەن; Russian: Жетыген, Zhetygen) is a town in Almaty Region of Kazakhstan. It is located some 50 km north of Almaty, on the Turksib rail line.

== History ==
On November 15, 2023, a decree was prepared by the President of the Republic of Kazakhstan, Kassym-Jomart Tokayev, "On changes in the administrative and territorial structure of the Almaty region" with the assignment of the village to the status of a city and subsequent renaming to Alatau. On January 9, 2024, the village of Zhetygen was transformed into a city of regional subordination and renamed Alatau. On 20 March, 2026, deputies of the Parliament approved in the first reading a draft law establishing the special status of Alatau.

== Train connections ==
Services at Zhetygen station
- Preceding station	KTJ	Following station
  Iliyskiy towards Novosibirsk, Russia	Turkestan–Siberia Railway	Kayrat Junction towards Arys I
  through to Astana via Turkestan–Siberia Railway	Turkestan–Siberia Railway; Zhetygen–Altynkol branch	Kurozek towards Altynkol

== Services ==
- Alatau (sanatorium)
