= Giuseppe Panzi =

Italian painter

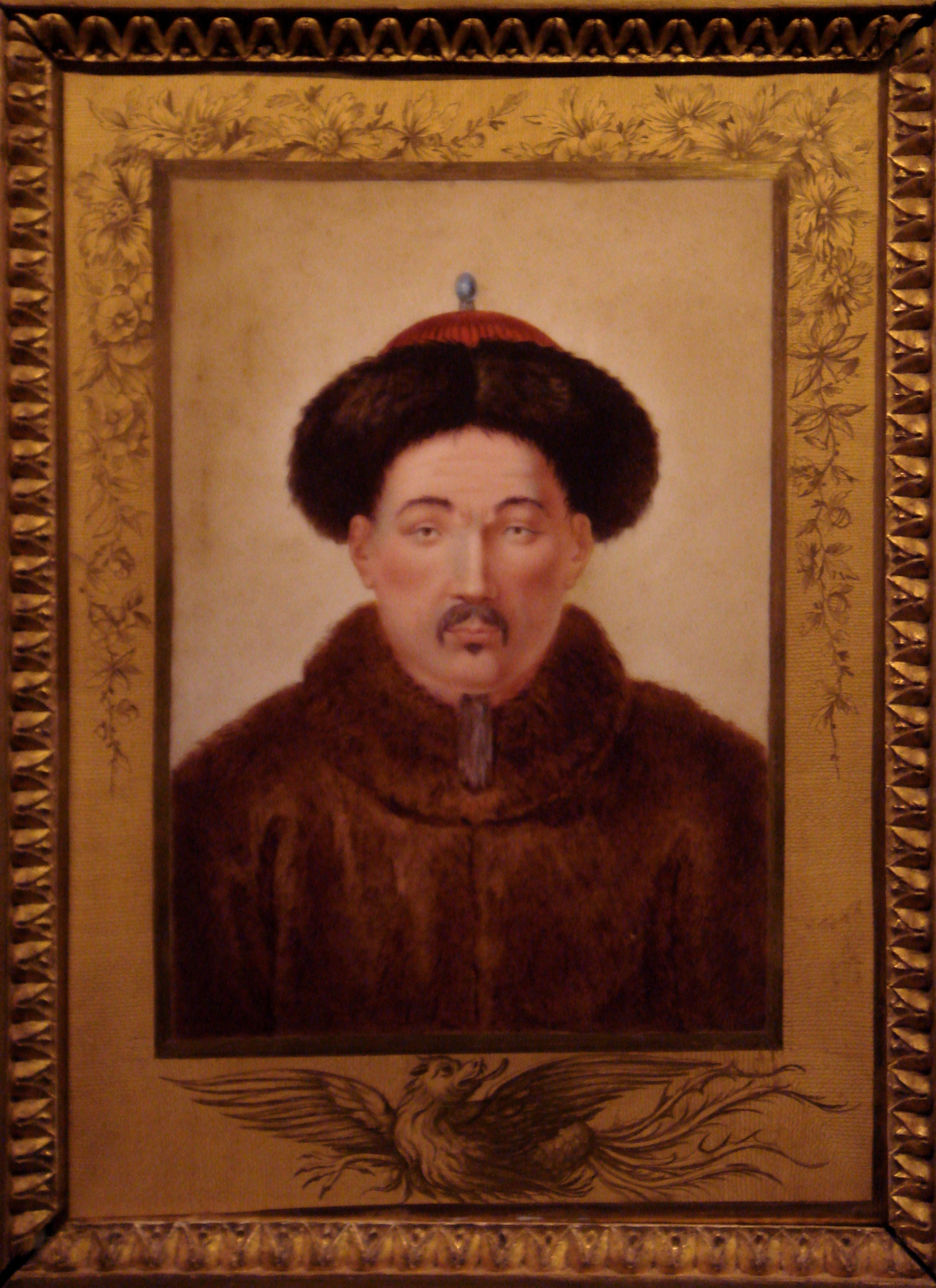
The Qianlong Emperor, by Charles-Eloi Asselin (1743-1805) after Giuseppe Panzi. Louvre Museum.

Giuseppe Panzi (潘廷章、1734–before 1812) was a Jesuit painter of the 18th and early 19th century, who worked in the service of the Qianlong Emperor of China. He was the last of the Western painters who worked for the Qianlong Emperor, together with Father Louis Antoine de Poirot (1735–1813).

Giuseppe Panzi arrived in Beijing, in 1773, where the two painters replaced the more famous Giuseppe Castiglione and Jean-Denis Attiret.

== See also ==
- Jesuit China missions
