= Alatau (sanatorium) =

Sanatorium in Almaty, Kazakhstan

Coordinates: 43.196462°N 76.812748°E

Sanatorium "Alatau" (Russian: санаторий Алатау, tr. sanatoriy Alatau) is a health-improving, medical-preventive sanatorium located in Almaty, Kazakhstan.

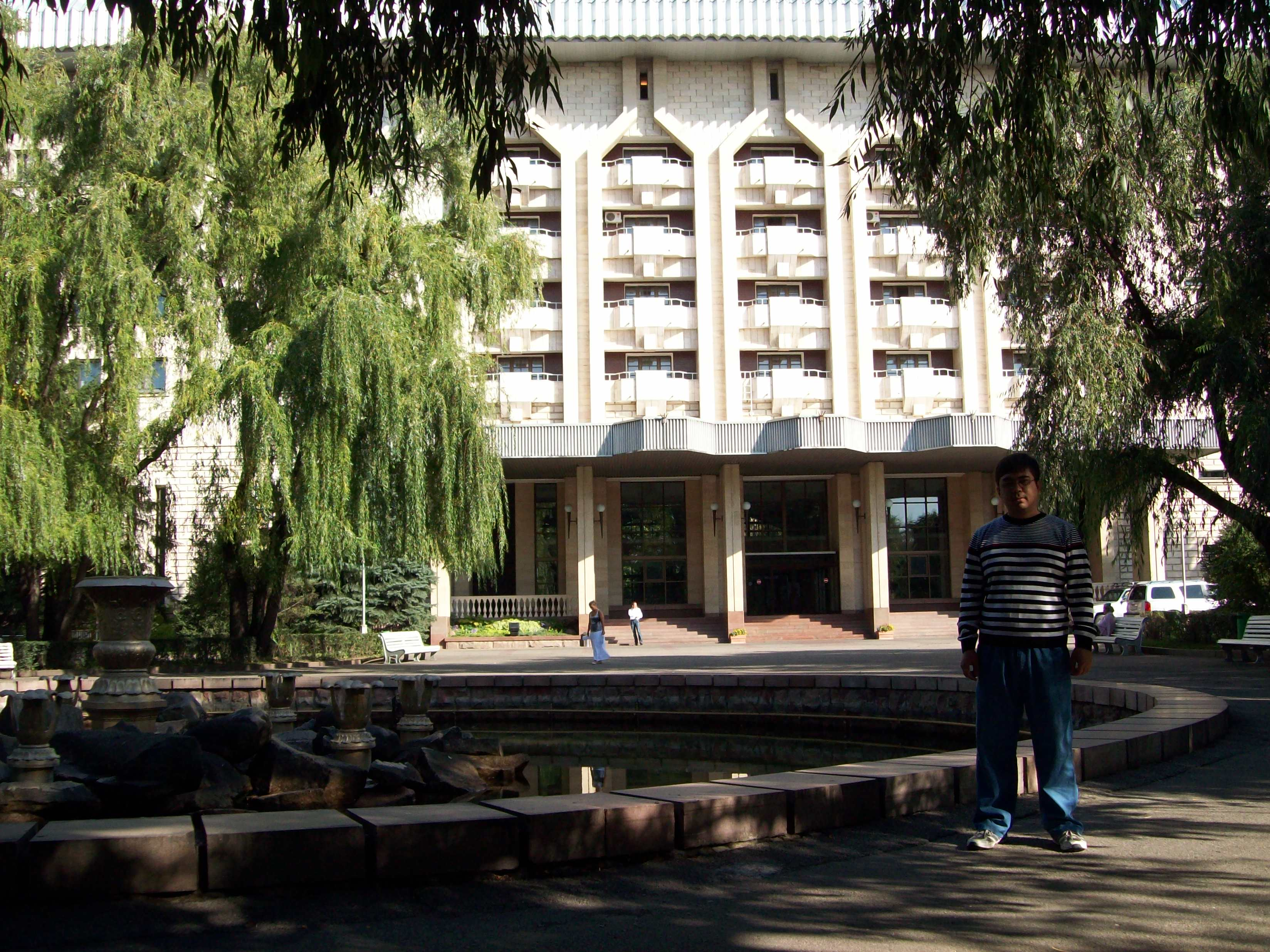
Sanatorium "Alatau" Outside view

== History ==
The sanatorium was built in 1986. The authors of the project were architects Yu.G. Ratushny, T.E. Eraliev, O.N.Balykbaev, G.D.Dzhubangaliev, V.I.Sidorov. Design engineers M.E. Erkenov, Zh.S. Syzdykov, V.Ya. Markus, M.V.Kim also worked on the project. Initially, the territory of the complex was 36 hectares.

The balneological resort is a large sanatorium complex, which consists of several objects. Visitors are greeted by a colonnade, opened towards the main building, the smooth bend of which closes the zoned space on the north side, where there are sports grounds, promenade alleys leading to a picturesque pond.

In 2017, the sanatorium was closed for reconstruction for the first major overhaul and renovation of medical equipment. The preservation of the historical appearance of the object of history and culture of Almaty is separately emphasized. Reopening after restoration is scheduled for 2020.

Since September 2021, the resort is called "Swissotel Wellness Resort Alatau Almaty" and is a five-star hotel with 222 rooms, a restaurant, sports fields and a water park. The property has its own source of mineral water.

== Architecture ==
The architectural style of the sanatorium is a postmodern. The building has a long southern facade, which was decided by a strict rhythm by the horizontal arrangement of the belts of the loggias of the guest rooms. The architecture of the facade of the complex organically continues the volumetric-spatial structure of the building. The complex has been decorated with natural materials such as precious woods, granite and marble. The foundation is a pile field made of reinforced concrete piles.

The structural scheme of the lower floors of the main building is based on a honeycomb system - reinforced concrete arches crossed in plan, which serves as a support for the upper floors, which are designed in monolithic reinforced concrete with transverse walls, in which arched openings are left along the entire corridor of the sleeping building.

The territory in front of the sanatorium is divided into several functional zones: the square is a parterre enclosed in the north by a colonnade, a sports area, an active and quiet recreation area. The main building is structurally divided by anti-seismic belts.

== Monument of history and culture ==
On November 10, 2010, a new State List of Historical and Cultural Monuments of Local Significance of the city of Almaty was approved, simultaneously with which all previous decisions on this matter were invalidated. This Resolution retained the status of a local monument to the Alatau sanatorium. The boundaries of the protected zones were approved in 2014
