= Jean Denis Attiret =

French painter

The 1758 Victory of Khorgos, painted by Jean-Denis Attiret (1702–1768)

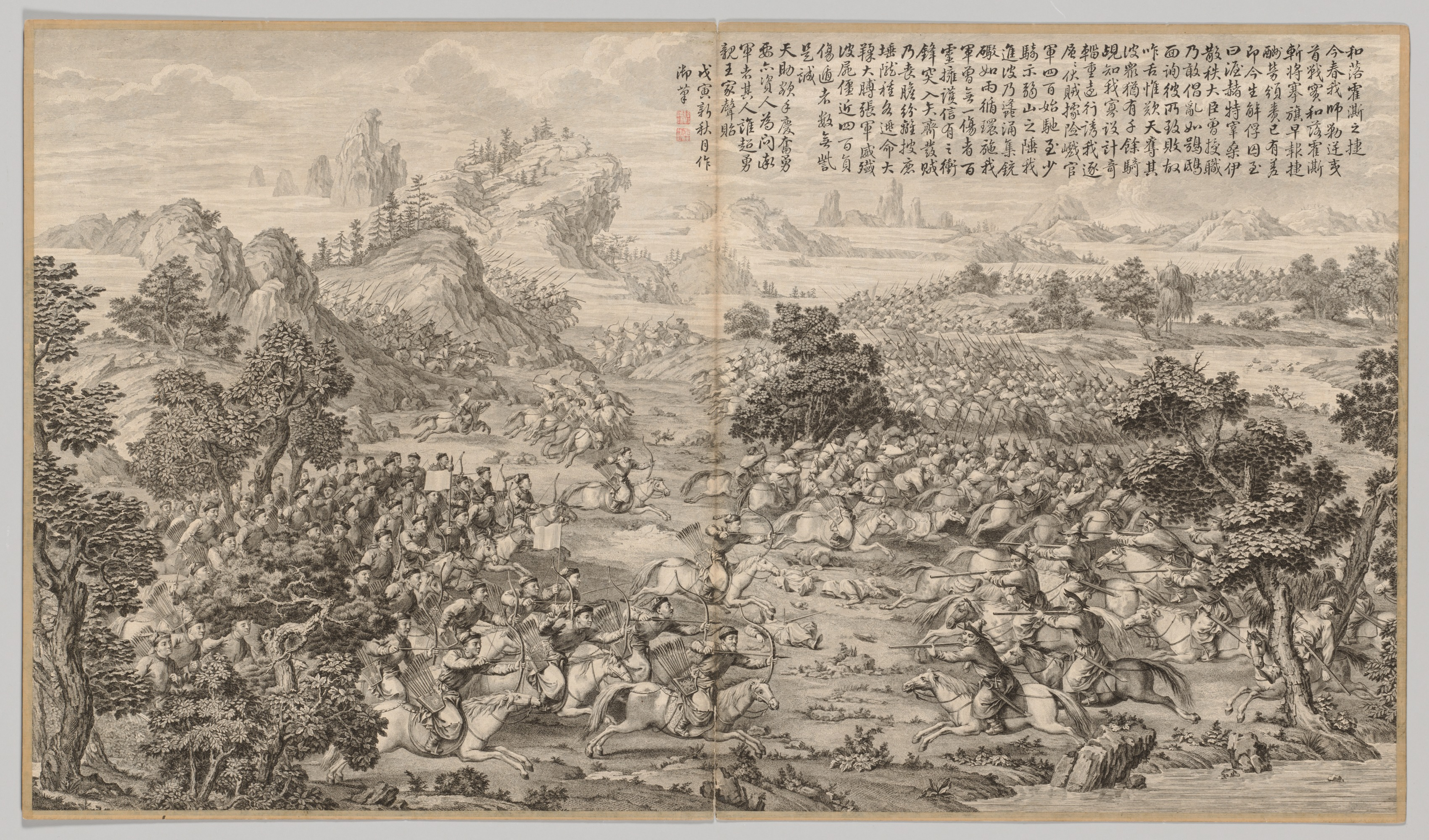
The 1758 Victory of Khorgos, a 1774 engraving by Jacques-Philippe Le Bas (1707–1783), after Jean-Denis Attiret (1702–1768). Louvre Museum.

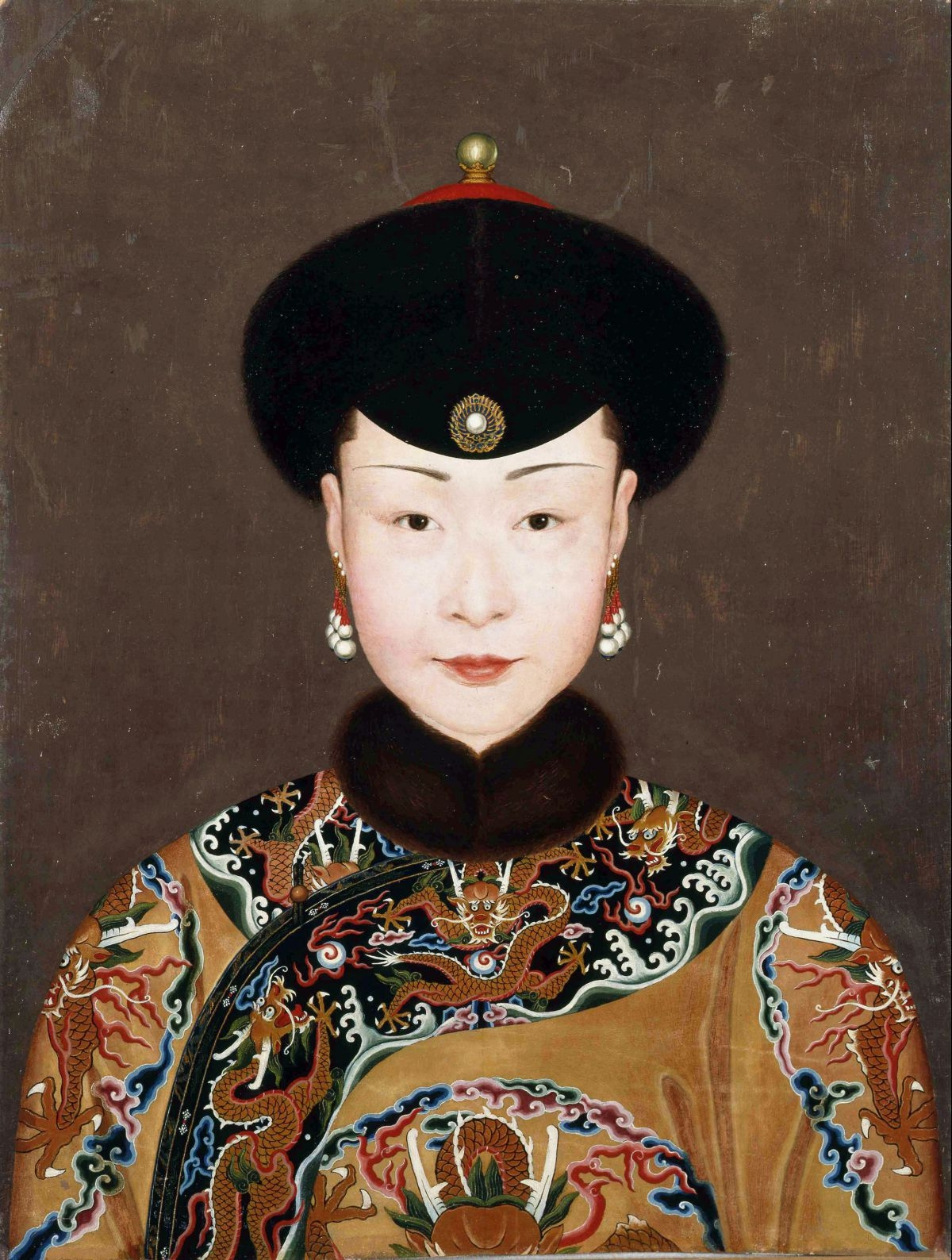
"La Concubine", purportedly a portrait of Empress Nara, by Jean Denis Attiret, c. 1750. Museum of Fine Arts, Dole.

Jean Denis Attiret (Chinese: 王致誠; pinyin: Wáng Zhì Chéng, 31 July 1702 – 8 December 1768) was a French Jesuit painter and missionary to Qing China.

== Early life ==
Attiret was born in Dole, France. He studied art in Rome and made himself a name as a painter. While a Jesuit novice, he did paintings in the Cathedral of Avignon and the Sodality Chapel.

He went to China in 1737 and was given the title Painter to the Emperor by the Qianlong Emperor. Because the emperor insisted on the use of Chinese painting methods and styles, Attiret's painting eventually became entirely Chinese in style. Most of his works were paintings of natural subjects such as trees, fruit, fish and other animals done on glass or silk. However, many of them also include portraits of members of the imperial family and court; altogether he is credited with at least 200 portraits.

== Works ==
After successful military campaigns in Central Asia, the Qianlong Emperor commissioned depictions of the battles. The work was carried out by four Jesuit artists, among them Attiret. The group produced 16 tableaux, which were engraved in France in 1774, six years after Attiret's death in Beijing.

== See also ==
- Jesuit China missions
