= Panfilov District, Kazakhstan =

Coordinates: 44.1724°N 80.008°E

Panfilov
- District
- Панфилов ауданы
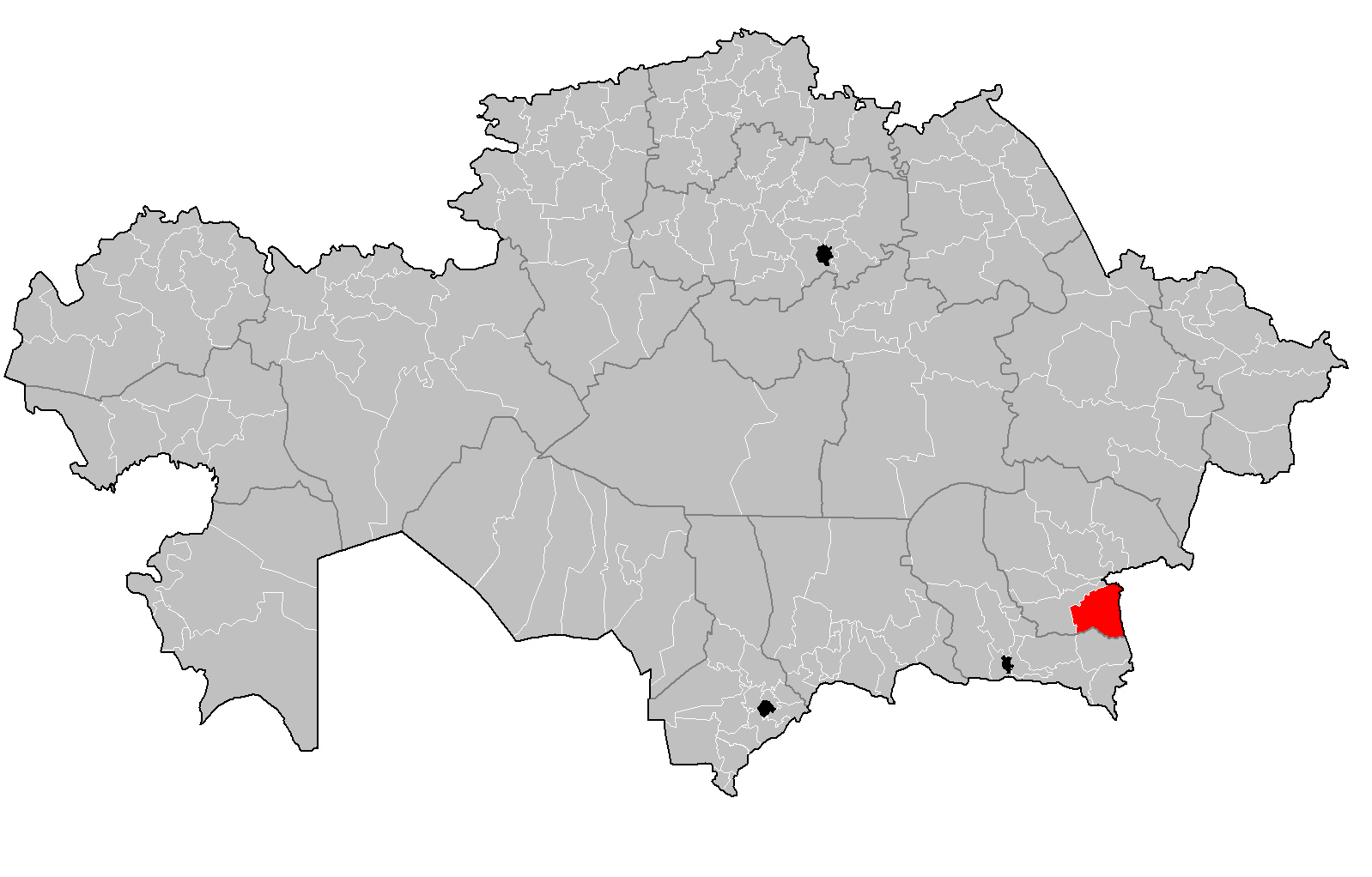
- Country: Kazakhstan
- Region: Jetisu Region
- Administrative center: Zharkent
- Founded: 1928

Government
  - Akim (mayor): Sagymbek Marat Rahymberdievich

Area
  - Total: 4,100 sq mi (10,600 km^{2})

Population (2019)
  - Total: 129,204
- Time zone: UTC+6 (East)

Panfilov District (Kazakh: Панфилов ауданы, Panfilov audany) is a district of Jetisu Region in Kazakhstan. The administrative center of the district is the town of Zharkent. As of 2019, the district's population is 129,204.

== Demographics ==
=== Historic population ===
Panfilov District's population has steadily grown since the independence of Kazakhstan, with its population reaching 129,204 as of 2019; 119,920 (2013 estimate); 113,059 (2009 census results); 112,984 (1999 census results).

=== Ethnic groups ===
Ethnic Groups of Panfilov District
Ethnic Group	Population (2019)	Percent of Total
Kazakh	86,035	66.59%
Uighur	36,745	28.44%
Russian	4,561	3.53%
Tatar	397	0.31%
Uzbek	282	0.22%
Kyrgyz	85	0.07%
Ukrainian	76	0.06%
German	59	0.05%
Koreans	57	0.04%
Chechen	45	0.03%
Azerbaijani	20	0.02%
Turkish	17	0.01%
Greek	10	0.01%
Others	815	0.63%
Total	129,204	100.00%
