= Yishan (official) =

Official of Qing China (1790–1878)

First Class Zhenguo Jiangjun Yishan Grand Minister of State Grand Guardian
- 奕山
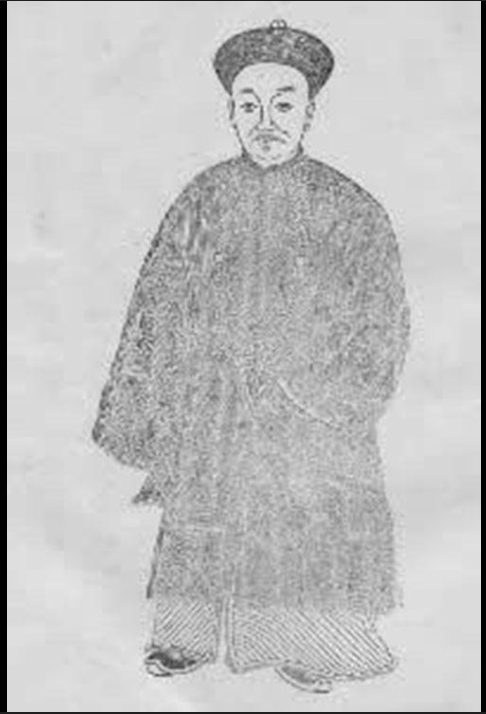
- Official portrait, 1838

Imperial Commissioner of the Qing
- In office 27 February 1841 – 28 May 1841
- Monarch: Daoguang Emperor
- Preceded by: Qishan
- Succeeded by: Keying

Deputy Lieutenant General of the Bordered Red Banner
- In office 1810–1821
- Monarchs: Jiaqing Emperor; Daoguang Emperor
- In office 1826 – 1828 (as the Lieutenant General)
- Monarch: Daoguang Emperor

Imperial Bodyguard
- In office 1821–1826
- Monarch: Daoguang Emperor

Vice Commander-in-Chief of the Tartar Garrison
- In office 1828–1830
- Monarch: Daoguang Emperor

General of Ili
- In office 1830 – 17 December 1840 Serving with Yulin (1830 - 1831) and Teyishunbao (1831 - 1837)
- Monarch: Daoguang Emperor
- Preceded by: Deying'a
- Succeeded by: Guanfu
- In office 1845 – 1855 (As Banshi Dachen of Khotan since 1843) Serving with Buyantai as Banshi Dachen
- Monarchs: Daoguang Emperor; Xianfeng Emperor
- Preceded by: Buyantai
- Succeeded by: Zhalafentai

General of Heilongjiang
- In office 1855–1860
- Monarch: Xianfeng Emperor

Viceroy of Liangguang
- In office 27 February 1841 – 17 November 1842
- Monarch: Daoguang Emperor
- Preceded by: Qishan
- Succeeded by: Qi Gong

Personal details
- Born: 13 June 1790 Beijing
- Died: 30 June 1878 (aged 88) Beijing
- Children: Zhen'guo (鎮國); Zai'e; Zaizhuo
- Education: Beijing banner school
- Occupation: Politician
- Awards: Grand Minister of State; Grand Guardian
- Known for: Failure to defend Guangzhou from the British in the First Opium War; Negotiating and signing the treaties of Kulja and Aigun with the Russian Empire

Military service
- Allegiance: Qing Dynasty
- Branch/service: Manchu Banner Army
- Years of service: 1810 - 1878
- Rank: Imperial Commissioner; Viceroy of Liangguang
- Battles/wars: First Opium War: Second Battle of Canton; Second Opium War

Yishan
- Chinese: 奕山
Transcriptions
Standard Mandarin
- Hanyu Pinyin: Yìshān
- Wade–Giles: I-shan

Jingxuan (courtesy name)
- Traditional Chinese: 靜軒
- Simplified Chinese: 静轩
Transcriptions
Standard Mandarin
- Hanyu Pinyin: Jìngxuān
- Wade–Giles: Ching-hsüan

Yishan, Zhenguo Jiangjun (Manchu: I Šan; 13 June 1790 – 30 June 1878), courtesy name Jingxuan, was a Manchu nobleman and official of the Qing dynasty (China). He was of Manchu and Aisin-Gioro descent, his family was of the Bordered Red Banner of the Manchu Eight Banners, and he lived during the reigns of the Qianlong, Jiaqing, Daoguang, Xianfeng, Tongzhi, and Guangxu emperors. He served as the Imperial Commissioner of the Qing Dynasty, the second-highest ranking position in the Qing government, only below that of emperor, during the later half of the First Opium War, and signed the Treaty of Kulja on behalf of the Qing Dynasty alongside Buyantai with the Russian Empire in 1851 and the Treaty of Aigun on behalf of the Qing in 1858, also with the russians.

Yishan was born in Beijing or Mukden (modern-day Shenyang), Qing Dynasty, on 13 June 1790. Being a distant relative of the Qing Dynasty Royal Family, he entered the Qing bureaucracy without taking the Imperial examination at the age of 20, in 1810. In 1821, after the Daoguang Emperor inherited the throne from the Jiaqing Emperor, Yishan was promoted to the emperor's bodyguard. He served in several more positions in the following decade. Yishan governed Ili from 1838 to 1840, and from 1845 to 1854.

He was chosen to be a military general in 1839 for the First Opium War, and was promoted to Imperial Commissioner and Viceroy of Liangguang in 1841. Mismanagement in Guangzhou and Humen led to his defence failures, and he was forced to sign a convention and surrender to the British. He was sentenced to death (later commuted to imprisonment) in late 1841, but was released in 1842. In 1843, he once again became the Daoguang Emperor's bodyguard. After finishing his Ili governance term in 1854, he governed Liaoning, Heilongjiang, and Jilin as Viceroy of the Three Eastern Provinces from 1855 to 1860, signing the Treaty of Aigun with the Russian Empire regarding the Qing's northeastern borders in 1858. He participated in the Second Opium War as a general from 1857 to 1860. Yishan died on 30 June 1878.

== Ancestry ==
=== Family ===
Yishan was from the Aisin-Gioro Clan, the imperial family of the Qing Dynasty, and he was part of the Bordered Red Banner of the Eight Banners of the Qing. He was a direct descendant of Hong Taiji (Emperor Taizong, 皇太極), the second emperor of the Later Jin Dynasty and the founding emperor of the Qing. Yishan was connected to Hong through the latter's 15th son, Prince Yu, who was Yishan's great-great-great-grandfather. Yishan's great-great-grandfather, Dong'e (董額), was the second son of Prince Yu and inherited Yu's position of Beizi (貝子). Yishan's great-grandfather, Hongchun (弘春; 1703–1739), once held the title of a junwang (second-rank prince) as "Prince Tai of the Second Rank" (多羅泰郡王). Yishan's grandfather was named Fengxiang (奉祥), although his positions in the Qing bureaucracy were unknown. Yishan's father was named Qiwei (奇偉), and he was appointed the hereditary title of Jiangjun (將軍).

Yishan's uncle, Yunti, was the Kangxi Emperor's 14th son and the first in line in the Prince Xun peerage. A character in Yishan's Chinese name, Yi (奕), was a generational character and part of a court-mandated poetic sequence devised by the Qianlong Emperor to name generations of the Aisin-Gioro clan.

=== Aisin-Gioro Clan ===
==== Place of Origin ====
The Aisin-Gioro clan originated from the Jurchen tribes situated in Manchuria, a region in Northeastern China and Southeasternmost Russia. The clan's ancestral home is located near Yilan County, an area in modern-day Heilongjiang. In etymology, Aisin means 'gold', corresponding to Chinese 金 jīn. Gioro refers to the clan's ancestral home in Yilan County. The Aisin-Gioro House had no system of automatic succession such as primogeniture or a law of succession. Instead, an emperor would name an heir in a secret edict. The edict would be read before senior members of the clan following the emperor's death. An emperor could have numerous sons by women of various ranks.

Flag of the Bordered Red Banner

Coat of arms of the Aisin-Gioro clan

==== Ancestral Legend ====
The Aisin-Gioro's ancestor is Bukūri Yongšon, a legendary warrior of the 13th century. Hong stated that Yongšon was conceived from a virgin birth. According to the legend, three heavenly maidens, Enggulen, Jenggulen, and Fekulen, were bathing at a lake called Bulhūri Omo near the Changbai Mountains. A magpie dropped a piece of red fruit near Fekulen, who ate it. She then became pregnant with Bukūri Yongšon. However, this legend belongs to another Manchu clan, the Hurha (Hurka). The actual ancestor of the Jurchen tribe and Aisin-Gioro clan is Mengtemu, the chieftain of a Jurchen tribe during the rule of the Mongol Empire and Yuan Dynasty. Before Nurhaci, the first emperor of the Later Jin Dynasty, renamed the clan, the Aisin-Gioro clan was initially named Gioro hala. During the Ming Dynasty, many Jurchens, including Nurhaci's grandfather Giocangga and father Taksi, were officially considered vassals and granted titles by the Ming court, such as "Dragon Tiger General". They were allowed to trade horses, fur, and ginseng for essential Chinese goods like salt, textiles, and iron tools. Rivalries were also extremely common.

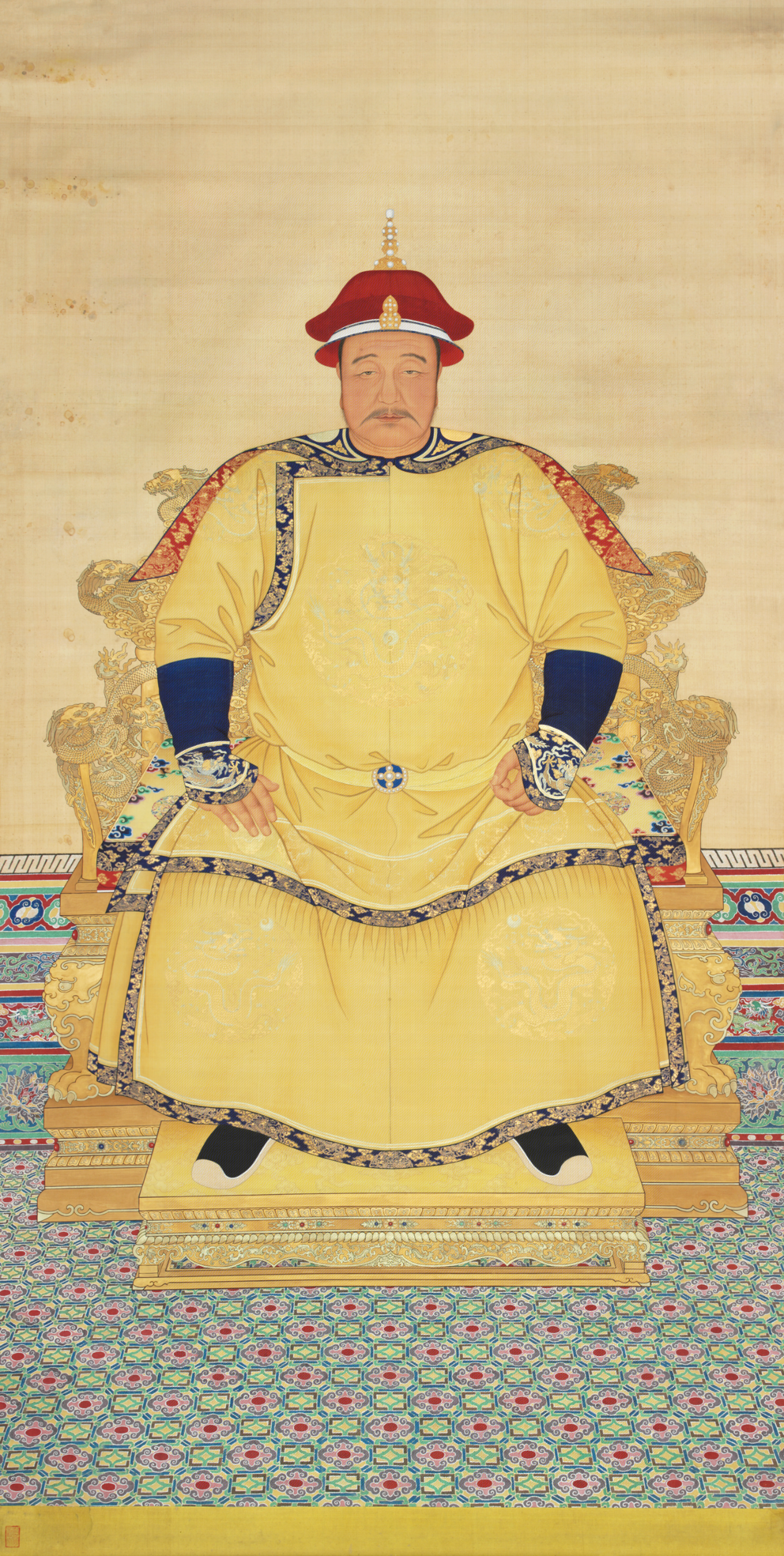
Hong Taiji

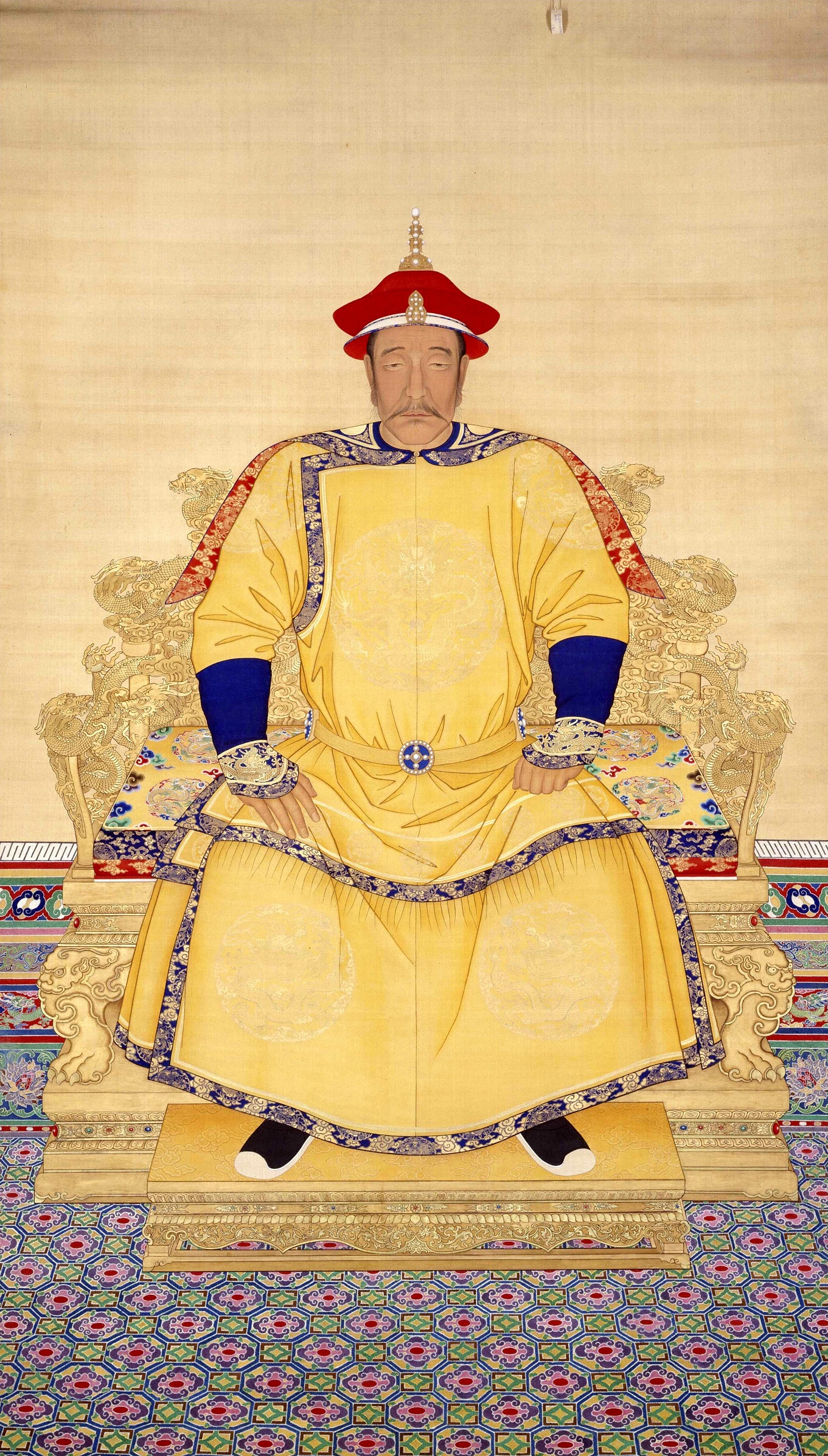
Nurhaci

==== History and Involvement with the Ming Dynasty ====
Under Nurhaci and Hong, the Aisin-Gioro clan of the Jianzhou tribe won hegemony among the rival Jurchen tribes of the northeast, then through warfare and alliances extended its control into Inner Mongolia. Nurhachi created large, permanent civil-military units called "banners" to replace the small hunting groups used in his early campaigns. A banner was composed of smaller companies; it included some 7,500 warriors and their households, including slaves, under the command of a chieftain. Each banner was identified by a coloured flag that was yellow, white, blue, or red, either plain or with a border design. Originally there were four, then eight, Manchu banners; new banners were created as the Manchu conquered new regions, and eventually there were Manchu, Mongol, and Chinese banners, eight for each ethnic group. The Qing conquest of the Ming dynasty was thus achieved with a multiethnic army led by Manchu nobles and Han Chinese generals. Han Chinese soldiers were organised into the Army of the Green Standard, which became a sort of imperial constabulary force posted throughout China and on the frontiers.

The change of the name from Jurchen to Manchu was made to hide the fact that the ancestors of the Manchus, the Jianzhou Jurchens, were ruled by the Chinese. By 1648, less than one-sixth of the bannermen were actually of Manchu ancestry. The Qing dynasty carefully hid the 2 original editions of the books of "Qing Taizu Wu Huangdi Shilu" and the "Manzhou Shilu Tu" (Taizu Shilu Tu) in the Qing palace, forbidden from public view because they showed that the Manchu Aisin Gioro family had been ruled by the Ming dynasty. In the Ming period, the Koreans of Joseon referred to the Jurchen inhabited lands north of the Korean peninsula, above the rivers Yalu and Tumen to be part of Ming China, as the "superior country" which they called Ming China. The Qing deliberately excluded references and information that showed the Jurchens (Manchus) as subservient to the Ming dynasty, from the History of Ming to hide their former subservient relationship to the Ming. The Veritable Records of the Ming were not used to source content on Jurchens during Ming rule in the History of Ming because of this. This historical revisionism helped remove the accusation of rebellion from the Qing ruling family refusing to mention in the Mingshi the fact that the Qing founders were Ming China's subjects. The Yongzheng Emperor of the Qing Dynasty attempted to rewrite the historical record and claim that the Aisin Gioro were never subjects of past dynasties and empires trying to cast Nurhaci's acceptance of Ming titles like Dragon Tiger General (龍虎將軍, longhu jiangjun) by claiming he accepted to "please Heaven".

==== Intermarriage with the Mongols ====
The Qing emperors arranged marriages between Aisin Gioro noblewomen and outsiders to create political marriage alliances. During the Manchu conquest of the Ming Dynasty, the Manchu rulers offered to marry their princesses to Han Chinese military officers who served the Ming Empire as a means of inducing these officers into surrendering or defecting to their side. Aisin Gioro princesses were also married to Mongol princes, for the purpose of forming alliances between the Manchus and Mongol tribes.

The Manchus successfully induced one Han Chinese general, Li Yongfang (李永芳), into defecting to their side by offering him a position in the Manchu banners. Li Yongfang also married the daughter of Abatai, a son of Nurhaci. Many more Han Chinese abandoned their posts in the Ming Dynasty and defected to the Manchu side. There were over 1,000 marriages between Han Chinese men and Manchu women in 1632. Due to a proposal by Yoto (岳托), a nephew of Hong. Hong believed that intermarriage between Han Chinese and Manchus could help to eliminate ethnic conflicts in areas already occupied by the Manchus, as well as help the Han Chinese forget their ancestral roots more easily.

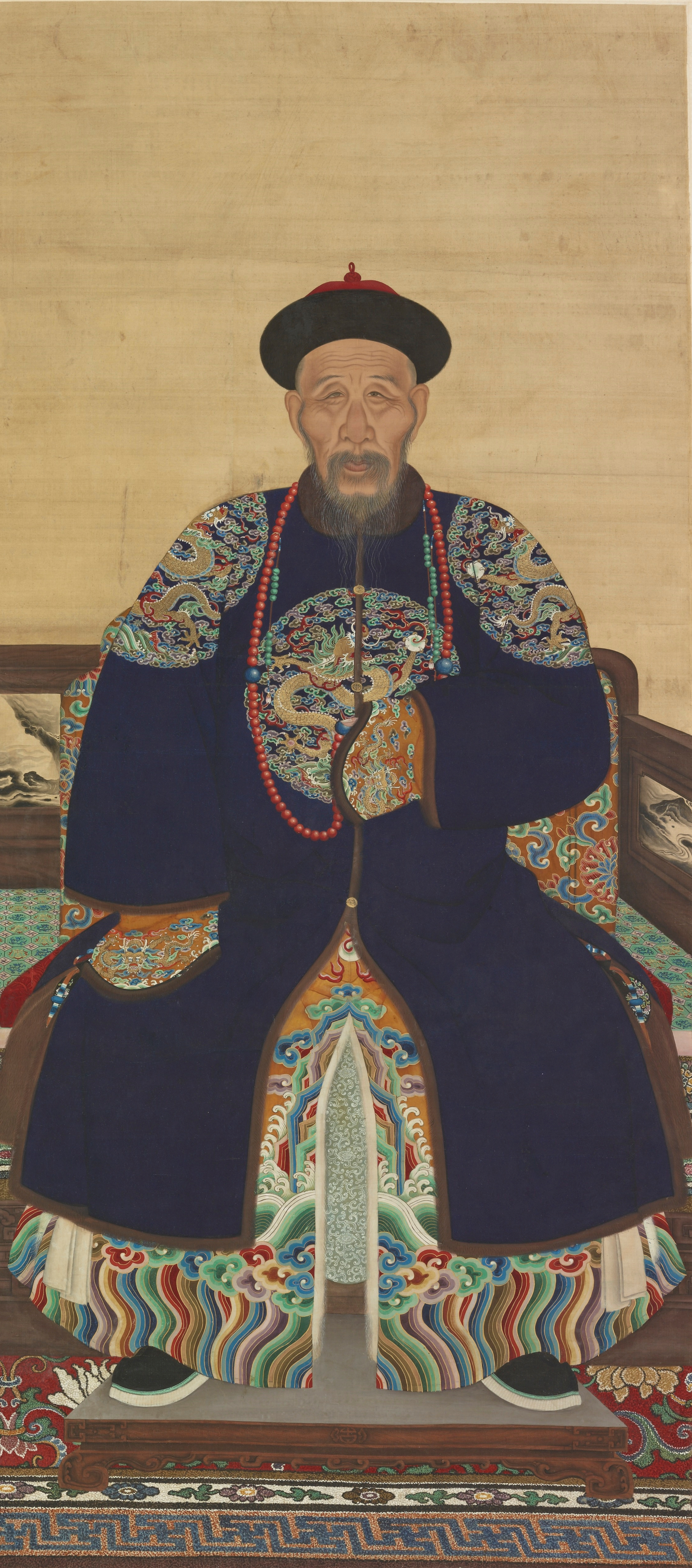
Portrait of Yunti, Prince Xun

Manchu noblewomen were also married to Han Chinese men who surrendered or defected to the Manchu side. Aisin Gioro women were married to the sons of the Han Chinese generals Sun Sike (孫思克), Geng Jimao, Shang Kexi and Wu Sangui. The e'fu (額駙) rank was given to husbands of Manchu princesses. Geng Zhongming, a Han bannerman, was awarded the title "Prince Jingnan", while his grandsons Geng Jingzhong, Geng Zhaozhong (耿昭忠) and Geng Juzhong (耿聚忠) married Hooge's daughter, Abatai's granddaughter, and Yolo's daughter respectively. Sun Sike's son, Sun Cheng'en (孫承恩), married the Kangxi Emperor's fourth daughter, Heshuo Princess Quejing (和硕悫靖公主).

=== Bordered Red Banner ===
Yishan's family was incorporated into the Bordered Red Banner, which was part of the "Lower Five Banners" of the Qing Dynasty, meaning they were not governed directly by the Emperor. The other four of the "Lower Five Banners" consisted of the Plain Red Banner, Bordered Blue Banner, Plain Blue Banner, and the Bordered White Banner, while the "Three Upper Banners" consisted of the Plain Yellow Banner, Bordered Yellow Banner, and Plain White Banner. The Bordered Red Banner was initially assigned for Daišan, Nurhaci's second son, but after Daišan's death, leadership was assigned to his sons Prince Yoto and Prince Soto.

== Early life ==
A portrait drawn by Qiu Ying of Imperial examination candidates awaiting the results for the exam

Yishan was born on 13 June 1790, towards the end of the Qianlong Emperor's reign. Whether he was born in Shenyang (called Mukden) or Beijing (called Peking) is debated among scholars. Due to his position as a member of a prestigious banner and ethnic lineage, Yishan had already received a position in the Qing bureaucracy by the time he was born. He was given the position "Feng'en Jiangjun" (奉恩將軍, "General Who Receives Grace") which entitled him to a stipend. Being a Manchu bannerman, Yishan's education was Manchu-centric.

During his childhood years, Yishan studied Manchu to fluency and Mandarin Chinese to high proficiency. He also trained rigorously in archery, becoming highly proficient. He was tutored in Chinese Confucian classics, and learnt the Four Books and Five Classics of Confucianism. His education mainly prepared him for future provincial administration, writing memorials, and understanding state ideology. He also mastered horsemanship and usage of weaponry like spears, swords, and bows. He also participated in military training. After his initial education, Yishan attended the Jiangshan High School, the official school established in Beijing for the education of imperial clansmen.

Yishan also had a Yin privilege, a system of where sons of high-ranking Qing officials were granted official titles or direct access to government posts by virtue of their father's status and service, as Yishan was a young nobleman and part of a banner. This also meant that Yishan did not need to take the standard Imperial examination, and was able to enter the bureaucracy without any examination at the age of 20.

== Career ==
=== Early Career and General of Ili (1810-1840) ===
==== Early Successes ====
After entering the bureaucracy in 1810, aged 20, Yishan was appointed as Deputy Lieutenant General of the Bordered Red Banner (鑲紅旗副都統). Each of the eight banners had two Lieutenant Generals (都統, dutong), assisted by Deputy Lieutenant Generals (副都統, fudutong), which Yishan was appointed of his own Bordered Red Banner. Being the Deputy Lieutenant General made Yishan responsible for the training, discipline, equipment, and readiness of the Bordered Red Banner Army. Yishan also oversaw households, appointment of hereditary positions, and distribution of rice and silver throughout the banner. Yishan held judicial authority, exercising jurisdiction over legal cases involving his banner personnel. Most notably, Yishan would also help organise sacrifices, parades, and imperial weddings on the Bordered Red Banner's behalf for the Emperor in Beijing. Yishan was appointed in this position from 1810 to 1821, and was appointed as a Lieutenant General from 1826 to 1828, where most of his tasks were similar to those he took on as Deputy Lieutenant General.

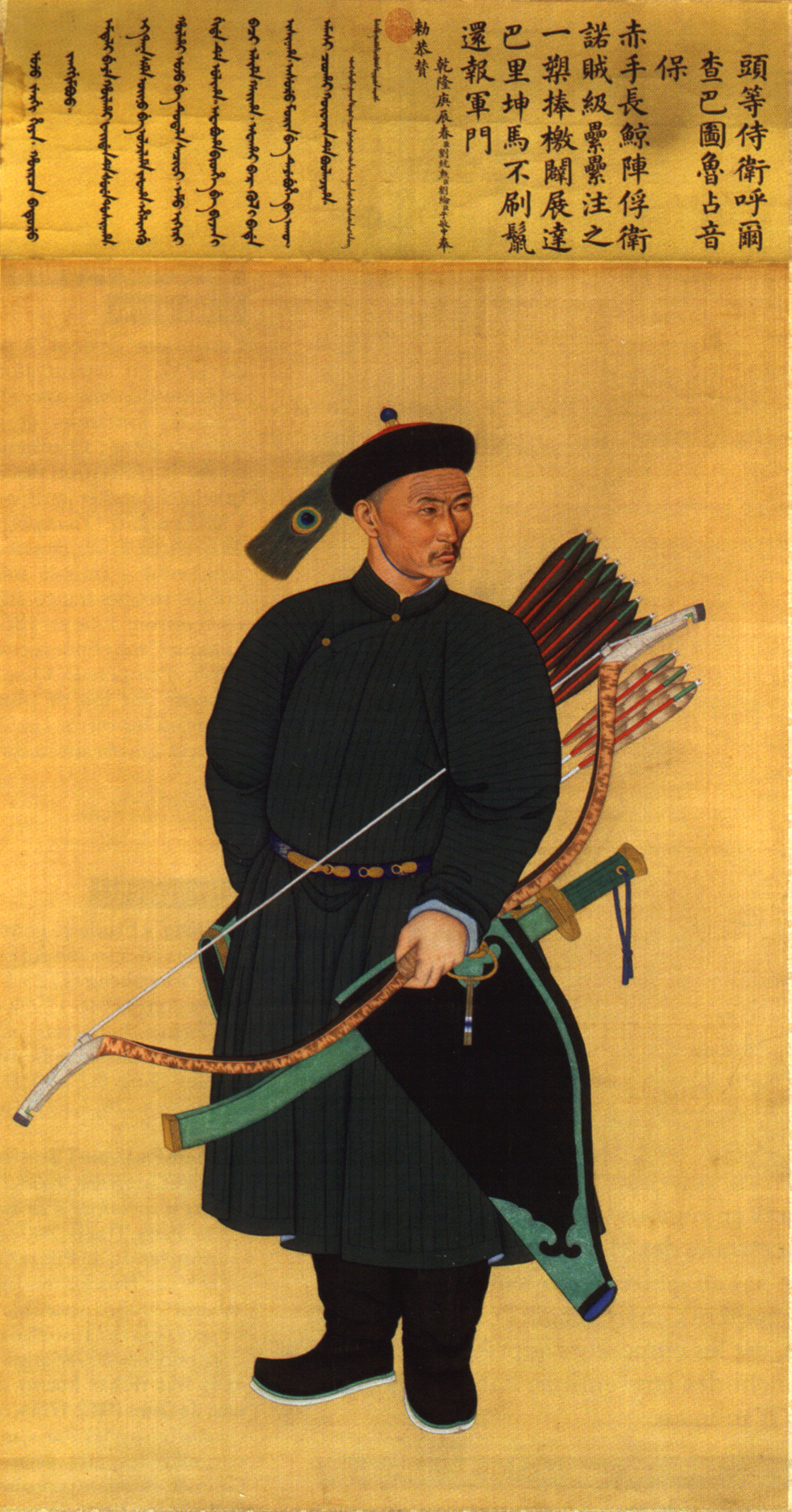
An Imperial bodyguard from the late 1700s

In 1821, the Daoguang Emperor inherited the Qing Dynasty throne from the Jiaqing Emperor, who had died, to become the Qing's seventh emperor and sixth to rule over China proper. He appointed and promoted Yishan to Imperial Bodyguard in the Forbidden City in Beijing, to serve as the emperor's bodyguard. Yishan also assisted in training Qing military recruits for the Green Standard Army. Yishan's appointment as imperial bodyguard acted as a strategic promotion, as service in the Imperial Bodyguard granted Yishan direct communication with the Daoguang Emperor. A position in the Imperial Bodyguard was reserved for the most trusted future officials, and it signaled that Yishan was marked for high office. Being part of the Imperial Bodyguard meant he was responsible for the personal security of the Emperor and the inner precincts of the Forbidden City. His routine duties included taking part in the highly ritualized guard rotations at the gates and halls of the Forbidden City and accompanying the Daoguang Emperor at all times inside the palace, even during imperial processions and ceremonies. Being part of the Imperial Bodyguard also allowed Yishan the role as a political apprentice. They overheard state discussions, learned court protocol and politics firsthand, and connected with other elite scions, senior officials, and eunuchs. Yishan left the Imperial bodyguard in 1826.

In 1828, after Yishan's term as Lieutenant General of the Bordered Red Banner ended, Yishan was appointed Vice Commander-in-Chief of the Tartar Garrison at Jingzhou, Hubei (荊州左翼副都統). Jingzhou was one of twelve interior cities comprised of a permanent Manchu Tartar Garrison (zhufang, 駐防), which was an island of military power used to suppress Han rebellions in the area. Jingzhou's Tartar Garrison consisted of a banner community consisting of approximately 6,000 soldiers and residents. As Vice Commander (左翼副都統, commanding the "Left Wing"), Yishan was second-in-command of the garrison. He mainly took charge in protecting and ensuring combat readiness in the Middle Yangtze Region, a volatile area in the Qing Dynasty, which would eventually be a big part in the early Taiping Rebellion three decades later. The Garrison was located at the centre of Jingzhou, so Yishan was required to manage schools, granaries, workshops, and walls between the garrison and the city itself, ensuring the garrison was self-sufficient through its allocated lands (qidi, 旗地). Yishan notably became a mediator between Qing officials in the garrison and Han civilians in urban Jingzhou.

Location of Suiyuan

In 1830, Yishan's term as Vice Commander-in-chief of the Jingzhou Tartar Garrison ended when the Daoguang Emperor claimed he was ready for an independent administration of a province or region. As a last bit of preparation, Yishan was briefly assigned a post as Acting General of Suiyuan (綏遠城將軍, 署理), which was located near Inner Mongolia. Suiyuan, like Jingzhou, contained a Tartar garrison, but, instead of oppressing Han rebellions, this Tartar garrison was used to manage Manchu-Mongol affairs and relations, especially with Outer Mongolia. In this acting role, Yishan supervised the Mongol Eight Banners, managed trade, managed diplomatic relations within Mongolia, and commanded the powerful Suiyuan garrison, a key component of the capital's northern defense perimeter.

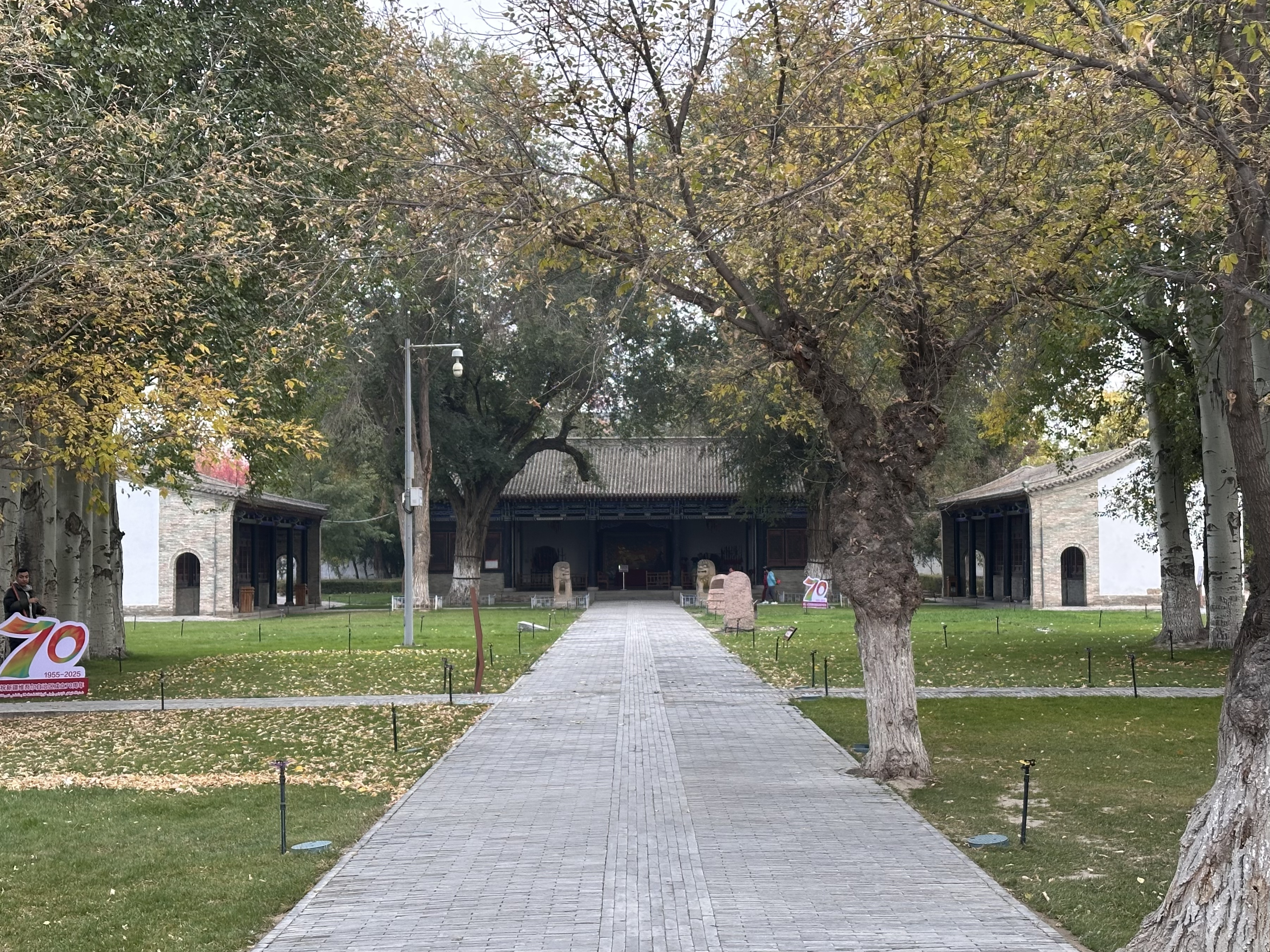
Former Mansion of General of Ili in Huocheng, Xinjiang

==== General of Ili ====
In late 1830, Yishan was appointed as General of Ili for his independent administration position. Ili was an autonomous prefecture in a region named Dzungaria (modern-day Xinjiang). Being appointed as General of Ili allowed Yishan to govern Ili Valley and much of Dzungaria. The position, created by the Qianlong Emperor during the Ten Great Campaigns and after the Dzungar–Qing Wars, was created to maintain security on the Qing's northwestern borders against threats like the Khanate of Kokand and Kazakh Khanate. The Dzungar region also contained political unrest, as the major populace of the region were ethnic Uyghurs and Dzungarians whom had lost their freedom after the Dzungar Khanate was defeated by the Qing in the early 18th century. Additionally, Yishan had to ensure Ili was self-sufficient through state-run military-agricultural colonies (tuntian 屯田), as supplies from China proper were considered extremely costly. Assisting Yishan in Ili were communities of Mongol and Manchu bannermen. Yishan commanded the Yili New and Old Manchu Eight Banners, the largest concentration of Qing infantry outside of Beijing, containing over 10,000 troops. His daily administration of the army involved drills, weapons maintenance, horse breeding (at the massive imperial stud farms near Ili), and fortification upkeep for the "Nine Cities of Ili", comprised of Yining (capital), Huocheng County, Zhaosu County, Tekes County, Gongliu County, Xinyuan County, Nileke, and Qapqal Xibe Autonomous County, sometimes also including Huiyuan and Shuiding. Furthermore, Yishan participated in border patrol, primarily overseeing internal affairs within the Khanate of Kokand. He monitored and prevented large-scale raids, intercepted fugitives, and monitored Kokandi activity, which was often tied to the Khoja descendants of the former rulers of Altishahr who were exiled to Kokand and sought to return.

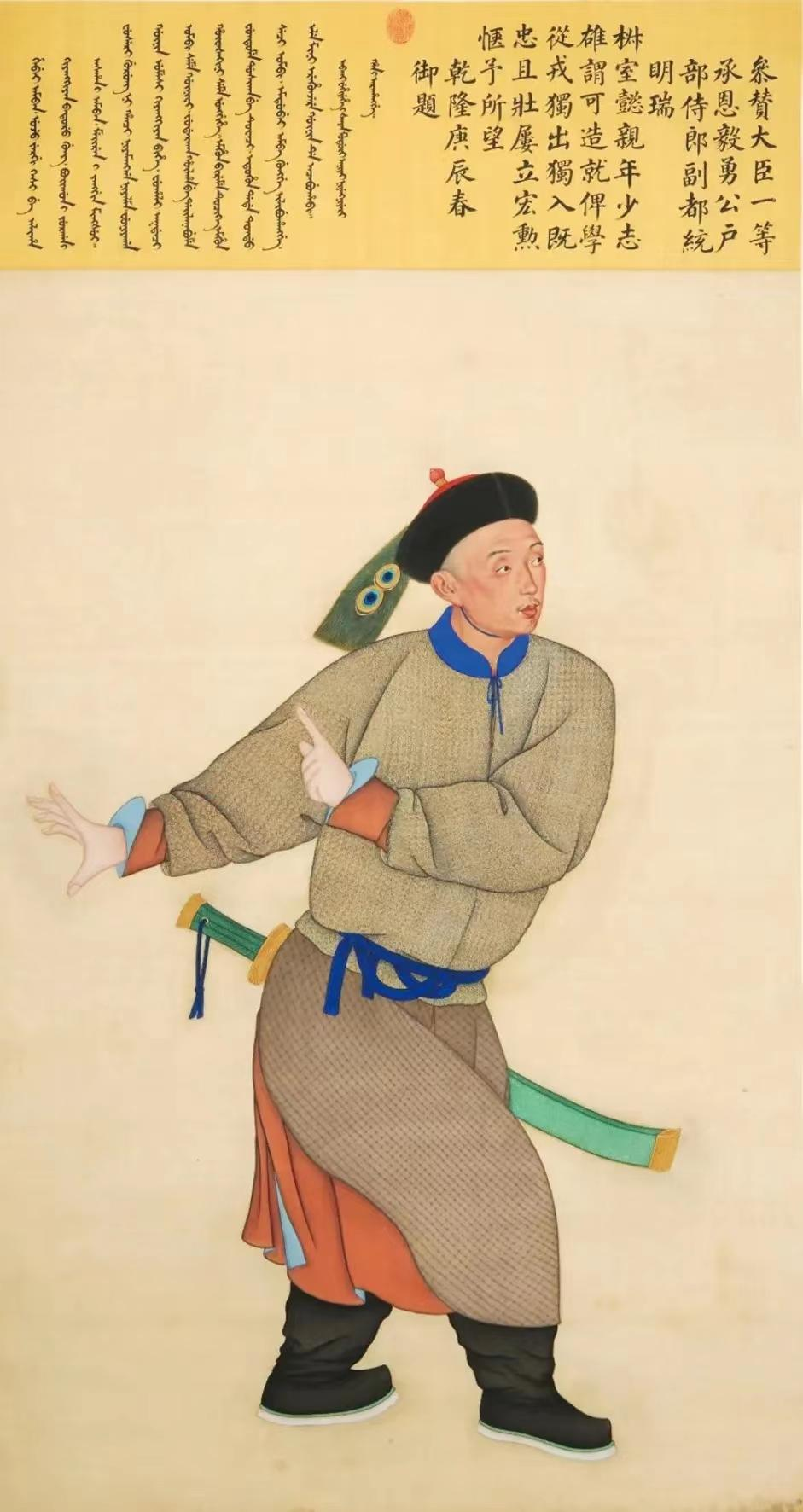
Mingrui, nephew of Qianlong Emperor, served as the first General of Ili

Alongside that, Yishan monitored the Tuntian System, which served as the economic administration of Ili. He did this through firstly allocating Banner soldiers and Green Standard Army soldiers to oversee the military colony system, and secondly managing land allocation, water rights, seed distribution, grain harvests, and storage in granaries. The Daoguang Emperor measured Yishan's success in this field through the self-sufficiency of Ili, and records showed that Yishan successfully maintained stable yields and granary reserves, preventing major shortages. Yishan also notably taxed Uyghurs who lived in the Ili Valley through grains. Despite the ethnic diversity in the region, no major rebellions occurred during Yishan's term as General of Ili.

Due to its distance from China proper, Ili was a region where many criminals, civilians, and failed Manchu officials would be exiled. Popular examples include officials like Lin Zexu, Ji Yun, and Hong Liangji. Therefore, Yishan was responsible for registering, assigning, and policing the exiled population. Moreover, Yishan managed banner welfare within Ili. On a negative note, Yishan consistently faced looming threats from the Khanate of Kokand, which had been supporting Jihadist Invasions of Qing territory in southern Ili. While the main theatre was south of the Tianshan Mountains (under the separate Kashgar Minister Councilor), the threat was interconnected to Yishan.

=== First Opium War (1839-1842) ===
In 1839, when the First Opium War began, Yishan was appointed by the Daoguang Emperor as a general of the Qing Imperial Army. From 1839 to 1840, he trained military recruits in Zhili, a northern administrative region in the Ming and Qing Dynasty comprising modern-day Beijing, Tianjin, Hebei, Western Liaoning, Northern Henan, and parts of Inner Mongolia, and Ili, before being called back to Beijing in late 1840. On February 27, 1841, Yishan was appointed as Imperial Commissioner to replace Qishan, who had been dismissed from the position and arrested for signing the Convention of Chuenpi in January 1841 without the Daoguang Emperor's permission. Yishan was also appointed as the Viceroy of Liangguang, permitting governance over Guangxi and Guangdong provinces, and thus terminating his term as General of Ili.

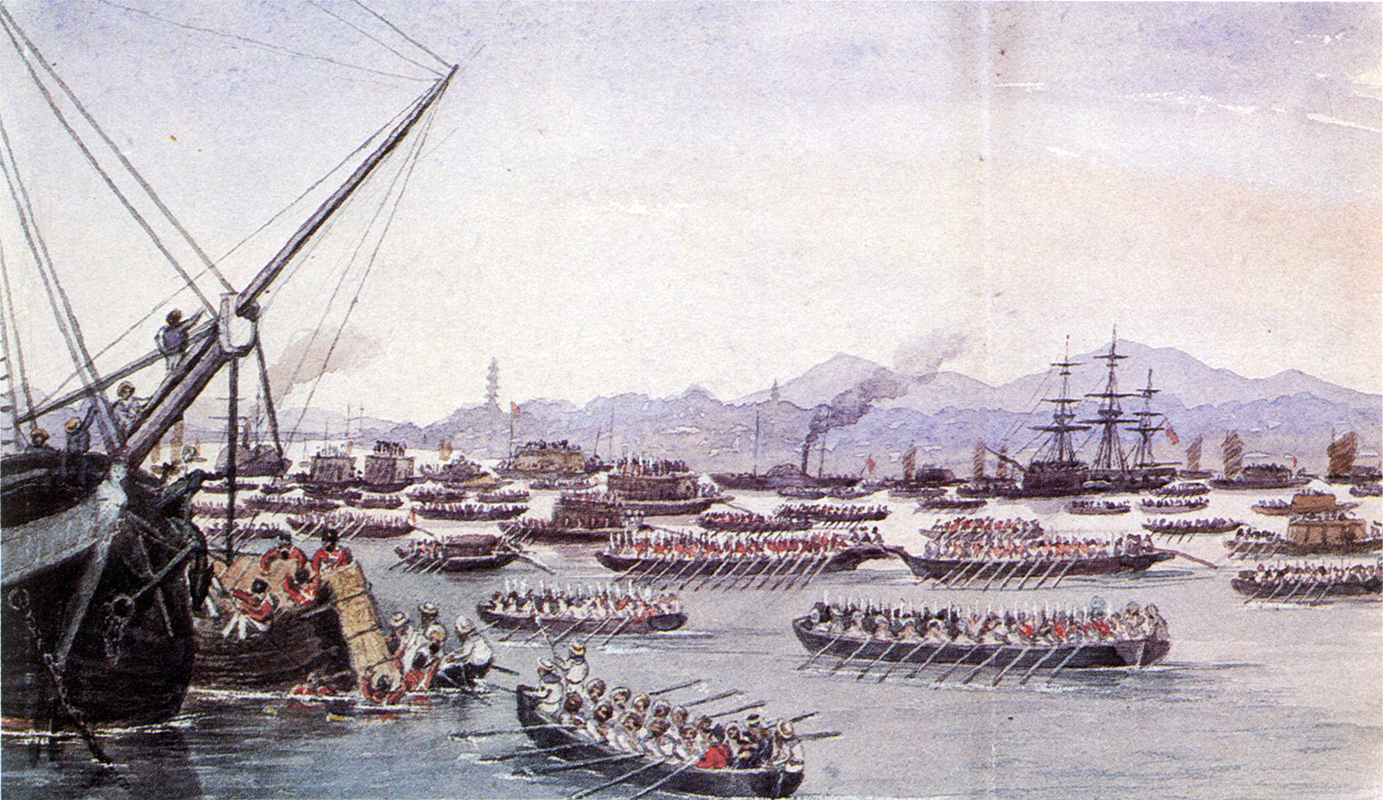
British ships in Pearl River approaching Guangzhou, moments before the beginning of the Battle of Canton

After his appointments, the Daoguang Emperor issued a mandate to Yishan: "annihilate the British forces and "wash away the national shame." The Qing Imperial Court then issued Yishan an army of Manchu Bannermen and Green Standard Army troops, totalling up to 17,000 soldiers from multiple provinces to battle the Royal Navy of the British Empire. In April 1841, Yishan arrived in Guangdong. At this point, Guangdong had been without an Imperial Commissioner present for two months since Qishan's dismissal, and their main military commandant, Guan Tianpei, had been dead since the end of February, leaving only Yang Fang and Yilibu as commanders present in Guangdong. Because of this lack of leadership, portions of Guangzhou and Macau had already fallen to the British. However, upon arrival, unlike the profound hope that people in Guangdong had anticipated in a new Imperial Commissioner, Yishan exhibited arrogant and ignorant behaviours, criticising the exceptional amount of defensive fortifications around Guangzhou while dismissing generals and civilians stating the fortifications were necessary, despite them observing British naval power firsthand. In one instance, Yishan openly criticised Fang, citing his cautious assessment as "wild talk to frighten people" and accused them of "a cowardly desire for peace." Yishan believed the British successes so far had been due to Qing mismanagement and "luck". To prepare for battle, Yishan travelled to Humen (called The Bogue in Britain) and reinforced defences there, despite it already being captured twice. He then hired local militias for night raids and fireboat attacks on the Pearl River. Yishan had a habit of relying on mystical tactics, frequently seeking divine assistance through sacrifices at temples. He also weirdly held a superstitious belief that flooding rice fields around Guangdong would stop British naval advance. Yishan also recruited inexperienced fresh recruits from Fujian to serve in his army instead of seasoned soldiers. He also spent his time partying with the officers.

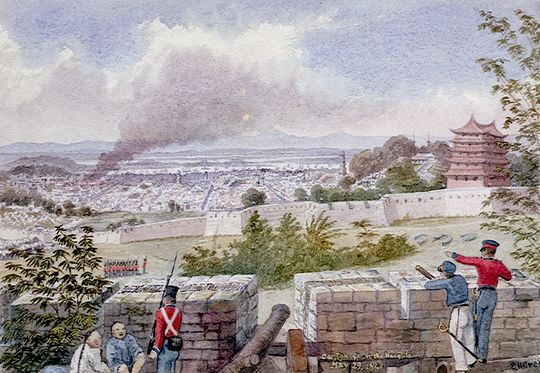
The British positioning cannons at Guangzhou

On May 21, 1841, the British, who were already aware of Yishan's preparations, launched an attack on The Bogue. The fortifications were destroyed in days, and the British navy continued north to continue their assault on Guangzhou. Despite Yishan rerouting land forces to Guangzhou, the British had captured hills north of Guangzhou by May 24 and positioned cannons towards the city. Despite being sent to annihilate the British, Yishan panicked and raised a white flag to signify surrender. He then sent a local merchant, Howqua, to negotiate with them. On May 27, Yishan presented the Convention of Canton to the British, a local ceasefire agreement where Yishan would pay $6 million Mexican pesos to the British to spare Guangzhou from bombardment and looting. The convention also required the British to withdraw 100 kilometers from Guangzhou, and to withdraw forces from The Bogue once payment was received. This was euphemistically called a "compensatory payment for commercial losses."

Knowing the Daoguang Emperor expected victory, Yishan filed a series of false victory memorials to the Qing Parliament. These memorials claimed that Yishan's army had killed thousands of British troops, including a fabricated "chief commander", the British were begging for mercy, the $6 million peso payment was from the British to the Qing, and that the British "kowtowed in submission and swore never to return to Guangdong." In response, the Daoguang Emperor was delighted, bestowing honours to Yishan. However, the Daoguang Emperor discovered the truth when the Treaty of the Bogue, which had been signed by Yilibu, arrived in Beijing. Enraged by Yishan's lies, the Daoguang Emperor stripped Yishan of all his titles, and he was arrested, brought to Beijing, and sentenced to death by beheading for "deceiving the emperor and losing the nation's morale." However, his death sentence was alleviated to imprisonment, and he was pardoned and released in 1842 when the First Opium War ended due to the signing of the Treaty of Nanking.

=== Rehabilitation and Appointments In Ili (1843-1855) ===
When Yishan was released, he was placed under dàizuì (待罪), meaning "awaiting assignment", which was a common process for a recently imprisoned Qing official, where they often stayed in Beijing and waited for assignments from the emperor. Yishan was promptly placed under house arrest during this process. Afterwards, he was assigned to second class imperial guard (二等侍衛) and acting banshi dachen (辦事大臣) of Khotan (an area within Xinjiang). In Xinjiang, Yishan was specifically assigned to Huiyuan, a city in Ili. In this position, Yishan was required to conduct logistical support, manage local military garrisons, and oversee military agricultural colonies. Due to his hindered reputation and competence in the First Opium War, this appointment was a junior appointment for Yishan to prove his diligence and loyalty in a harsh environment far from Beijing. By 1844, General of Ili, Buyantai, deemed Yishan's performances satisfactory. Being a practical administrator, Buyantai saw Yishan's aristocratic connections and in response, submitted positive reports regarding Yishan's performance to the Daoguang Emperor back in Beijing.

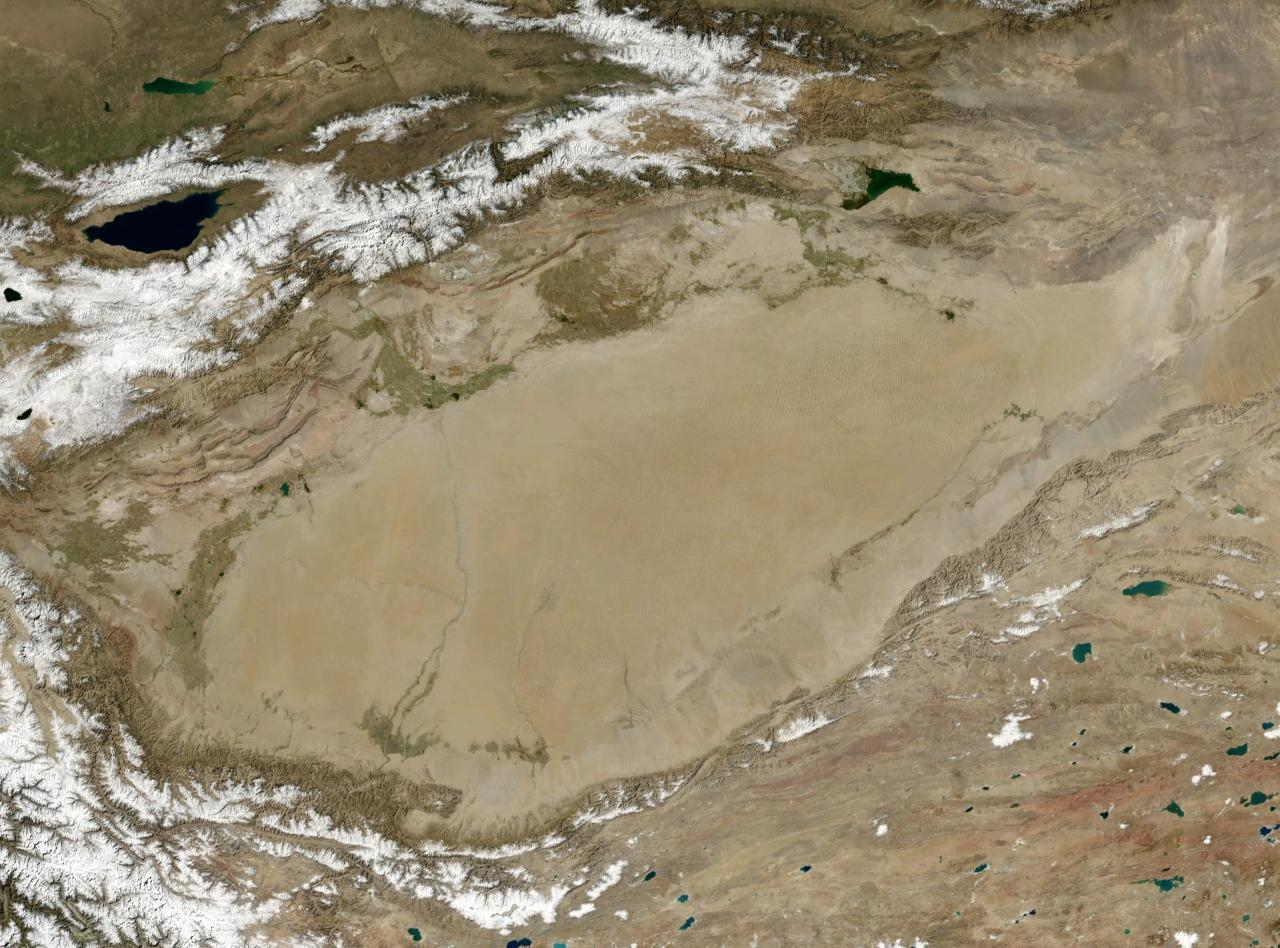
An image of the Tarim Basin

In 1845, General Buyantai was promoted to Viceroy of Shaan-Gan, leaving the General of Ili position briefly vacant. The Daoguang Emperor, needing a new General of Ili, turned to the Qing Imperial Court. From the reports issued by Buyantai and Yishan's past history of managing Ili, the court came to a conclusion that it would be best if Yishan was appointed General of Ili. In April 1845, the Daoguang Emperor issued an edict to Yishan, informing him of his new appointment as General of Ili for a second term and Superintendent of Tarim Basin Affairs. He was awarded the rank of a first class zhenguo jiangjun, the fourth-lowest tier in the Qing dynasty's hierarchy of noble ranks.

After Yishan's first term in Ili ended in 1840, Buyantai's five years of management had caused instabilities in Xinjiang and Ili. Back in 1828, a southern section of Xinjiang bordering modern-day Kyrgyzstan and Tajikistan named Kashgaria was conquered by Jahangir Khoja, causing instability in the region, and that instability had spread to Ili in the North, making Yishan's second term much more difficult than his first, where the instability had been contained in Southern Xinjiang. Furthermore, the Russian conquest of Central Asia also caused rising tensions in Ili.

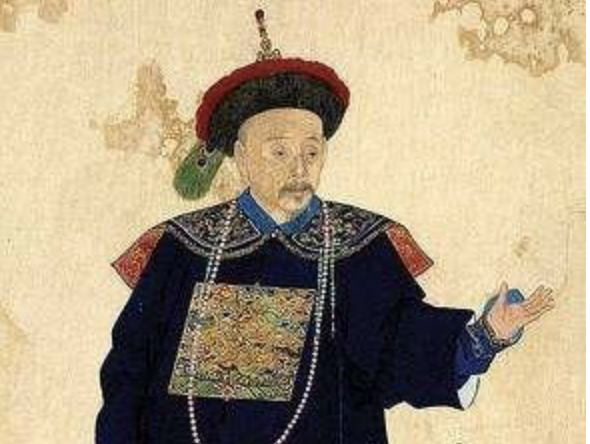
A portrait of Yishan in 1849, during his tenure in Ili

After Yishan's appointment, he was assigned to oversee Ili's military system comprising Manchu banner armies, Green Standard Army troops, and Mongolian Armed Forces. He also reinforced Huiyuan and the Tarbagatai Mountains, often romanized as Da'erbahatai, a mountain range on the Qing-Kazakh Border. Due to the Russian expansion into Central Asia, Yishan stationed troops on Da'erbahatai to supervise Russian expansion. Like his first term in Ili, Yishan continued the tuntian (屯田) process, using soldiers and Han Chinese migrants to cultivate state-owned land. Yishan then launched a water conservation campaign, dedicating projects to repairing waterways, including the Ili River, between Ili and other Qing provinces and other countries. The campaign was launched to sustain agriculture, and as Ili and Xinjiang were landlocked, agriculture was extremely important and necessary for sufficient food for civilians living in Ili and Xinjiang. Outside of Qing China, Yishan often visited Central Asia for negotiations and discussions with Kazakh and Kyrgyz chiefs, and also with high-ranking officials of the Kokand Khanate. To ensure border security for the northwestern Qing, Yishan often granted titles, traded livestock, and mediated disputes to keep the Central Asian tribes allied. Furthermore, as the Russians began expanding into Central Asia, many Russian merchants began sneaking into Qing territory to hunt for animals, resulting in Yishan banning any form of sneaking or smuggling into the Qing Dynasty. From 1845 to 1855, many sudden uprisings occurred all over Ili and Xinjiang, led by a group of uyghurs named the Taranchi, a Mongolian word for "farmer". Yishan suppressed the rebellions and uprisings in typical Qing fashion, which involved using Green Standard Army troops as brute force to oppress the protests. Despite Yishan's efforts however, the Taranchi would eventually cause the Dungan Revolt after his tenure ended, from 1862 to 1877.

In 1849, due to the immense economic damage from the First Opium War, Yishan's administration in Ili was accused of embezzling military funds and exploiting local resources, similar to many other Qing officials. However, no major scandal erupted during his tenure.

==== Relationship with Lin Zexu ====
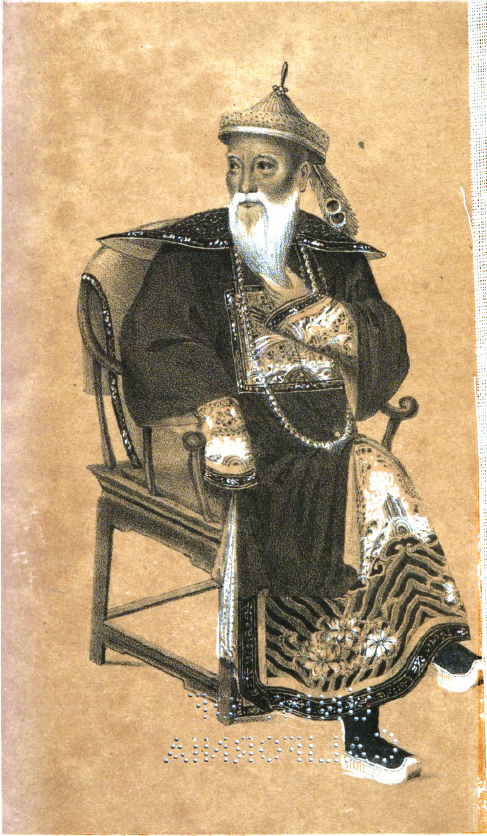
An 1843 Drawing of Lin Zexu in Ili

Yishan and Lin Zexu crossed paths when the former was managing Ili from 1845 to 1855 and Lin was exiled there until his death in 1850. Lin was a Han Chinese scholar and Qing official from Fujian, known for his integrity, competence, and perseverance. Being the Imperial Commissioner who confiscated 1,018 tons of Opium in Humen, Lin was responsible for starting the First Opium War, the war that caused Yishan to get arrested.

When Lin first arrived in Ili in 1843, he was placed under the jurisdiction of Buyantai and Yishan, who were governing the area. Buyantai quickly began to favour Lin, as he contributed significantly to local water conservancy and irrigation projects (most famously around the Khorgos and Tarim River areas), surveyed lands for tuntian (military farms), and advised on border defence. When Yishan inherited Buyantai's position in 1845, Lin and Yishan's relationship expressed resentment. Lin, the principled hero, was in exile. Yishan, the author of the Treaty of Canton, was there on a path to rehabilitation.

==== Treaty of Kulja ====
After the Kazakh Khanate collapsed in 1847 at the hands of the Russian Empire, the Russians wanted to formalise trade and borders between them and the Qing Dynasty. In June 1851, Russian officials and representatives Ivan Zakharov and Yegor Kovalevsky arrived in Xinjiang to prepare for negotiations with the Qing Dynasty, the latter of which having travelled to China two years prior for the thirteenth Russian Spiritual Mission in Beijing. In response, the newly inherited Xianfeng Emperor of the Qing Dynasty sent Yishan and Buyantai as representatives for the Qing Dynasty during negotiations. When negotiating, Zakharov and Kovalevsky expressed the terms of their treaty: to open up three cities, Kulja, Chuguchak, and Kashgaria (also known today as Yining, Tacheng, and Kashgar) to Sino–Russian trade, with a 5% ad valorem tariff on Russian goods and also granted the Russians legal immunity under consular jurisdiction. The Russians wanted the new treaty to be based on the earlier Treaty of Kyakhta, which was signed in 1727. In conclusion, Yishan agreed to almost all the Russian terms, except for trade in Kashgar. On 6 August 1851, Zakharov, Kovalevsky, Yishan, and Buyantai signed the Treaty of Kulja, and thus allowing trade between the Russian Empire and the Qing Dynasty.

=== Tenure in Heilongjiang (1855-1860) ===
In 1855, Yishan was reassigned from Ili to serve as Viceroy of the Three Eastern Provinces in Manchuria, consisting of governing Fengtian Province, Jilin Province, and Heilongjiang Province, known today as Jilin, Heilongjiang and the central and eastern parts of Liaoning. During his five-year tenure, Yishan mainly managed Heilongjiang (黑龍江將軍).

Upon arriving in Heilongjiang, Yishan was almost immediately notified of suspicious Russian activities on the Qing-Russian Border. Nikolay Muravyov-Amursky, the general governor of Eastern Siberia, had been caught exploring, colonizing, and establishing military posts along the Amur River since the late 1840s, violating the earlier Treaty of Nerchinsk, the first treaty signed between the Qing Dynasty and the Tsardom of Russia in 1689. Despite this however, earlier viceroys had not put attention into this violation, due to a shortage of troops in Heilongjiang because of the Taiping Rebellion, Nian Rebellion, and rising tensions between the Qing, the British, and the French. Yishan was then issued a mandate by the Xianfeng Emperor to monitor Russian movements, avoid conflict, and forbid Russian settlement. However, the Qing Imperial Court did not issue Yishan an army. Without an army and needing to respond to Russian activities in the Amur, Yishan adopted a defensive, bureaucratic approach, filing reports on Russian activities and sending it to Beijing, and not responding to any Russian activities with military action. After filing many reports, Yishan met Muravyov, and appealed to the Treaty of Nerchinski, to which Muravyov ignored. However, during the Second Opium War which lasted from 1857 to 1860, Muravyov approached Yishan and offered to provide Russian assistance to the Qing Dynasty against the British and French, in return for redefining the Qing-Russian border along the Amur and Ussuri rivers.

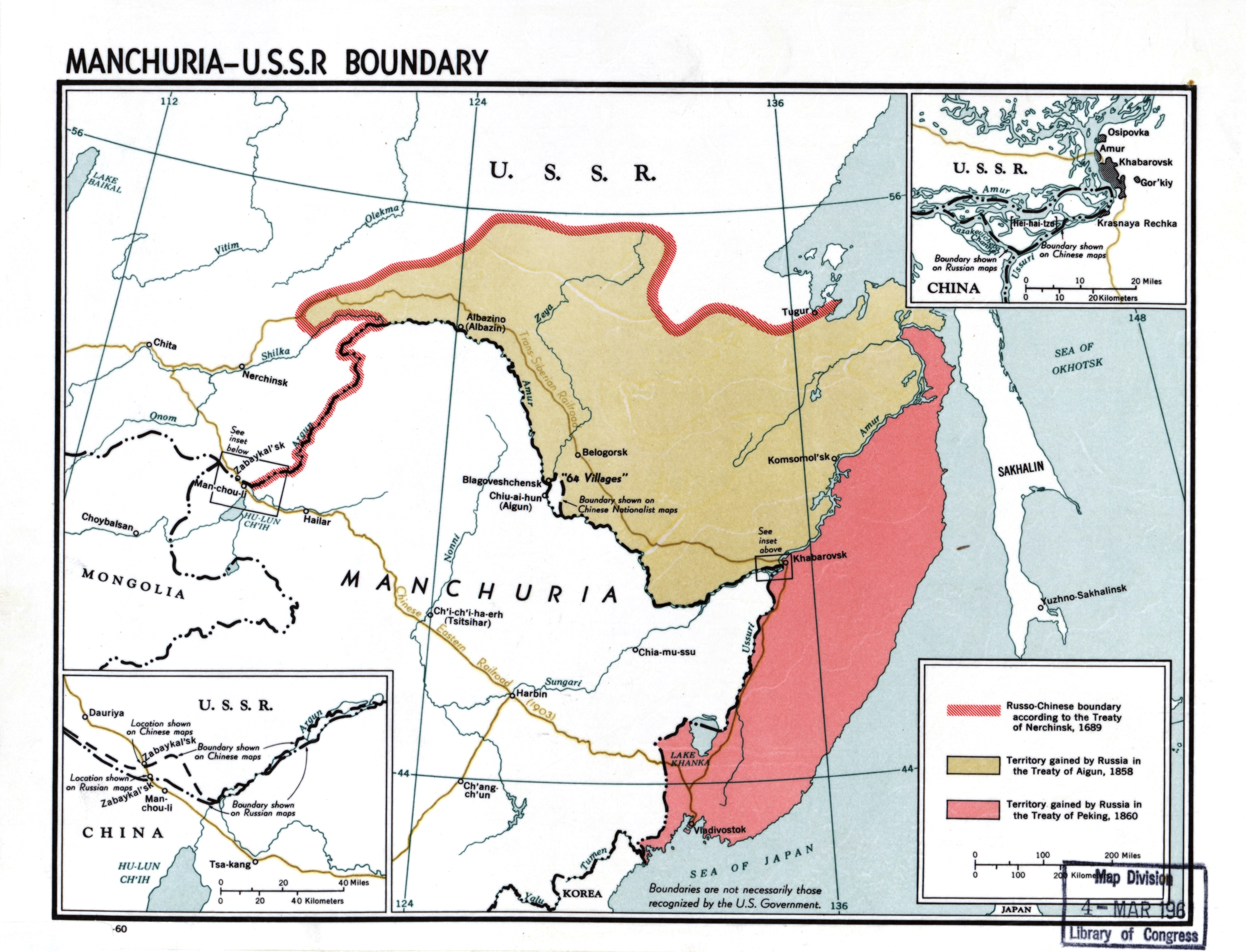
Qing-Russian border after the Treaty of Aigun and Amur Annexation in 1858 and 1860

==== Treaty of Aigun ====
Unlike what the Qing had expected however, the Russians sent no military assistance, and, in May 1858, Muravyov arrived in Aigun, a town in northern Manchuria, with gunboats and troops, demanding their negotiation border revision. When Yishan arrived, he argued that the Russian Empire had sent no military aid to the Qing, to which the Russians retaliated by also putting up a display of their military power by firing artillery shells along the Amur River. The Qing dynasty agreed to enter negotiations with Russia. Yishan, with limited military personnel and terrified of starting another war, decided to agree to border negotiations. After several days of talks, Yishan and Muravyov signed the Treaty of Aigun (《瑷珲条约》) on May 28, 1858. The treaty determined that the Russian Empire would annex all land north of the Amur River (approx. 600,000 km^{2}, which had been under Qing jurisdiction but not densely populated), The territory east of the Ussuri River to the sea (Primorsky Krai) was declared a Sino-Russian condominium (joint administration), and that the Russians were allowed to trade along the Amur and Sungari rivers. As for the Qing, land south of the Amur and Manchuria remained under Qing control.

After the signing of the treaty, the Xianfeng Emperor was enraged and rejected the treaty. He had Yishan dismissed from office as Viceroy of the Three Eastern Provinces, and he was sent back to Beijing, despite his attempts to explain himself. Two years later in 1860, the Russians intervened in the Convention of Peking (which ended the Second Opium War), and forced the Qing Dynasty to recognize the Russian gains under the Treaty of Aigun and further cede its territories east of the Ussuri River, including Sakhalin, to them. This became known as the Amur Annexation. (Russia gained sole control of this land two years later.)

== Retirement ==
The great seal of the Imperial Clan Court

Aged 70 and having a tarnished record, Yishan was appointed as a member of the Qing Imperial Court in 1860, which was typical for aged Qing officials. The Qing Imperial Court managed the affairs of the Aisin-Gioro family—genealogies, stipends, discipline, and ceremonies, but did not possess any form of military strength or administrative power. Yishan was awarded the titles "Grand Minister of State" and "Grand Guardian" as a result.

== Death and Legacy ==
Yishan died of illness in Beijing on 30 June 1878, during the reign of the Guangxu Emperor. He was 88. Yishan was not granted a posthumous name.

In modern times, Yishan's legacy is defined by two of the most consequential diplomatic and territorial failures in the late Qing Dynasty: failure to defend Guangzhou in the First Opium War, and ceding over one million square kilometers of territory to the Russian Empire through the signings of the Treaty of Kulja and the Treaty of Aigun. He is often remembered as an incompetent official, and a symbol of the Qing Dynasty's governmental decay in the 19th century. Historians often cite Yishan as an example of how governmental corruption and irrelevant military strategies led to the Collapse of the Qing Dynasty and the start of the Century of humiliation in China.

=== In China ===
In People's Republic of China, Yishan is known in connection with the Opium Wars, and also the cession of Outer Manchuria to Russia. He also appears frequently in books regarding the unequal treaties, a series of treaties imposed on the Qing Dynasty from western powers. Yishan was involved in the Convention of Peking, Treaty of Nanking, Treaty of Aigun, and the Treaty of Tientsin. Yishan is mentioned frequently in the historiography of the Century of Humiliation, with his legacy being uniformly negative and serving specific state-sponsored narratives.

The most significant modern-day effect of Yishan on China is his signing of the Treaty of Aigun. As of 2026, China and Russia remain allies, but the cession of territories north of the Amur River are still historically significant and remembered by both nations, with the Chinese Communist Party (CCP) using the loss to emphasise territorial integrity as a sacred principle, reinforcing their De facto claims over Taiwan, Hong Kong, Macau, and the South China Sea. Furthermore, his repeated rehabilitation despite failure is used to critique the old feudal system, contrasting it with the CCP's professed (though contested) meritocracy and anti-corruption drives.

=== In Taiwan ===
In Taiwan, or the Republic of China, Yishan's legacy is perceived with both traditional Chinese and distinct Taiwanese perspectives. In traditional Chinese historiography maintained by institutions like Academia Sinica, an assessment of Yishan's career concludes that he is a failed official. However, the focus is mainly on the Qing Government's failure instead of him individually. From a Taiwanese nationalist or pro-independence perspective, Yishan is often perceived as a good example of "alien rule", as the Qing Dynasty was made up of Manchurians, making disastrous decisions for China proper. This can be used to parallel arguments against unified governance from Beijing, suggesting that distant, unaccountable powers make poor decisions for local people.

In the general public however, he is far less known in Taiwan than in Mainland China due to Taiwan's focus on their own history and historical figures, with individuals like Sun Yat-sen and Chiang Kai-Shek overshadowing him. In September 2024, the President of the Republic of China (Taiwan) Lai Ching-te claimed that if China's claims on Taiwan are about territorial integrity then it should also take back land from Russia signed over by the last Chinese dynasty in the 19th century, mentioning the treaty.

=== In Britain and Russia ===
In British historiography, Yishan is considered a minor part of their history, only appearing during the First Opium War, appearing in specialist military and diplomatic history as an ineffective Qing commander. He is often contrasted with more determined Qing officials like Lin Zexu or British figures like Charles Elliot and Henry Pottinger. However, he has no presence in public memory. The Opium Wars themselves are not widely taught or remembered in the UK, and when they are, the focus is on British policy and Chinese resistance, meaning Yishan is not widely known in the United Kingdom without extensive research.

In Russia, Yishan is remembered positively but quietly as a facilitator of Russian geopolitical success, being a named figure in histories of Russian expansion in the Far East. The Treaty of Aigun is celebrated as a major diplomatic achievement by Muravyov, who is seen to have outmaneuvered Yishan. Yishan is portrayed as weak and pliable, a representation of a declining Qing Dynasty in the 19th century.

In cities like Khabarovsk and Blagoveshchensk (founded on territory ceded by the treaty), historical markers celebrate Muravyov, not Yishan. However, Yishan's concession is the foundational act enabling their existence, with modern Russian history treating the treaty as a legally settled, fair accomplishment. Discussing Yishan's incompetence reinforces the narrative of Russia's legitimate and peaceful acquisition of the Amur region.

In television and film, Yishan is mostly portrayed as a cowardly official or secondary antagonist. In The Opium War, a 1997 Chinese television show about the opium wars, Yishan is seen as a fumbling official who panics when meeting the British.

== Personal life ==
Yishan had at least three known sons, Zhen'guo (鎮國), Zai'e, and Zaizhuo. Zai'e was born in 1814 and died in 1834, aged 20. Zaizhuo served as Vice Minister of the Court of Imperial Sacrifices, and he was born in 1818 and died in 1877, aged 59.

Zaizhuo's son, Pu Han, was the Deputy Commander of the Bordered Yellow Banner Mongol Army; his grandson, Yu Zhao, was a First-Class General of the State.

== See also ==
- Yunti, Prince Xun
- Prince Xun (恂)
- Royal and noble ranks of the Qing dynasty
