= Buyantai =

Official of Qing China (1791–1880)

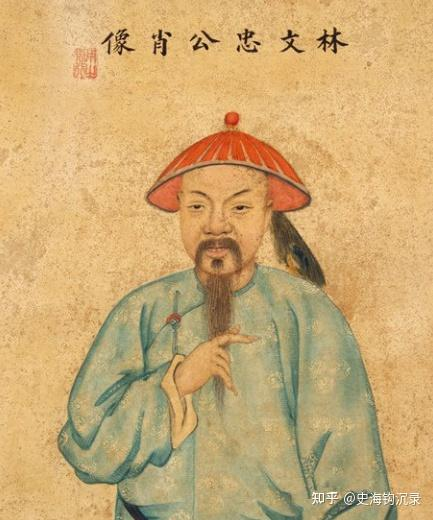
- Official portrait, 1837

Personal details
- Born: 1791 Beijing
- Died: 1880 (aged 88–89) Beijing
- Education: Beijing banner school
- Occupation: Politician, military commander

Military service
- Battles/wars: Afaqi Khoja revolts

Buyantai (Mandarin Chinese: 布彥泰, Manchu: ᠪᡠᠶᠠᠨᡨᠠᡳ, Möllendorf: Buyantai; 1791–1880), courtesy name Ziqian, was a Manchu and Mongol official of the Qing Dynasty of China. He was from the Borjigit clan, and was part of the Plain Yellow Banner of the Manchu Eight Banners. He is perceived as one of the most competent and effective Qing governors during the reign of the Daoguang Emperor, due to his pragmatic governance, agricultural development, and astute personnel management in Xinjiang. He is known for his term in Ili as General of Ili, and his negotiations with Ivan Zakharov and Yegor Kovalevsky of the Russian Empire alongside Yishan in 1851 which resulted in the signature of the Treaty of Kulja.

Buyantai is also known for his close connection with Lin Zexu, a Han Chinese scholar and Qing official known for starting the First Opium War by burning 1,018 tons of opium in Humen. They met when Lin was exiled to Xinjiang in 1843.

== Ancestry ==
Buyantai was part of the Borjigit (博尔济吉特氏; Bó'ěrjìjítè shì) clan and he and his family belonged to the Plain Yellow Banner (正黄旗; Xiāng Huáng Qí) of the Eight Banners of the Qing Dynasty. The Borjigit clan was seen as one of the most prestigious and powerful lineages of Inner Asia, as it was the clan of infamous Mongol leader Genghis Khan. Buyantai's Borjigit clan was incorporated into the Qing Dynasty through a strategic alliance between the Mongols and the Manchu people. During the rise of the Manchus under Nurhaci and Hong Taiji, the first and second emperors of the Later Jin Empire in the early 17th century, forming alliances with Mongol tribes was a strategic imperative to avoid a two-front war against the Ming dynasty and the Mongols. The Manchu Aisin Gioro clan actively intermarried with Buyantai's Borjigit nobility to secure this alliance.

Official banner of the Plain Yellow Banner

According to the Secret History of the Mongols, the first Mongol was born from the union of a blue-grey wolf and a fallow doe. Their 11th generation descendent, Alan Gua, was impregnated by a ray of light and gave birth to five sons, the youngest being Bodonchar Munkhag, progenitor of the Borjigids. According to Rashid al-Din Hamadani, many of the older Mongolian tribes were founded by members of the Borjigin clan, including the Barlas, Urud, Manghud, Taichiud, Chonos, and Kiyat. Bodonchar's descendant Khabul Khan founded the Khamag Mongol confederation around 1131. His great-grandson Temüjin ruled the Khamag Mongol and unified the other Mongol tribes under him. He was declared Genghis Khan in 1206, thus establishing the Mongol Empire. His descendants are the Chinggisids.

The etymology of the word Borjigin is uncertain. Members of the Borjigin clan ruled over the Mongol Empire, dominating large lands stretching from Java to Iran and from Mainland Southeast Asia to Novgorod in northwestern Russia. Many of the ruling dynasties that took power following the disintegration of the Mongol Empire were of Chinggisid, and thus Borjigid, ancestry. These included the Chobanids, the Jalayirid Sultanate, the Barlas, the Manghud, the Khongirad, and the Oirats. In 1368, the Borjigid Yuan dynasty of China was overthrown by the Ming dynasty. Members of this family continued to rule over north China and the Mongolian Plateau into the 17th century as the Northern Yuan. Descendants of Genghis Khan's brothers Qasar and Belgutei surrendered to the Ming in the 1380s. By 1470, the Borjigids' power had been severely weakened, and the Mongolian Plateau was on the verge of chaos.

== Early life ==
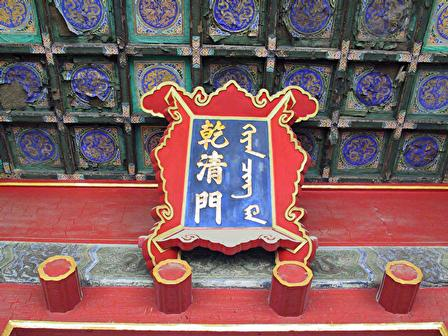
Plaque at the Forbidden City in Beijing, in both Mandarin Chinese (left, 乾清門; qián qīng mén) and Manchu (right, kiyan cing men)

Buyantai was born in 1791, during the final years of the Qianlong Emperor's reign and the end of the High-Qing Period, a period of financial stability and military strength for the Qing. Being a child of a banner, Buyantai's education was bilingual and bicultural.

The Qing Dynasty had established official banner schools in Beijing, which Buyantai attended. During his early years, Buyantai became fluent in Manchu as it was the national language of the Qing Dynasty, and the language was important for communication within the banner system and for handling government documents in the future. Fluency was also essential for handling military reports and confidential edicts. He consistently practiced translating text from Mandarin Chinese to Manchu, and he was well-educated in discipline, learning archery and horsemanship. Under private tutors, Buyantai studied the Four Books and Five Classics of Confucianism, an important aspect of traditional Chinese education.

In his early career, Buyantai also had a Yin privilege, a system of where sons of high-ranking Qing officials were granted official titles or direct access to government posts by virtue of their father's status and service, as Buyantai was a young nobleman and part of a banner. This also meant that Buyantai did not need to take the standard Imperial examination, and could instead enter the Qing bureaucracy automatically.

== Early career ==
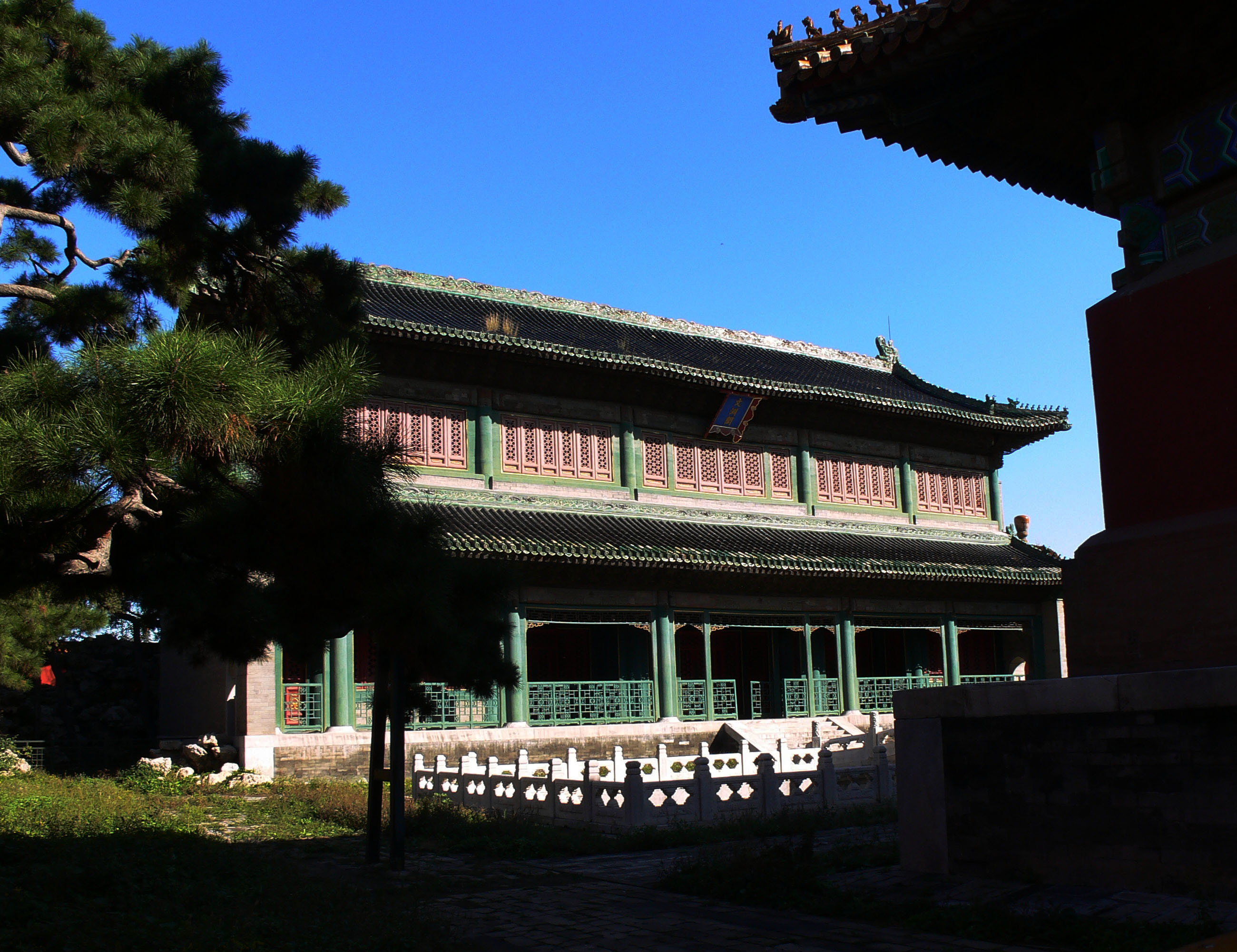
Wenyuan Chamber in Forbidden City, Beijing, the imperial library in Ming and Qing dynasties where Grand Secretariats often worked

In 1807, Buyantai entered the Qing bureaucracy and was appointed Secretary of the Grand Secretariat (內閣中書). The Grand Secretariat was the highest central administrative position, responsible for drafting imperial edicts, and processing government documents between the Qing emperor and the Qing Imperial Court. The secretary however, was a significantly lower ranking position. It held a 7A rank in the bureaucracy, which was comparable to that of a county magistrate. However, for a newly appointed official of the bureaucracy, Buyantai was at a respectable position. The position as secretary itself, alongside the Grand Secretariat, was founded by the Hongwu Emperor in 1380, during the existence of the Ming Dynasty. The position gradually evolved into an effective coordinating organ superimposed on the Three Departments and Six Ministries, and was adopted by the Qing Dynasty. As the secretary, Buyantai drafted imperial edicts and other state papers in Manchu and Mandarin Chinese. Buyantai also completed archival work, registering and retrieving documents from the secretariat's archives. As a young Manchu noble, the appointment into this position served as a strategic apprenticeship for Buyantai, marking him for high office through providing overviews of National affairs in the Qing Dynasty and between officials and the emperor. Unlike other appointments that served as clerical jobs for low-ranking officials, the secretary of the Grand Secretariat required knowledge in bureaucratic, formal language in both Manchu and Mandarin Chinese. The appointment was the typical first post for Manchus entering the bureaucracy with the Yin privilege, marking their formal induction into the civil service before being tested in provincial or frontier assignments. He left this post in 1820, becoming a commander in Xinjiang.

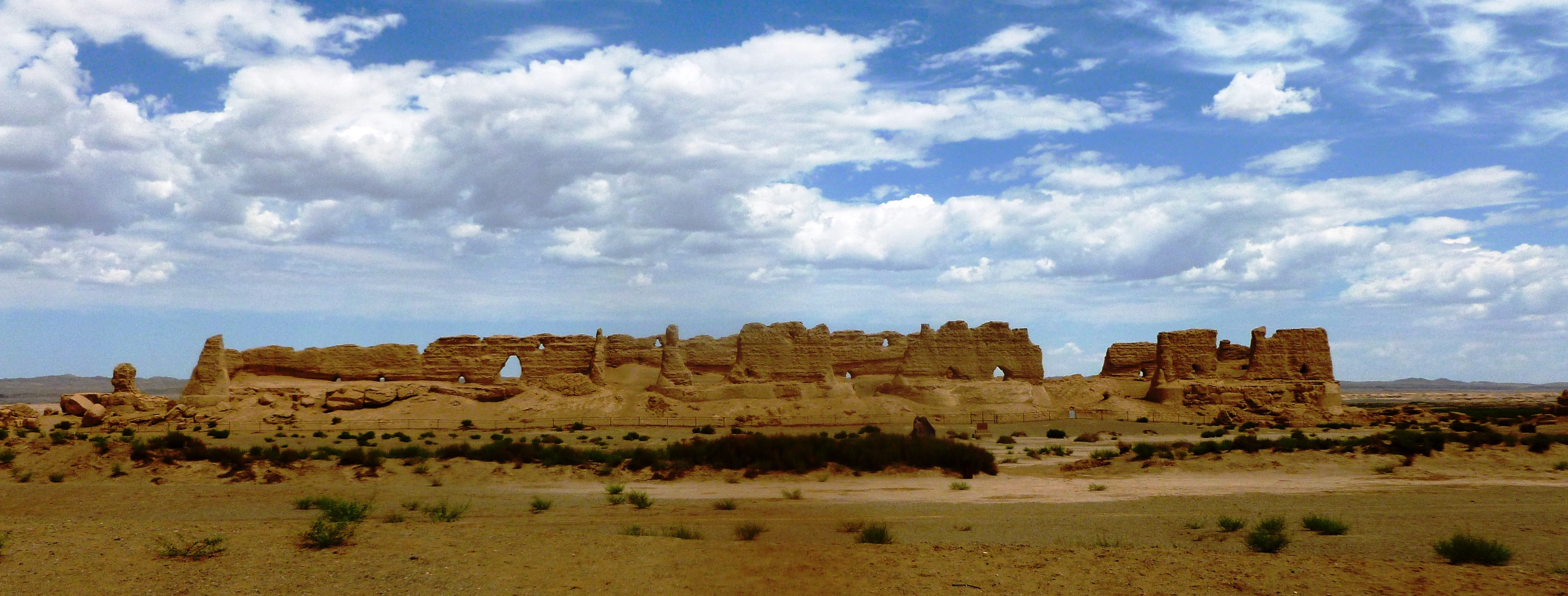
Granary on Silk Road in Liangzhou that Buyantai supervised

In 1828, Buyantai was appointed as a Grand coordinator and provincial governor of eastern Gansu, primarily the Liangzhou-Ganzhou corridor, modern-day Wuwei-Zhangye-Jiuquan region. This appointment allowed Buyantai to transition military logistics officer to a provincial governor. The region was also extremely important, as it was the corridor connecting China proper to Western China, including provinces like Tibet, Xinjiang, and Anhui. First of the two, Buyantai managed Liangzhou with responsibilities like granary management, Hui relations, and support for banners. Liangzhou contained one of the largest granary complexes in Northwestern China, and Buyantai was responsible for stockpiling tax grain shipped from the east for transshipment westward. Furthermore, Liangzhou had a huge Hui population, so Buyantai had to take on the challenge of maintaining peace between Han Chinese people and Hui people. Liangzhou also had a Manchu banner garrison, and the prefect coordinated civilian support for the garrison's needs. In 1830, Buyantai's governance over the region spread to Ganzhou, a prefecture-level city near Liangzhou. He received new responsibilities following the appointment, including coordinating regional logistics, as Buyantai was now in complete control of the grain, silver, and military conscriptions that passed through the area from China proper to Western China or vice-versa. Buyantai also famously supervised the Yumen Pass, which served as a symbolic gateway to Western China, Inner Asia, West Asia, and Anatolia. He also now had to monitor judicial systems and disaster management in Ganzhou, through reviewing legal cases and collecting taxes from the civilians. Due to Gansu's proneness to drought, Buyantai also initiated a water conservation campaign.

=== Afaqi Khoja Revolts ===
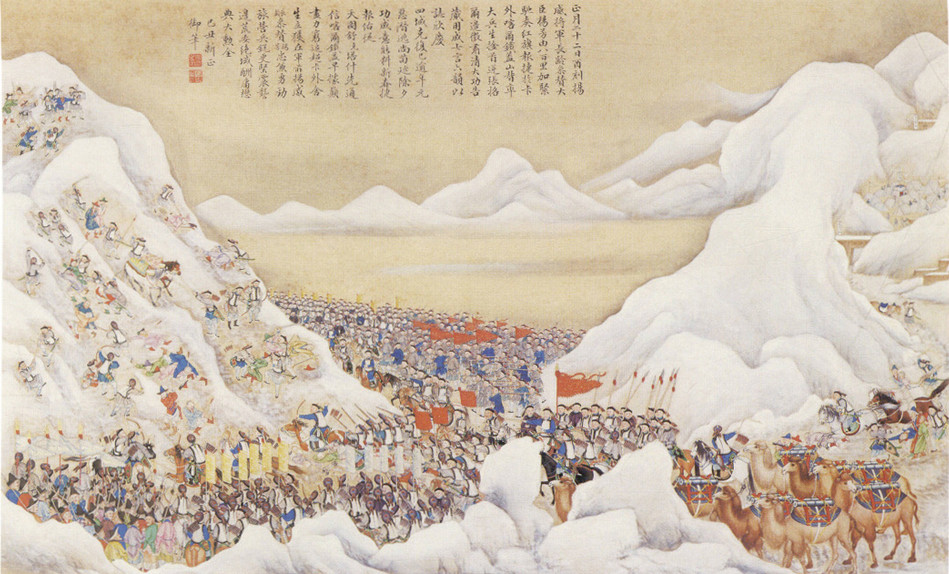
Qing victory over the Āfāqīs in Kashgar, 1828

In 1826, a man of the Afaqi Khoja clan, Jahangir Khoja, escaped from the Khanate of Kokand to Kashgar in the Qing Dynasty, after his Afaqi Khoja Clan was previously banned from the dynasty in 1750. Among Jahangir's troops and followers were Kyrgyz, Tajiks and White Mountain fighters. After appearing in Kashgar with only several hundred of his followers, he quickly increased his force with volunteers and within several months had collected about 200,000 troops under his command. Jahangir Khoja then overthrew Qing power in Kashgar, Yarkand, Khotan, Kargalik, Yangi Hissar and Maralbashi, having annihilated the Qing garrisons in these 6 cities of West Kashgaria. His forces captured several hundred Chinese Muslims (Dungan or Hui), who were taken to Kokand. Tajiks brought two Chinese slaves from Shaanxi whom they enslaved for a year before Tajik Beg Ku-bu-te returned them to China. All Chinese captured—including merchants and 300 soldiers Janhangir captured in Kashgar—had their queues cut off when brought to Kokand and Central Asia as prisoners.

In the early 1820s, after the new Daoguang Emperor inherited the Qing Throne from the Jiaqing Emperor following the latter's death in 1820, Buyantai was appointed as a military commander in Yarkand and Kashgar in Xinjiang, with sources suggesting he was either a Deputy Commander or Supply Commissioner for the Southern Route Armies. In 1826, when Jahangir first escaped into Kashgar and initiated the Afaqi Khoja revolts, Buyantai, alongside numerous other officials, were tasked with dealing with Jahangir and his followers. He likely held a post such as "Yingwu Dachen" (營務大臣) or "Liangtai Dachen" (糧臺大臣), responsible for troop logistics, supply train security, and coordination between the Qing forces and local allies.

Buyantai began leading infantry into battle when the Qing Imperial Court issued an expeditionary force of around 20,000 Green Standard Army soldiers from Ili, Gansu, and Shaanxi to battle Jahangir and his troops. The campaign that Buyantai participated in was led by General Changling. During the campaigns, Buyantai played a pivotal operational and logistical role, and assisted the army moving from Ürümqi and Ili to Kashgar from the north, as Deputy Logistics Commissioner (糧臺副大臣). During the campaign, his main responsibilities included supplying the Qing frontlines in Kashgar with grains, ammunition, and silver from Hami and Turpan, two prefecture-level cities in Xinjiang. This responsibility was difficult as the resources had to be delivered over the Tianshan mountains, which was done through organizing Bullock carts, hiring local guides, and guarding passes against Khoja or Kyrgyz raiders. In 1827, Jahangir's forces fell during the Battle of Yangi Hissar, and in 1828, Jahangir was captured, brought to Beijing, and killed by Lingchi.

== Appointments in Ili ==
=== Imperial Resident of Ili ===
In late 1830, Buyantai was appointed as the Imperial Resident of Ili by the Daoguang Emperor, which was cited as the most powerful position in Ili outside of the General of Ili himself. In the position, Buyantai inherited many responsibilities, such as military coordination, which involved command over the Ili garrison including Mongol, Manchu, and Green Standard Army infantry. Buyantai effectively commanded this garrison, often using it to guard and defend the Qing-Kazakh Border to prevent a repetition of the Afaqi Khoja Revolts. Buyantai also managed diplomatic relations with Kazakh sultans and Kyrgyz chiefs, including receiving envoys, regulating trade at border markets (huishi), and settling cross-border disputes. Buyantai also managed and supervised tuntians in Ili, which were a type of military-agricultural colony prominent in China, government workshops, and horse pastures in the province that were owned by the Qing government. This was necessary, as Ili was a landlocked area of the Qing Dynasty and therefore had no water to supply itself with. Construction of the Tuntian ensured that Ili was self-sufficient. He also often supported the General in court to represent the Qing jurisdiction in Ili, usually serving as the chief judge for major legal cases involving different ethnic groups within the Ili jurisdiction.

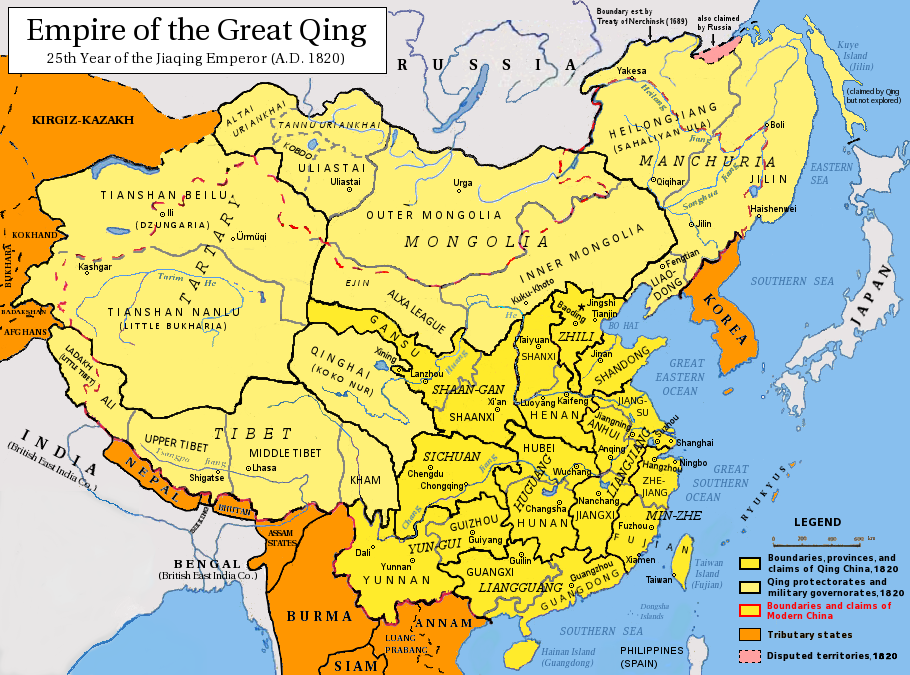
The Qing Dynasty in 1820. The Inner Asian regions are shown in orange

Despite internal success however, Ili was affected heavily internationally by Russian expansion into Central Asia. By the 1830s, The Middle Horde of the Kazakh Khanate and the Great Horde had been neutralised and controlled (although not annexed) by the Russians through the use of treaties and military bases, also known as oblasts. Qing influence in Central Asia began to wane due to the Russian expansion, and countries that formerly paid dual tribute to both the Qing and the Russians began increasingly aligning with the policies of Sankt Petersburg (modern-day Saint Petersburg) Furthermore, the Russians also advanced southwards of Semipalatinsk and Omsk, two Russian military bases, to only a few hundred kilometers away from the Ili River located in Ili. This region was called the Semirechye region and named the Semirechye Oblast by the Russians, where they also built two military bases in 1831 and 1838 which posed as an imminent threat to the Qing. With Russian expansion into Central Asia, Russian goods also began appearing in Central Asian markets, which disrupted the Qing Tributary System.

In response, Buyantai ordered frequent patrols on the Qing-Russian Border to ensure the Russians were not planning an invasion. He also gathered intel and collected reports from loyal Kazakh sultans and Kyrgyz begs on Russian troop movements, fort constructions, and attempts to influence nomadic tribes. This intelligence was crucial for his memorials to the Daoguang Emperor. As many Central Asian nations, included the controlled portions of the Kazakh Khanate were being heavily influenced by Russia, Buyantai maintained the loyalty of Kazakh sultans of the Kaushik lineage by giving them hereditary titles and access to Qing trade at markets on Tarbagatai Mountains. Additionally, he used pressure and better trade deals with Central Asians to convince them to trade with the Qing Dynasty instead of the Russians. It was also at this time where he developed a habit he would always do as a general, he aggressively expanded tuntian colonies. His two reasons for doing so was to maintain food security and increase Han populations in Ili to create a more stable human barrier between the Qing and the Russians.
