= Hongchun =

- Prince Tai of the Second Rank 多羅泰郡王

Prince Tai of the Second Rank
- Reign: 1723–1724; 1726–1735
- Born: 11 October 1703
- Died: 3 March 1739 (aged 35)
- House: Aisin Gioro
- Father: Yunti
- Mother: Lady Šušu Gioro

Hongchun (弘春; 11 October 1703 – 3 March 1739) was a Qing dynasty imperial prince; the eldest son of Yunti, the Kangxi Emperor's 14th son by Empress Xiaogongren, and Qianlong Emperor's cousin. Hongchun was granted a title of Prince Tai of the Second Rank in 1731 and held it until 1735, when he was stripped of his privileges together with future descendants. Unlike other imperial princes whose lineages became extinct, Hongchun's lineage survived till the end of the Qing dynasty. As Prince Tai of the Second Rank peerage was not granted perpetual inheritability, each successive bearer would hold diminished ranks vis-a-vis his predecessor.

== Life of Hongchun ==
Hongchun was born on 11 October 1703 to lady Šušu Gioro, Yunti's secondary consort. In his childhood, Hongchun was described as a filial and intelligent child, which resulted in a close relationship with father.

In 1723, Hongchun was granted a title of the prince of the fourth rank, but was later stripped of his title after it was discovered that Yunti had been a member of "The Party of Eighth Lord" (八爷党) which unsuccessfully supported Yunsi's ascension to the imperial throne. As a result, Yunsi was banished from the imperial clan and renamed "Akina" (阿其那, meaning "frozen fish"). Yunti was placed under the house arrest in the Hall of Imperial Longevity (寿皇殿) in the Jingshan Park in 1726. Hongchun took care of his father during the confinement, which aided his career by bestowal of the title of grace defender duke on him.

In 1728, Hongchun was promoted to the prince of the third rank. In 1731, he was granted the title Prince Tai of the Second Rank (泰郡王, meaning "peaceful"). Prior to ascension of the Qianlong Emperor, Hongchun was blamed for misusing the annual stipend, especially embezzlement of 1000 taels. Moreover, Yongzheng Emperor accused him of blasphemy against Buddha. Hongchun was stripped of his title and his property was arrested by Embroidered Uniform Guards, Qing dynasty secret police known as "luanyiwei" (銮仪卫) at that time. Hongchun died on 3 March 1739 and did not receive posthumous honours.

His descendants became minor clansmen (闲散宗室, pinyin: xiansan zongshi), hence being recorded in imperial genealogy.

=== Family of Hongchun ===
Hongchun was married to lady Guwalgiya, daughter of viscount Qingde (庆德). His secondary consort, lady Usun, was demoted to mistress shortly after he was stripped of his princely title.

Consorts and issue:

- Primary consort, of the Gūwalgiya clan (嫡妻 瓜尔佳氏)
  贝子夫人-->奉恩镇国公夫人-->贝子夫人-->贝勒夫人-->泰郡王嫡福晋-->宗室妻
  - Yongxin (永信, 1720–1806), first son
  - Chang'anbao (常安保, 1721–1727), second son
  - Yongyu (永豫, 1723–1781), third son
  - Yongshuo (永朔, 1724–1773), fifth son
- Mistress, of the Usun clan (妾 乌苏氏)
  贝子侧夫人-->奉恩镇国公侧夫人-->贝子侧夫人-->贝勒侧夫人-->泰郡王侧福晋-->泰郡王庶福晋-->宗室妾
  - Yongta (永塔; 1735–1749), seventh son
- Mistress, of the Wang clan (妾 王氏)
  - Leader of imperial guards Yongjin (头等侍卫永晋;1729–1775), sixth son
- Mistress, of the Cui clan (妾崔氏)
  - Changqingbao (常庆保；1723–1729), fourth son

== Members of Prince Tai of the Second Rank peerage ==
- Hongchun (1703–1739)
  - Yongxin (永信, 1720–1806), first son
    - Mianshun (绵顺,1743–1748), Yongxin's son who died prematurely
      - Yizhang (奕彰,1768–1836), Miandai's second son by lady Feimo adopted as a posthumous successor of Mianshun
        - Zaifen (载芬 1821–1867), Yizhang's son
          - Puyong (溥雍, 1843–1883), Zaifen's son
            - Yuduan (毓鍴, 1887-?), Puyong's adoptive son and Pugang's biological son
              - Hengji (恒纪, 1907-?), Yuduan's son
  - Yongjin (永晋), Hongchun's sixth son
    - Miandai (绵代), Yongjin's eldest son
      - Yihou (奕厚,1773–1856), Miandai's first son
      - Yizhang, adopted as Mianshun's son
      - Yiduan (奕短), died prematurely
    - Mianbing (绵炳,1764-1790), Yongjin's son
      - Yiju (奕炬,1788-1845), Mianbing's son
        - Zaidou (载豆,1831-1891), Yiju's son
          - Pugang (溥岗,1855-?), Zaidou's son
            - Yuduan, adopted by Puyong
    - Mianbei (绵備), Yongjin's son
      - Yishan (1790–1878), Mianbei's eldest son, held the title of a first class zhenguo jiangjun from 1847 to 1878
        - Zaizhuo (载鷟), Yishan's second son, held the title of a third class fuguo jiangjun from 1851 to 1876
          - Puhan (溥翰), Zaizhuo's eldest son, held the title of a third class fengguo jiangjun from 1857 to 1878, held the title of a third class fuguo jiangjun from 1878 to 1886
            - Yuzhao (毓照), Puhan's third son, held the title of a third class fuguo jiangjun from 1887
