= Prince Tai =

Prince Tai of the Second Rank (泰郡王) was Qing dynasty princely peerage created in 1733 for Kangxi Emperor's grandson and Prince Xunqin of the Second Rank Yunti's son Hongchun.As Prince Tai of the Second Rank peerage was not granted perpetual inheritability, each successive bearer would hold diminished ranks vis-a-vis his predecessor.

== Holders of the peerage ==
- 1723–1724, 1726—1735：Prince Tai of the Second Rank Hongchun. He was granted a title of Prince of the Fourth Rank and stripped of his title in 1724. Restored as grace defender duke in 1726, promoted in 1728 to Prince of the Fourth Rank, promoted in 1731 to Prince of the Third Rank. In 1733 he was granted a title of Prince Tai of the Second Rank, peaceful"). then demoted to Prince of the Fourth Rank in 1734 and deprived of his titles in 1735.

=== Later members of the peerage ===
- Hongchun (1703–1739)
  - Yongxin (永信, 1720–1806), first son
    - Mianshun (绵顺,1743–1748), Yongxin's son who died prematurely
      - Yizhang (奕彰,1768–1836), Miandai's second son by lady Feimo adopted as a posthumous successor of Mianshun
        - Zaifen (载芬 1821–1867), Yizhang's son
          - Puyong (溥雍, 1843–1883), Zaifen's son
            - Yuduan (毓鍴, 1887-?), Puyong's adoptive son and Pugang's biological son
              - Hengji (恒纪, 1907-?), Yuduan's son
  - Yongjin (永晋), Hongchun's sixth son
    - Miandai (绵代), Yongjin's eldest son
      - Yihou (奕厚,1773–1856), Miandai's first son
      - Yizhang, adopted as Mianshun's son
      - Yiduan (奕短), died prematurely
    - Mianbing (绵炳,1764-1790), Yongjin's son
      - Yiju (奕炬,1788-1845), Mianbing's son
        - Zaidou (载豆,1831-1891), Yiju's son
          - Pugang (溥岗,1855-?), Zaidou's son
            - Yuduan, adopted by Puyong
    - Mianbei (绵備), Yongjin's son
      - Yishan (1790–1878), Mianbei's eldest son, held the title of a first class zhenguo jiangjun from 1847 to 1878
        - Zaizhuo (载鷟), Yishan's second son, held the title of a third class fuguo jiangjun from 1851 to 1876
          - Puhan (溥翰), Zaizhuo's eldest son, held the title of a third class fengguo jiangjun from 1857 to 1878, held the title of a third class fuguo jiangjun from 1878 to 1886
            - Yuzhao (毓照), Puhan's third son, held the title of a third class fuguo jiangjun from 1887
