= Treaty of Kulja =

1851 treaty between Russia and China

Sino-Russian Trade Regulations for Ili and Tarbagatai
- Drafted: 25 July 1851
- Signed: 25 July 1851
- Location: Yining
- Effective: 25 July 1851
- Condition: Ratification by the Qing Dynasty and the Russian Empire
- Signatories: Yishan; Buyantai; Yegor Kovalevsky; Ivan Zakharov
- Parties: (Qing dynasty) China; (Russian Empire) Russia

The Treaty of Kulja (also spelled Kuldja; Chinese: 中俄伊犁塔爾巴哈臺通商章程; Russian: Кульджинский трактат) was a treaty between Qing China and the Russian Empire, signed in 1851, opening Kulja (Huiyuan and later Ningyuan) and Chuguchak to Sino-Russian trade. Prepared by the first Russian consul to China, Ivan Zakharov, the treaty was preceded by gradual Russian advance throughout the nineteenth century into Kazakhstan in direct competition with British efforts to impose self-advantageous trade terms on China.

== Historical context ==
Cross-border trade became increasingly important to Russia and China in the 19th century with Russian merchants trading illegally at Kulja in Xinjiang's Yili River Valley. In 1803, Tsar Alexander I attempted to negotiate the opening of the entire Sino-Russian border to trade. This effort failed, however, when the Tsar's representative refused to kow-tow to a tablet representing the Emperor.

Preceded by a gradual Russian advance throughout the 19th century into Kazakhstan, in direct competition with British efforts to impose self-advantageous trade terms on China, the treaty was signed on 25 July 1851 by the Yishan and Buyantai. Under its terms Kulja (Huiyuan and later Ningyuan) and Chuguchak (modern Tacheng) were opened to Russian trade. However the Qing court denied the Russian request to include trading in Kashgar.

The treaty also allowed Russian merchants to trade and Russian consuls to reside in the Xinjiang towns of Yili (Huiyuan before 1863 and Ningyuan after 1882) and Tarbagatai. Russian trade with Xinjiang flourished and Alma Ata was founded in 1854 to become an important link in this trade.

While the treaty primarily legalized ongoing practice, it also recognized the growing Russian presence in Central Asia. China's defenses on this border had been greatly neglected since the start of the 19th century.

The official text of the treaty was written in Russian, French and Manchu; the original treaty did not have an official Chinese version.

== See also ==
- Treaty of Tarbagatai (1864) which defined the new border
- Treaty of Saint Petersburg (1881) which returned the temporarily occupied Kulja country
- Economic history of China
- Unequal treaties
- Imperialism in Asia
