= Yegor Kovalevsky =

Russian traveller, writer, and diplomat

Egor or Yegor Petrovich Kovalevsky
- Его́р Петро́вич Ковале́вский
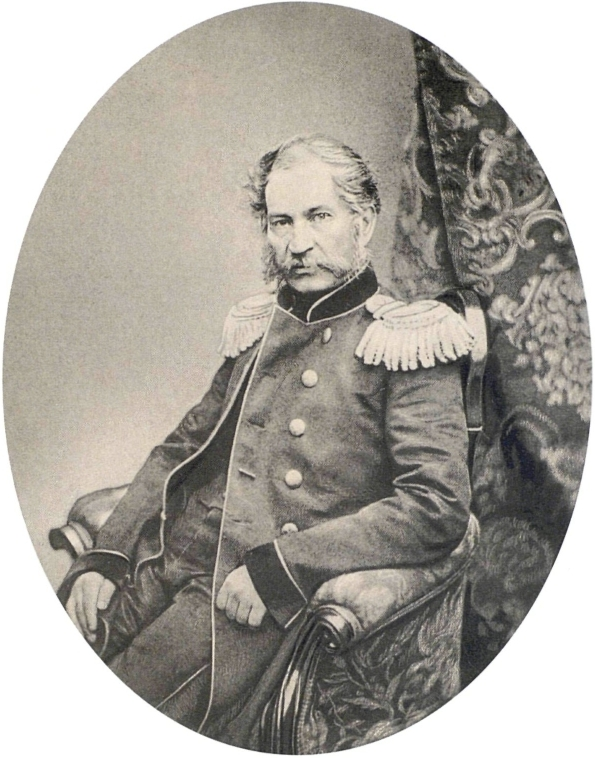
- Yegor Kovalevsky by Sergey Lvovich Levitsky (1856)
- Born: 18 February 1809; Yaroshovka, Kharkov Governorate, Russian Empire
- Died: 2 October 1868 (aged 59); Saint Petersburg, Russian Empire
- Occupations: Traveller, writer, diplomat

Egor or Yegor Petrovich Kovalevsky (Russian: Его́р Петро́вич Ковале́вский; 18 February 1809 or 1811, in Kharkov Governorate – 2 October 1868, in Saint Petersburg) was a Russian traveller, writer, and diplomat.

== Biography ==
He was born to Pyotr Ivanovich Kovalevsky, a noble Court Councilor. From 1825 to 1828, he studied in the philosophy department at Kharkov University. After graduating, he entered the service of the Mining Department where, following the example of his older brother, Yevgraf, he developed an interest in geology. In 1830 he qualified as a Mining Engineer and went to work in Siberia. By 1837 he had opened four gold mines there.

That year, at the request of Prince-Bishop Petar II, he was sent to Montenegro to search for gold. While there, he was forced to take part in several border skirmishes with the Austrian Empire. Realizing that he could be punished for doing so when he returned to Russia, he consulted with Prince Alexander Gorchakov, and sent a detailed explanatory note to Tsar Nicholas I. After reading it, the Tsar made a notation (in French), «Le capitaine Kowalewsky a agi en vrai russe». (He acted like a true Russian). Later, Kovalevsky would write Four Months in Montenegro.

He received another invitation to hunt for gold, in 1847, from Pasha Muhammad Ali of Egypt. In addition to all the usual preparations for such a trip, he was instructed by the Russian Envoy in Istanbul, Vladimir Titov, to collect information regarding the Pasha's plans for public works (including a canal near Suez), and his involvement in the slave trade. He was in Egypt and what is now Sudan through 1848 and, among his practical accomplishments, he was able to chart the source of the White Nile, as well as discover a small deposit of gold south of Wad Madani, near the Blue Nile. This, and a description of Abyssinia, was included in his book A Journey to Inner Africa, in which he also spoke in favor of a canal, to encourage trade with India, and condemned slavery.

In 1849 he joined the thirteenth Russian Spiritual Mission to Beijing; contributing to the knowledge of better merchant routes through Mongolia. He also helped to mediate the Treaty of Kulja (1851), which formalized the existing trade arrangements between Russia and Western China (Xinjiang), and helped expand Russian influence in what is now Kazakhstan. Upon returning, he wrote A Journey to China.

From 1853 to 1855 he took part in the Crimean War; initially being sent to Montenegro as a Commissar, following the attack by Omar Pasha. Later, he was present at the Siege of Sevastopol; staying at the headquarters of General Mikhail Gorchakov and collecting materials related to the siege. These would later be part of his historical commentary, War with Turkey and the Break with the Western Powers. Following the war, in 1856, Prince Alexander Gorchakov appointed him as manager of the Asian Department at the Ministry of Foreign Affairs; a position he held until 1861. That year, he became a Senator and a member of the Council at the Ministry.

In 1859 he was one of the founding members of the Literary Fund, a society devoted to the financial support of struggling writers, and served as its chairman until his death in 1868. He wrote over 100 works altogether. Following his death, the poet Fyodor Tyutchev wrote a lengthy memorial poem in his honor.

== Works online ==
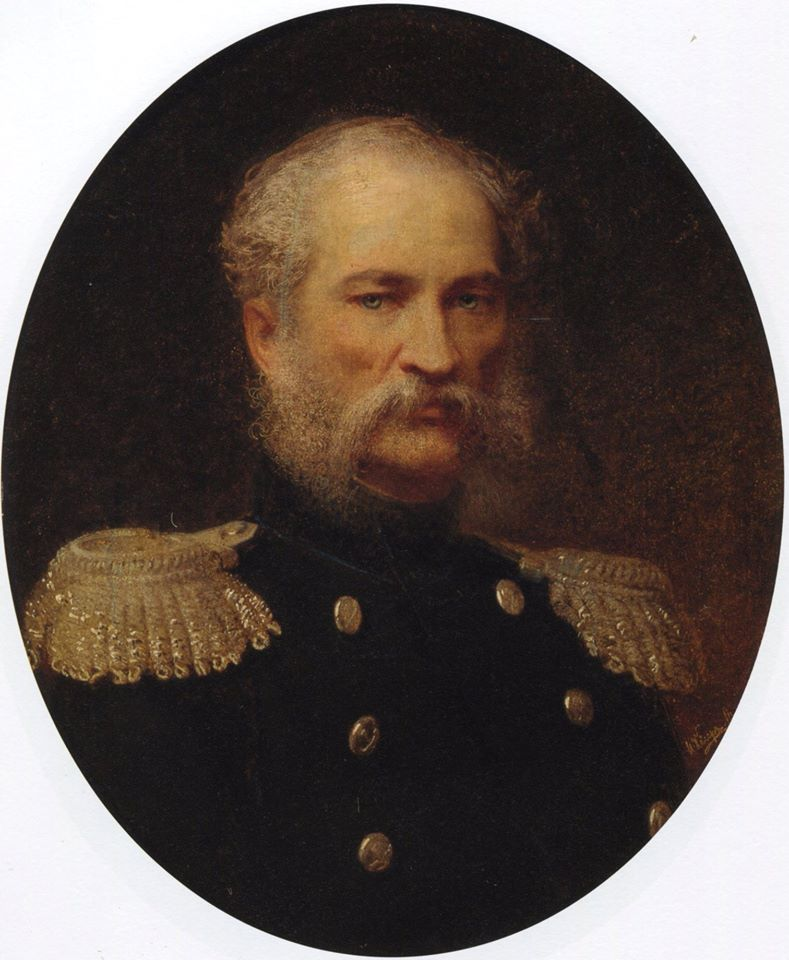
Portrait by Johann Köler (1868)

- Путешествие во внутреннюю Африку (A Journey to Inner Africa), Eduard Prap Publishing, 1849
- Путешествие в Китай — Ч. 2 (A Journey to China, Part II), Koroleva & Co., 1853
- Граф Блудов и его время. Царствование императора Александра I (Count Bludov and his Time. The Reign of Emperor Alexander I), SPB, 1866
