= Ivan Zakharov =

Russian diplomat

Ivan Zakharov in 1872

Ivan Ilyich Zakharov (Russian: Иван Ильич Захаров; 1816–1885) was a Russian diplomat who worked in the Peking Orthodox Mission between 1839 and 1850. As the first Russian consul in China he prepared the Treaty of Kulja (1851) and helped delineate the Russo-Chinese borders in 1864.

Zakharov ended his career as Professor of Manchu Philology at the Saint Petersburg Imperial University. Most of his works have never been published. His Russian-Manchu wordbook of 1875 became one of the first Manchu dictionaries available in Europe at the time of its publication.

Zakharov's outline of Manchu grammar appeared in 1879 and was reprinted 100 years later by Global Oriental as "an important book that is so rare as to be virtually unobtainable".

== Works ==
- Захаров, Иван Ильич (1875). Полный Маньчжурско-Русскій Словарь [Comprehensive Manchu-Russian Dictionary] (PDF). Санктпетербургъ: Типографія Императорской Академіи Наукъ.
- Захаров, Иван Ильич (1879). Грамматика Маньчжурскаго Языка [Grammar of the Manchu Language]. Санктпетербургъ: Типографія Императорской Академіи Наукъ.
