= G3016 Qingshuihe–Yining Expressway =

Road in Xinjiang, China

Qingshuihe–Yining Expressway
- يۇقىرى سۈرئەتلىك تاشيولى چىڭسىخوزا-غۇلجا
- Qingyi Expressway 清伊高速公路
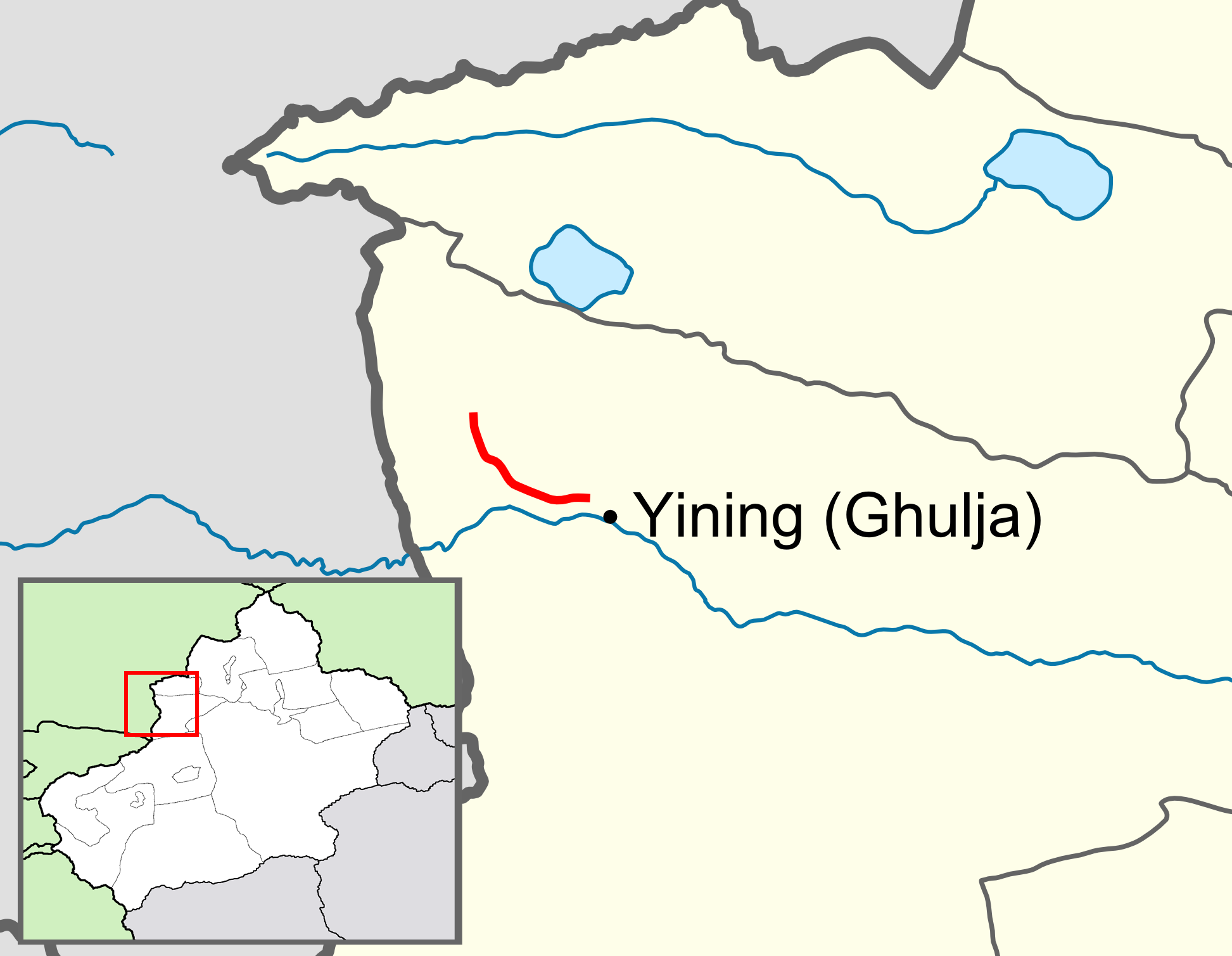
- Route of the G3016 Qingshuihe–Yining Expressway in Xinjiang.

Route information
- Auxiliary route of G30
- Length: 56.36 km (35.02 mi)
- Existed: 20 April 2009–present

Major junctions
- West end: G30 in Qingshuihe, Huocheng County, Ili Kazakh Autonomous Prefecture, Xinjiang
- East end: G218 in Bayandai, Yining, Ili Kazakh Autonomous Prefecture, Xinjiang

Location
- Country: China

Highway system
- National Trunk Highway System; Primary; Auxiliary; National Highways; Transport in China
| ← G3015 | → G3017 |

Qingshuihe–Yining Expressway

Chinese name
- Simplified Chinese: 清水河—伊宁高速公路
- Traditional Chinese: 清水河—伊寧高速公路
Transcriptions
Standard Mandarin
- Hanyu Pinyin: Qīngshuǐhé—Yīníng Gāosù Gōnglù
- Wade–Giles: Ch'ing^{1}-shui^{3}-ho^{2}–I^{1}-ning^{2} Kao^{1}-su^{4} Kung^{1}-lu^{4}
Yue: Cantonese
- Jyutping: Ceng^{1}seoi^{2}ho^{4}–ji^{1}ning^{4} gou^{1}cuk^{1} gung^{1}lou^{6}

Commonly abbreviated as
- Simplified Chinese: 清伊高速公路
- Traditional Chinese: 清伊高速公路
Transcriptions
Standard Mandarin
- Hanyu Pinyin: Qīngyī Gāosù Gōnglù
Yue: Cantonese
- Jyutping: Ceng^{1}ji^{1} gou^{1}cuk^{1} gung^{1}lou^{6}

Uyghur name
- Uyghur: چىڭسىخوزا-غۇلجا يۇقىرى سۈرئەتلىك تاشيولى
Transcriptions
- Latin Yëziqi: Chingsixoza–Ghulja süretlik yoli
- Yengi Yeziⱪ: Qingsihoza–Ƣulja sürətlik yoli
- Siril Yëziqi: Чиңсиһоза–ғулҗа сүрәтлик йоли

The G3016 Qingshuihe–Yining Expressway (Chinese: 清水河—伊宁高速公路, Uyghur: چىڭسىخوزا-غۇلجا يۇقىرى سۈرئەتلىك تاشيولى), commonly referred to as the Qingyi Expressway (Chinese: 清伊高速公路), is a 56.36-kilometre-long-Chinese expressway (35.02 mi) in the Ili Kazakh Autonomous Prefecture of Xinjiang, China. It connects the towns of Qingshuihe, in Huocheng County, and Bayandai, in Yining City (also known as Ghulja). It opened on 20 April 2009.

The expressway is an auxiliary line of the G30 Lianyungang–Khorgas Expressway. It branches from the G30 Lianyungang–Khorgas Expressway at Qingshuihe.

China Expwy G3016 sign with name ug

China Expwy G3016 sign no name

China Expwy G3016 sign with name

== Route ==
The expressway begins at an interchange with the G30 Lianyungang–Khorgas Expressway east of the town of Qingshuihe, in Huocheng County. It proceeds southward, crossing China National Highway 312 and paralleling much of China National Highway 218, which also connects Qingshuihe with Yining. The expressway runs beside China National Highway 218, before deviating eastward as it approaches Shuiding, the county seat of Huocheng County. It passes through the Huocheng Tunnel and then curves southward, joining China National Highway 218 again at the town of Huiyuan. The expressway returns to an easterly direction, paralleling China National Highway 218 for the rest of the route until its eastern terminus in Bayandai, in Yining City.

An extension of the expressway further eastward to the town of Dunmazha, in Yining County, called the Yining–Dunmazha Expressway, opened on December 16, 2013. It begins just before the eastern terminus of the Qingshuihe–Yining Expressway. This extension is not designated as part of G30_{15}, but instead carries the new expressway alignment of China National Highway 218.

== Exit list ==
| Location | km | mi | Exit | Name | Destinations | Notes |
G3016 (Qingshuihe–Yining Expressway)
| Huocheng County (Korgas), Ili Kazakh, Xinjiang | | | 0 | Qingshui Interchange | G30 – Jinghe County | |
| Huocheng County (Korgas), Ili Kazakh, Xinjiang | | | 1 | G312 – Lucaogou, Qingshuihe | | Northbound exit and southbound entrance only |
| Huocheng County (Korgas), Ili Kazakh, Xinjiang | | | 16 | G218 – Huocheng | | Southbound exit and northbound entrance only |
| Huocheng County (Korgas), Ili Kazakh, Xinjiang | | | 19 | Huocheng Interchange | X723 – Huocheng, Sarbulaq (Sa'erbulake) | Northbound exit and southbound entrance only |
| Huocheng County (Korgas), Ili Kazakh, Xinjiang | | | 28A | Huiyuan Interchange | G218 – Huiyuan, XPCC 66th Regiment | |
| Huocheng County (Korgas), Ili Kazakh, Xinjiang | Huiyuan East Toll Booth | | | | | |
| Yining (Ghulja), Ili Kazakh, Xinjiang | | | 42 | 66th Regiment Interchange | G218 – XPCC 66th Regiment | Westbound exit and eastbound entrance only |
| Yining (Ghulja), Ili Kazakh, Xinjiang | | | | G218 Yining–Dunmazha Expressway – Dunmazha | | |
| Yining (Ghulja), Ili Kazakh, Xinjiang | | | | Bayandai Interchange | G218 – Yining | Exit to eastbound G218 only; entrance from westbound G218 only |
Closed/former; Concurrency terminus; HOV only; Incomplete access; Tolled; Route transition; Unopened
