= Yining–Dunmazha Expressway =

Road in Xinjiang, China

Yining–Dunmazha Expressway 伊宁–墩麻扎高速公路
- 218国道
- Yidun Expressway 伊墩高速公路

Route information
- Length: 67.4 km (41.9 mi)
- Existed: December 16, 2013–present

Major junctions
- West end: G3016 in Bayandai, Yining City, Ili Kazakh Autonomous Prefecture, Xinjiang
- East end: G218 in Dunmazha, Yining County, Ili Kazakh Autonomous Prefecture, Xinjiang

Location
- Country: China

Highway system
- National Trunk Highway System; Primary; Auxiliary

The Yining–Dunmazha Expressway (Chinese: 伊宁–墩麻扎高速公路), commonly referred to as the S12 Yidun Expressway (Chinese: 伊墩高速公路) is an expressway that connects the town of Bayandai in Yining City with Dunmazha in Yining County. The route is entirely in the Ili Kazakh Autonomous Prefecture in the Chinese autonomous region of Xinjiang. The expressway is a part of China National Highway 218. It opened on December 16, 2013, replacing an old alignment of the highway. At its western end in Bayandai, it connects to the G3016 Qingshuihe–Yining Expressway.

Tolls began to be collected on the entire route of the expressway on June 15, 2015.
