= Yining (disambiguation) =

Yining (historically Ghulja or Kulja) is a city in Xinjiang, China.

Yining may also refer to:

- Yining County, historically known as Jëlilyüzi
- Yining, Jiangxi, a town in Xiushui County
- Yishan Yining (1247–1317), Chinese Zen master
- Li Yining (1930–2023), Chinese economist
