= Ningyuan =

Ningyuan (Chinese: 宁远) may refer to the following locations in China:

== City ==
Xingcheng, former name Ningyuan (宁远), a county-level city, Liaoning, China

== County ==
- Ningyuan County (宁远县), in Yongzhou, Hunan

== Subdistrict (街道)/Town (镇) ==
- Ningyuan Subdistrict, Xingcheng, in Xingcheng, Huludao, Liaoning
- Ningyuan Subdistrict, Tiexi District, in Tiexi District, Anshan, Liaoning
- Ningyuan Town, Anding District, in Anding District, Dingxi, Gansu
- Ningyuan Town, Bin County, in Bin County, Harbin, Heilongjiang
- Ningyuanbao Town, in Jinchuan District, Jinchang, Gansu

== Historic ==
- Ningyuan, Sichuan
- Xingcheng, Huludao, Liaoning, formerly Ningyuan (宁远)
  - Battle of Ningyuan (宁远之战), 1626
- Yining City and Yining County, Xinjiang, formerly Ningyuan (寧遠)

== Other places ==
- Ningyuan Railway Station, in Ningyuanbao Village, Qiaodong District, Zhangjiakou, Hebei
- Diocese of Ningyuan
- Zhangjiakou Ningyuan Airport
