= General of Ili =

Chinese military governor

- Chinese: 伊犁將軍
- Government Flag

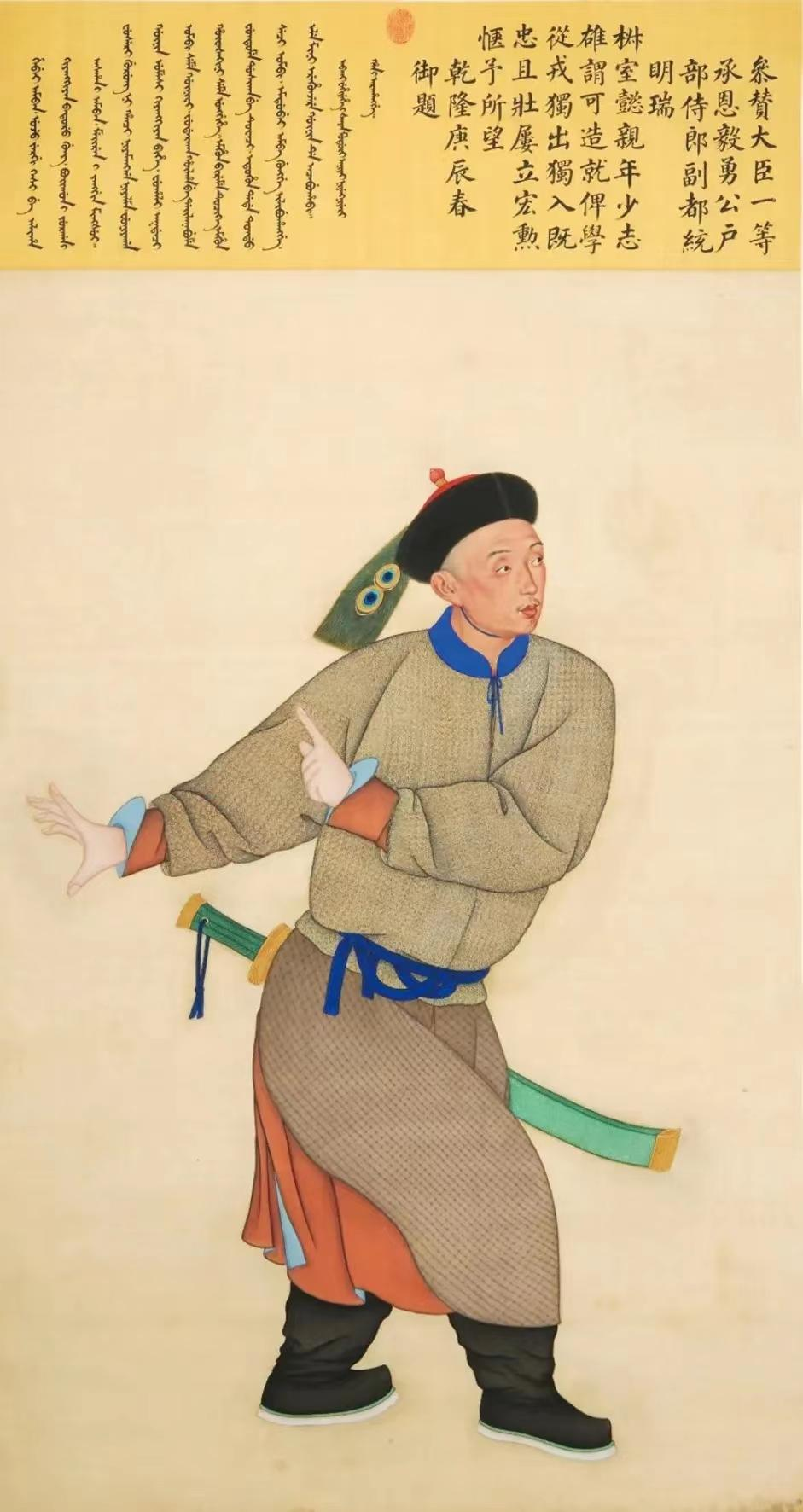
- Mingrui, a respected general and the nephew of Qianlong Emperor, served as the first General of Ili
- Style: Governor
- Status: Head of state; Head of government
- Residence: Office of General of Ili (in present-day Huocheng, Xinjiang)
- Term length: undefinitive
- Formation: 1762-1911
- First holder: Mingrui
- Final holder: Elehun

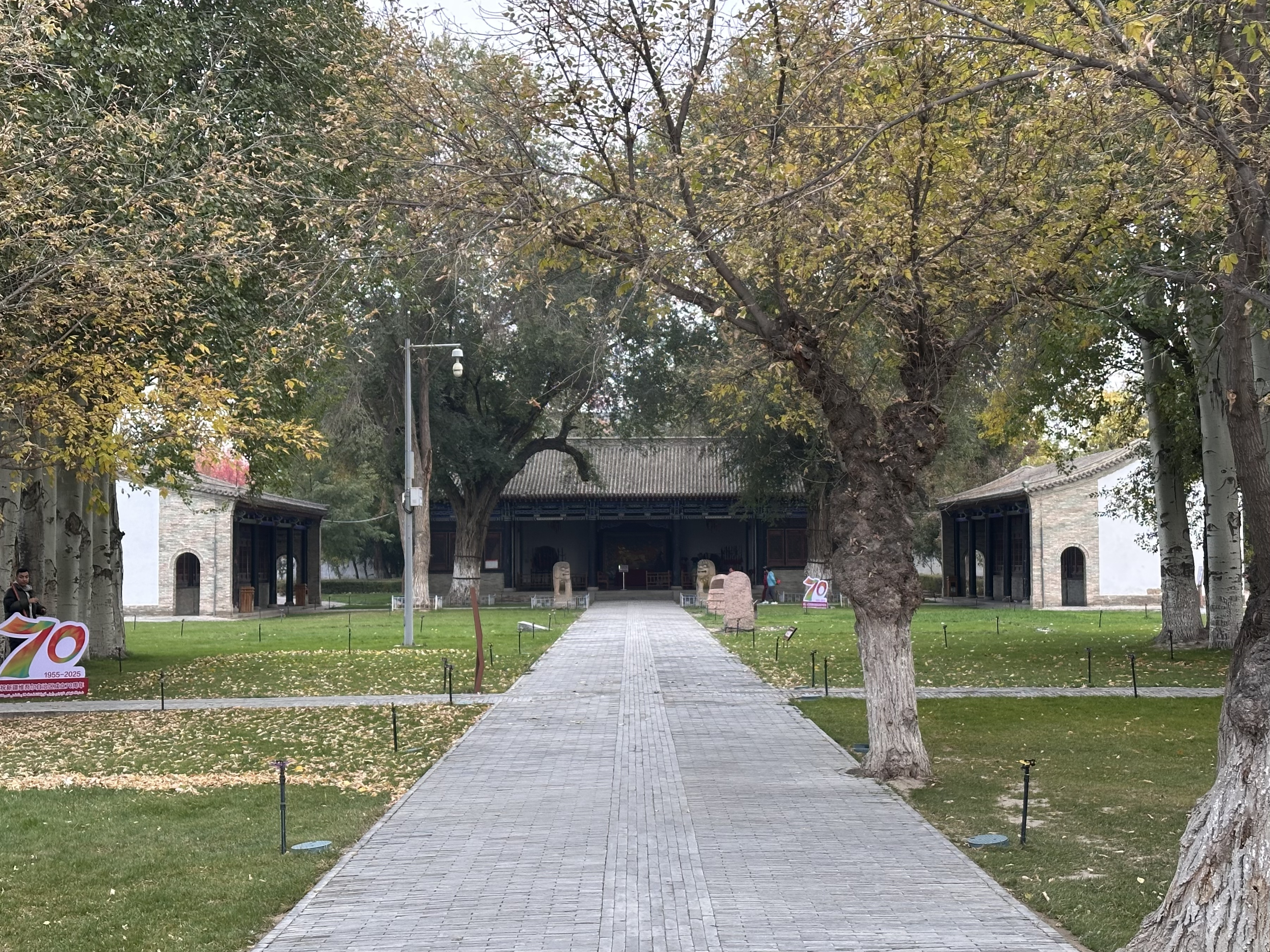
Former Mansion of General of Ili in Huocheng, Xinjiang

The General of Ili (Chinese: 伊犁將軍; pinyin: Yīlí Jiāngjūn Officially 總統伊犁等處將軍), also known as the Viceroy of Ili, and in western sources as the Kulja Military Governor, was a position created during the reign of the Qing Qianlong Emperor (r. 1735-1799) to "pacify" Dzungaria (now part of Xinjiang) and suppress uprisings by the Khoja "Rebels". The General of Ili governed the entirety of Xinjiang during Qing rule until it was turned into a province.

== History ==
Based in Huiyuan City (惠远城; 惠遠城; now Huiyuan Town, Huocheng County), in the Qing delineated greater Xinjiang region in the northwest of China, the general was the senior military commander in the area. In 1759, Qing general Zhao Hui (Manchu: Zhaohuui) suppressed the Revolt of the Altishahr Khojas and reestablished Qing control over the western part of Xinjiang. As a result, in 1762 the Qing court established the position of General of Ili with Ming Rui as the first incumbent.

At the same time, the offices of Military Attache or Dūtǒng (都統) and Imperial Resident (駐紮大臣) were created under the general to manage military affairs north and south of the Tian Shan range of mountains. The northern circuit (天山北路) or Tarim Basin was administered by the Ili Ministerial Attache (伊犁參贊大臣), five Ministerial Leaders (領隊大臣), a Tarbagatai Ministerial Attache (塔尔巴哈台参赞大臣; 塔爾巴哈臺參贊大臣) and a Minister of Affairs (辦事兼領隊大臣). In the south (天山南路) or Altishahr there was a General Minister for Altashahr Affairs (總理回疆事務參贊大臣) responsible for Kashgar, Yarkant, Yengisar, Uqturpan, Aksu, Kuqa, Hotan and Karasahr amongst others. In the western circuit (東路 the Urumqi Military Command (烏魯木齊都統) was responsible for Gucheng (Chinese: 古城; now Qitai County), Barköl Kazakh Autonomous County, Hami Agency (哈密廳, now Hami City) and Kur Qara Usu (now Wusu) among other locations.

In 1763, the Qianlong Emperor ordered the construction of the new city of Huiyuan on the north bank of the Ili River as a base and headquarter for the General of Ili. Thereafter, Huiyuan became the capital of the Qing Xinjiang Region. A further eight fortified cities were then constructed across the Ili or Dzungarian Basin: Ningyuan City (寧遠城; now Yining City), Huining City (惠寧城; now Bayandai Township [巴彥岱鎮) 10–18 kilometres (6.2–11.2 mi) west of Yining), Taleqi City (塔勒奇城; now part of Huocheng County), Zhande City (瞻德城; now part of Qingshuihe County), Guangren City (廣仁城; now Lucaogou Town (蘆草溝鎮 in Huocheng County), Gongchen City (拱宸城; now Khorgas City), Xichun City (熙春城; now part of Yining City) and Suiding City (綏定城; now Shuiding Town).

The headquarters of the Manchu bannermen was in Huiyuan and Huining while the Green Standard Army was distributed across the remaining towns with their commander in Suiding. Uyghur merchants (including the Taranchi) resided in Ningyuan. Their affairs were managed by the General of Ili through the East Yamen (东衙门; 東衙門; Dōng Yámén).

In 1864, during the reign of the Tongzhi Emperor, the Xinjiang Hui Rebellion broke out concurrent with the Dungan Revolt of 1862-77 further east. On 8 March 1866, a large force of Hui Muslims captured the General of Ili Mingsioi's Yamen. He committed suicide by blowing himself up but his predecessor Cangcing (Chinese: 常清; pinyin: Cháng Qīng) was captured and paraded through the streets.

After Tzarist Russia invaded the Ili Basin in 1865 they demolished Huiyuan then in 1876 Qing General Zuo Zongtang, at the head of a large army, ended Yaqub Beg's occupation of the southern part of Xinjiang. In 1881 the Qing army recaptured the Ili Basin and two years later rebuilt Huiyaun 7.5 km (4.7 mi) north of its former site. This new settlement was known historically as "New Huiyuan" (新惠遠).

Xinjiang officially became a province in 1883 with its capital at Dihua Fu (迪化府 modern day Urumqi) and Huiyuan gradually lost its political importance; the General was to defend the north of the new province until the position was abolished following the 1911 Xinhai Revolution.

== Officeholders ==
Name	Appointed	End date	Banner
Mingrui	October 1762	March 1767	Bordered Yellow Banner
Agui	March 1767	April 1768	Bordered Blue Banner
Iletu	July 1768	October 1769	Plain White Banner
Yonggui	October 1769	October 1770	Plain White Banner
Zenghai	October 1770	December 1770	Bordered Blue Banner Imperial Clan
Iletu	December 1770	July 1772	Plain White Banner
Šuhede	October 1772	July 1774	Plain White Banner
Iletu	July 1774	June 1784	Plain White Banner
Mingliang	June 1784	July 1784	Plain Yellow Banner
Hailu (海祿	July 1784	August 1784	Plain Blue Banner
Iletu	August 1784	July 1793	Plain White Banner
Kui Lin	July 1793	September 1795	Bordered Yellow Banner
Yongduo (永鐸)	September 1795	November 1795	Bordered Blue Banner
Booning	1795	1798	Plain White Banner
Mingliang	1798	1799	Bordered Yellow Banner
Booning	1799	1801	Plain White Banner
Songyun	1801	1801	Plain Blue Banner
Booning	1801	1803	Plain White Banner
Songyun	1803	1810	Plain Blue Banner
Jinchang	1810	1814	Plain Blue Banner
Songyun	1814	1818	Plain Blue Banner
Changling	1818	1820	Plain White Banner
Gao Qi	1820		Bordered Yellow Banner
Qingxiang	1820	1825	Plain White Banner
Deying'a	1825		Bordered Yellow Banner
Changling	1825	1827	Plain White Banner
Deying'a	1828		Bordered Blue Banner
Yulin	1828	1830	Plain Yellow Banner
Yishan	1830	1839	Bordered Red Banner
Guanfu	1839	1840	Bordered White Banner
Buyantai	1840	1845	Plain Yellow Banner
Yishan	1845	1855	Bordered Red Banner
Zhalafentai	1855	1856	Plain Yellow Banner
Changqing	1856	1857	Bordered Blue Banner
Zhalafentai	1857	1860	Plain Yellow Banner
Changqing	1860	1864	Bordered Blue Banner
Mingxu	1864	1866	Bordered Red Banner
Li Yunlin	1866		
Rongquan	1866	1877	Plain Yellow Banner
Jinshun	1877	1886	Bordered Blue Banner
Xilun	1886	1887	Plain Blue Banner
Selengge	1887	1891	Plain White Banner
Fuleminge	1891		Bordered White Banner
Changgeng	1891	1902	Plain Yellow Banner
Ma Liang	1902	1906	Plain Yellow Banner
Guangfu	1906	1907	Plain Blue Banner
Changgeng	1907	1909	Plain Yellow Banner
Guangfu	1909	1911	Plain Blue Banner
Zhirui	1911		Plain Red Banner
Elehun	1911		

== See also ==
- Xinjiang under Qing rule
- Mongolia under Qing rule

== Notes ==
1. Responsible for the area around modern-day Tacheng
