= Shuiding =

Town in Xinjiang Uyghur Autonomous Region, China

Shuiding: 水定镇 (Chinese); سۈيدۈڭ بازىرى (Uyghur); Suiding
- Town
- Interactive map of Shuiding
- Coordinates: 44°03′00″N 80°52′00″E
- Country: China
- Province: Xinjiang Uyghur Autonomous Region
- Prefecture: Ili Kazakh Autonomous Prefecture
- County: Huocheng County

Population (2000)
  - Total: 29,277
- Dialing code(s): +86 999

Shuiding (Chinese: 水定镇; pinyin: Shuǐdìng Zhèn; Uyghur: سۈيدۈڭ بازىرى), formerly Suiding (or Suiting; Chinese: 绥定; pinyin: Suídìng), is a town in the Ili Kazakh Autonomous Prefecture, Xinjiang Uyghur Autonomous Region, China and the county seat of Huocheng County. It is located some 40 kilometres (25 mi) to the northwest of Yining, the main city of the prefecture, and some 10 kilometres (6.2 mi) north of the Ili River.

As of the 2000 census, Shuiding had a population of 29,277.

== History ==
=== Qing dynasty ===
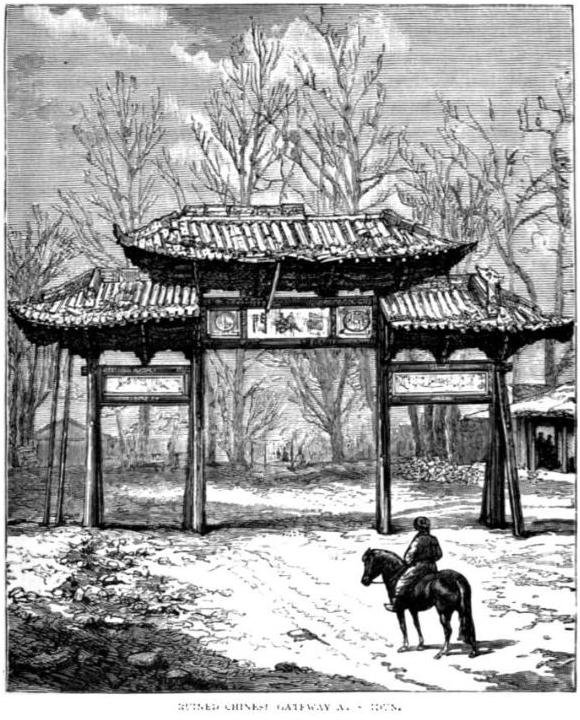
"Ruined Chinese gates in Suidun" (1882)

Suiding (綏定城) was built in 1762 during the reign of the Qianlong Emperor after the Revolt of the Altishahr Khojas was pacified. From 1762 to 1765 Suiding was the seat of the Governor General of Xinjiang, the General of Ili. In 1765 the General of Ili moved to the larger fortress of Huiyuan (惠遠城; Huìyuǎn Chéng).

Huiyuan suffered severe damage during the Dungan Revolt of 1862–77 when the besieged General of Ili, Mingsioi, blew himself up in his palace rather than surrender to the rebels, and during the Russian occupation that followed between 1871–81. The Russians left pursuant to the 1881 Treaty of Saint Petersburg. From 1882 to 1894 the General of Ili resided at Suiding, while a new Huiyuan fortress was being rebuilt.

In 1888 Suiding County (now Huocheng County and Khorgas) was established. Suiding was the county seat.

The town's name was commonly transcribed in the West as Suidun. The 1911 Encyclopædia Britannica described "Suidun" as "a military town, with provision stores, an arsenal and an arms workshop. Its walls are armed with steel guns."

Unlike the city of Yining, originally known as Ningyuan (宁远城; Níngyuǎn Chéng), which has always remained the commercial center of the region, the 19th century Huiyuan/Suiding was mostly a fortress and an administrative town. It was known to the Russians as the New Kuldja, Chinese Kuldja, or Manchu Kuldja, to distinguish it from Yining (the Old Kuldja or the Taranchi Kuldja). This usage is no longer current.

=== People's Republic ===
With the creation of the Ili Prefecture (Chinese: 伊犁专区; pinyin: Yīlí Zhuānqū) in 1950, the then existing Suiding County was included into the Area, as was the neighboring Huocheng County; in 1955, the Ili Special Area became Ili Kazakh Autonomous Prefecture. In 1965, the name Suiding (Chinese: 绥定; pinyin: Suídìng) was replaced with more politically correct Shuiding (Chinese: 水定; pinyin: Shuǐdìng), with 'shui' ('water') replacing 'sui' ("to pacify"). The next year (1966), Shuiding County was merged into Huocheng County, and the Huocheng County county seat was transferred to Shuiding town.

=== Modern period ===
The original Huiyuan site is now a separate town of Huiyuan (Chinese: 惠远镇; pinyin: Huìyuǎn Zhèn) within the same Huocheng County as Shuiding. Huiyuan's population was reported as 20,564 by the Year 2000 Census.

Some of the Qing period buildings, including a bell tower and a "Governor General's Pavilion", have been rebuilt at the Huiyuan site as a tourist attraction, often referred to as the "Huiyuan Old Town" (Chinese: 惠远古城; pinyin: Huìyuǎn Gǔchéng).
