= Beytulla Mosque =

Mosque in Yining, Xinjiang, China

- بەيتۇللاھ مەسچىتى (Uyghur); 拜图拉清真寺 (Chinese)
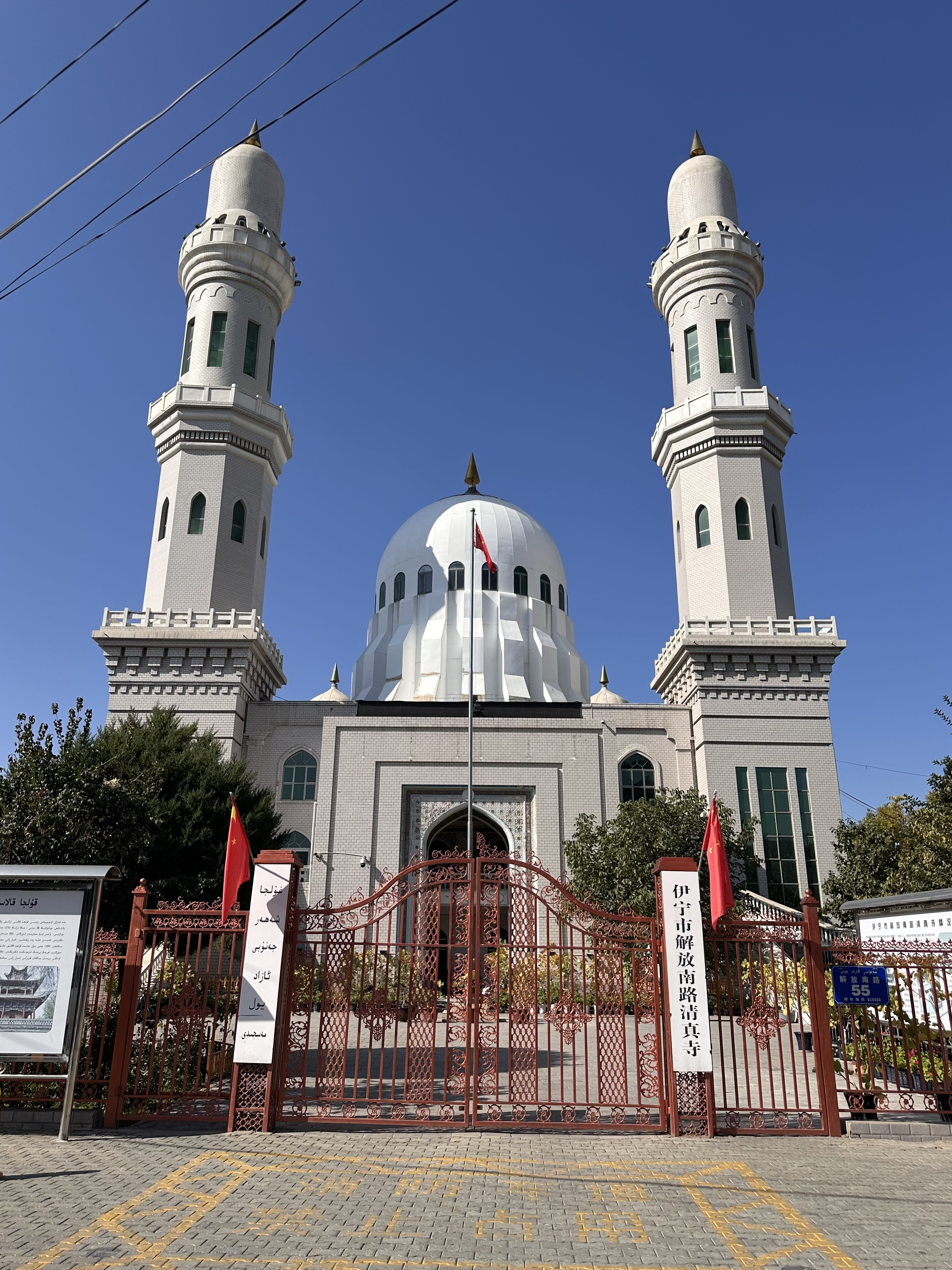
- The Beytulla Mosque in 2025

- Location of the mosque in Northern Xinjiang (Dzungaria) Beytulla Mosque (Xinjiang)

Religion
- Affiliation: Islam
- Status: Active

Location
- Location: Yining, Xinjiang
- Country: China
- Interactive map of Beytulla Mosque
- Coordinates: 43°54′41″N 81°19′13″E

Architecture
- Type: Mosque
- Completed: 1773 CE

Uyghur name
- Uyghur: بەيتۇللاھ مەسچىتى
Transcriptions
- Latin Yëziqi: Beytullah Meschiti

Chinese name
- Simplified Chinese: 拜图拉清真寺
- Traditional Chinese: 拜圖拉清真寺
Transcriptions
Standard Mandarin
- Hanyu Pinyin: Bàitúlā Qīngzhēnsì

Official Chinese name
- Simplified Chinese: 伊宁市解放南路清真寺
- Traditional Chinese: 伊寧市解放南路清真寺
- Literal meaning: Yining City Liberation South Road Mosque
Transcriptions
Standard Mandarin
- Hanyu Pinyin: Yīníng shì Jiěfàng nán lù Qīngzhēnsì

The Beytulla Mosque, (Note: Also transliterated as Baitula, Baitullah or Beytullah.) (Note: Uyghur: بەيتۇللاھ مەسچىتى, romanized: Beytullah Meschiti; Chinese: 拜图拉清真寺; pinyin: Bàitúlā Qīngzhēnsì) officially the Yining Jiefang South Road Mosque, (Note: Chinese: 伊宁市解放南路清真寺; pinyin: Yīníng shì Jiěfàng nán lù Qīngzhēnsì) is the largest mosque in Yining, the capital of Ili Kazakh Autonomous Prefecture in the Xinjiang Uyghur Autonomous Region of China. Its construction was financed by the imperial court of the Qing dynasty and completed in 1773.

== See also ==
- Islam in China
- List of mosques in China
