= G3017 Wuwei–Jinchang Expressway =

Road in Gansu, China

Wuwei–Jinchang Expressway
- 武威－金昌高速公路
- Wujin Expressway 武金高速公路

Route information
- Auxiliary route of G30
- Length: 76.15 km (47.32 mi)

Major junctions
- North end: Gansu S17 in Jinchang, Gansu
- South end: G30 in Wuwei, Gansu

Location
- Country: China

Highway system
- National Trunk Highway System; Primary; Auxiliary; National Highways; Transport in China
← G3016	→ G3018

The G3017 Wuwei–Jinchang Expressway (Chinese: 武威—金昌高速公路), commonly referred to as the Wujin Expressway (Chinese: 武金高速公路), is an expressway that connects the cities of Wuwei and Jinchang in Gansu, China.

== Route ==
Starting from the northwest, the expressway passes through Yongchang County and Jinchuan District in Jinchang before terminating in Liangzhou District, Wuwei. Construction began in October 2010, and the entire expressway was opened on 20 November 2013.
