= Muyesser Abdul'ehed =

Uyghur poet

- Born: Ghulja, China
- Citizenship: Turkey
- Occupations: Poet; teacher
- Writing career
- Pen name: Hendan
- Language: Uyghur language
- Website: facebook.com/AyhanEducation

Muyesser Abdul'ehed is a Uyghur poet and teacher, who has spoken out against civilian internment of Uyghur people by Han, Hui, and Manchu government authorities. She teaches Uyghur language to children of the Uyghur diaspora.

== Early life and education ==
Muyesser was born in Ghulja, a city in the north of Uyghur Autonomous region of Xinjiang in today's People's Republic China in the mid-1980s. She studied medicine at Peking University, followed by an MA in public health, from a Malaysian university. During her undergraduate degree she began to write poetry and following her postgraduate degree decided to pursue a career in creative writing.

== Career ==
In 2013, Muyesser moved to Turkey and established the organisation Ayhan Education, whose purpose is to foster the Uyghur language in diaspora communities. Their work includes publishing a Uyghur language magazine written by children, aimed at their peers. The magazine is called Four Leaf Clover. Prior to the COVID-19 pandemic, Hendan taught in-person language lessons, but since then has moved to digital tuition and reached more students as a result.

Muyesser's writing focuses on the experience of Uyghur people forced to live in internment camps. Her novel Kheyr-khosh, quyash (Farewell to the Sun) is the first novel to describe Uyghur internment camps. Some of her work focuses on women's experiences, including a poem from the perspective of a wife whose husband is interned.

== Personal life ==
As of 2020, Hendan lived in Istanbul. She has spoken out about how her father expected the family to be imprisoned due to civil unrest. She lost contact with her family in 2017 and she has spoken about her feelings of survivor guilt. Her family were forced to cease contact with her due to pressure from the authoritarian state in China, where even being in contact with a relative abroad is a reason for arrest. She believes her cousin, Erpat Ablekrem - a professional football player, was interned as a result of contact with her.

== Awards ==
She was on the list of the BBC's 100 Women announced on 23 November 2020.

== Selected publications ==
- Kheyr-khosh, quyash (2020)
