= Huocheng County =

Huocheng County: 霍城县 (Chinese); قورغاس ناھىيىسى (Uyghur); قورعاس اۋدانى (Kazakh); Korgas County
- County
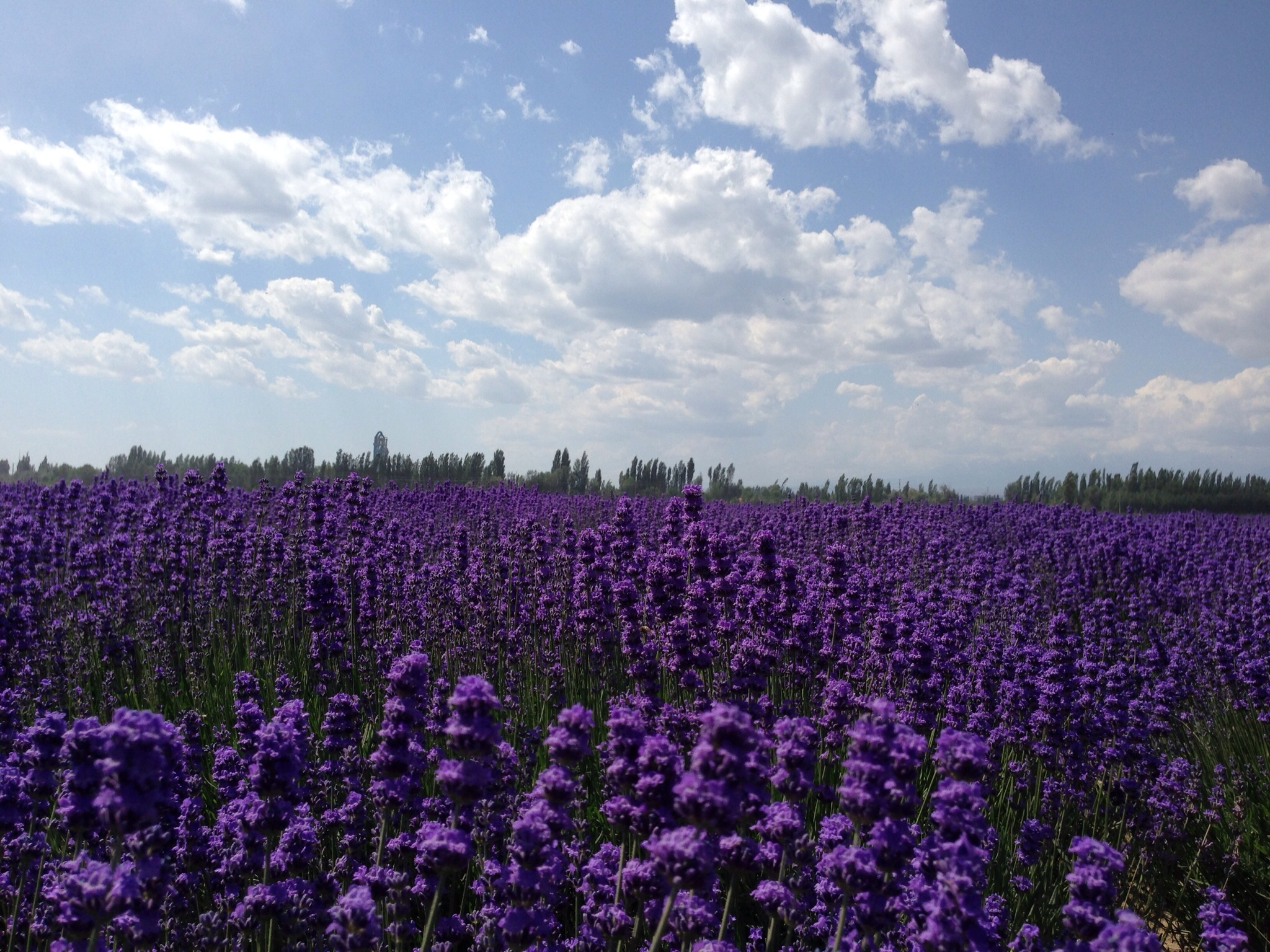
- Lavender farm in Huocheng County

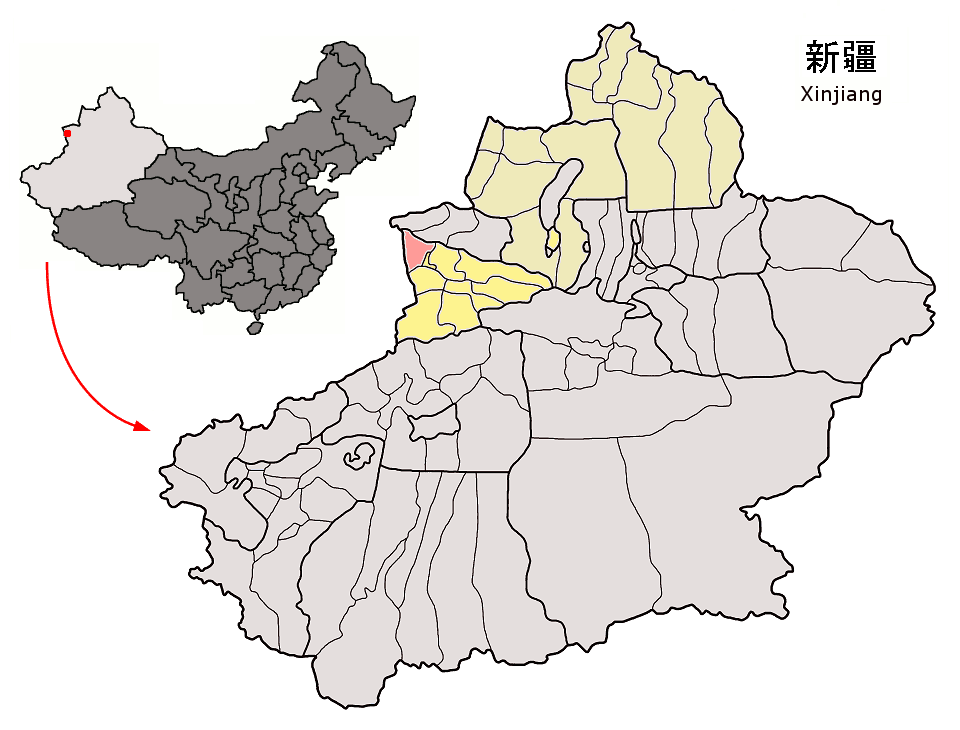
- Location of Huocheng County (pink) in Ili Kazakh Autonomous Prefecture (yellow) and Xinjiang (light grey)

- Location within China Huocheng County (Xinjiang) Huocheng County (China)
- Coordinates: 44°00′36″N 80°48′28″E
- Country: China
- Autonomous region: Xinjiang
- Autonomous prefecture: Ili
- Township-level divisions: 5 towns 3 townships 2 ethnic townships
- County seat: Shuiding

Area
  - Total: 3,027 km^{2} (1,169 sq mi)

Population (2020)
  - Total: 243,303
  - Density: 80.38/km^{2} (208.2/sq mi)
- Time zone: UTC+8 (China Standard (Note: Locals in Xinjiang frequently observe UTC+6 (Xinjiang Time), 2 hours behind Beijing.))
- Website: www.xjhc.gov.cn

Huocheng County

Chinese name
- Simplified Chinese: 霍城县
- Traditional Chinese: 霍城縣
Transcriptions
Standard Mandarin
- Hanyu Pinyin: Huòchéng Xiàn

Alternative Chinese name
- Simplified Chinese: 霍尔果斯县
Transcriptions
Standard Mandarin
- Hanyu Pinyin: Huò'ěrguǒsī Xiàn

Uyghur name
- Uyghur: قورغاس ناھىيىسى
Transcriptions
- Latin Yëziqi: Qorghas Nahiyisi
- Yengi Yeziⱪ: Ⱪorƣas Naⱨiyisi
- SASM/GNC: Korgas Xahiri
- Siril Yëziqi: Қорғас Наһийиси

Huocheng County (Chinese: 霍城县; pinyin: Huòchéng xiàn), also known as Korgas County (Kazakh: قورعاس اۋدانى; Uyghur: قورغاس ناھىيىسى; Chinese: 霍尔果斯县), is situated within the Xinjiang Uyghur Autonomous Region and falls under the administration of the Ili Kazakh Autonomous Prefecture. The county is located between Yining and the border city of Khorgas, covering an area of 5,466 km^{2} (2,110 sq mi), with a population of 360,000 (2004 estimate). There are twenty-nine ethnic groups residing in the county, including the Han and Uyghur nationalities.

To the north of Huocheng County is Wenquan County, while the Ili River lies to the south. Its Western side is bordered by Khorgas City, and Yining is located approximately 45 km (28 mi) to the east.

== History ==
Within Huocheng County, lies the significant ruined site of ancient Almaliq. Additionally, the mausoleum of the first khan of Moghulistan, Tughlugh Timur, is also located within the county.

During the 1760s, nine fortresses were constructed in the Ili River Basin, and four of them were situated within the modern Huocheng County. Huiyuan served as the headquarters of the General of Ili, making it the military and administrative center of Xinjiang until the 1860s.

Suiding County (绥定县) was established in 1888, with Suiding as the county seat. In 1914, the western area of Shuiding County was organized into Khorgas County, later abbreviated to Huocheng County, with Gongchen (Khorgas) as county seat. In 1965 Suiding was renamed Shuiding. In 1966, Shuiding County merged into Huocheng County with Shuiding as the county seat of the new Huocheng County. In 2014, Khorgas became a county-level city separate from Huocheng County.

== Administrative divisions ==
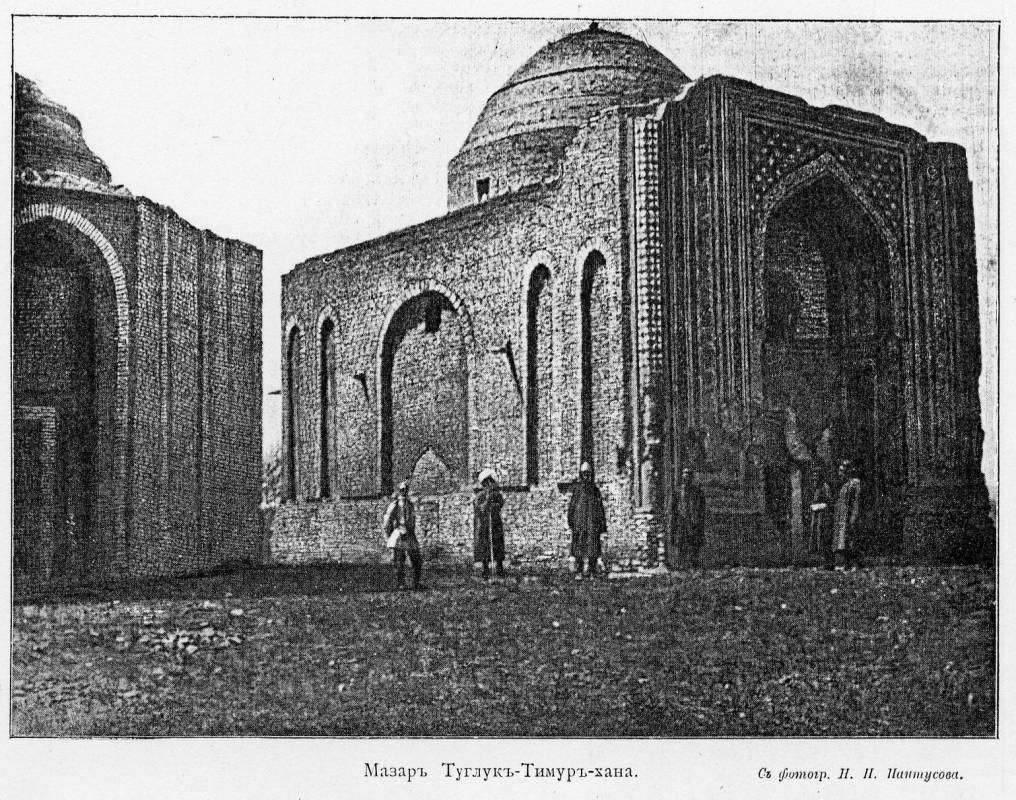
Tughlugh Timur Mausoleum (zh), some 30 km northwest of the county seat

The county includes 6 towns, 2 townships, and 1 ethnic township.

Name	Simplified Chinese	Hanyu Pinyin	Uyghur (UEY)	Uyghur Latin (ULY)	Number of communities	Population (thousand)	Land area (km2)
Towns
Shuiding Town (Süydüng Town)	水定镇	Shuǐdìng Zhèn	سۈيدۈڭ بازىرى	süydüng baziri	13	3	14.9
Qingshuihe Town (Chingsixoza Town)	清水河镇	Qīngshuǐhé Zhèn	چىڭسىخوزا بازىرى	chingsixoza baziri	15	46.7	185.2
Lucaogou Town (Losigung Town)	芦草沟镇	Lúcǎogōu Zhèn	لۇسىگۇڭ بازىرى	lusigung baziri	11	35.4	346
Huiyuan Town (Küre Town)	惠远镇	Huìyuǎn Zhèn	كۈرە بازىرى	küre baziri	4	21.4	138.6
Sarbulaq Town	萨尔布拉克镇	Sà'ěrbùlākè Zhèn	ساربۇلاق بازىرى	sarbulaq baziri	11	28.2	431.7
Lengger Town	兰干镇	Lángàn Zhèn	لەڭگەر بازىرى	lengger baziri	13	3	14.9
Townships
Sendoxoza Township (Sandaohe Township)	三道河乡	Sāndàohé Xiāng	سەندوخوزا يېزىسى	sendoxoza yëzisi	3	9.3	78.7
Dashigu Township (Daxigou Township)	大西沟乡	Dàxīgōu Xiāng	داشىگۇ يېزىسى	dashigu yëzisi	7	10.8	252.7
Ethnic Township
Sengung Township (Sangong Township)	三宫乡 (三宫回族乡)	Sāngōng Xiāng (Sāngōng Huízú Xiāng)	سەنگۇڭ خۇيزۇ يېزىسى	sengung xuyzu yëzisi	5	15	126.9

== Climate ==
Climate data for Huocheng, elevation 640 m (2,100 ft), (1991–2020 normals, extremes 1991–present)
Month	Jan	Feb	Mar	Apr	May	Jun	Jul	Aug	Sep	Oct	Nov	Dec	Year
Record high °C (°F)	10.1 (50.2)	16.6 (61.9)	28.2 (82.8)	34.7 (94.5)	37.1 (98.8)	36.9 (98.4)	41.9 (107.4)	39.4 (102.9)	36.4 (97.5)	32.4 (90.3)	25.2 (77.4)	14.5 (58.1)	41.9 (107.4)
Mean daily maximum °C (°F)	−1.9 (28.6)	1.8 (35.2)	12.2 (54.0)	21.5 (70.7)	26.4 (79.5)	30.3 (86.5)	32.3 (90.1)	31.4 (88.5)	26.8 (80.2)	18.8 (65.8)	8.9 (48.0)	0.6 (33.1)	17.4 (63.4)
Daily mean °C (°F)	−7.7 (18.1)	−3.7 (25.3)	5.7 (42.3)	13.9 (57.0)	18.7 (65.7)	22.7 (72.9)	24.4 (75.9)	23.1 (73.6)	18.0 (64.4)	10.4 (50.7)	2.7 (36.9)	−4.7 (23.5)	10.3 (50.5)
Mean daily minimum °C (°F)	−12.4 (9.7)	−8.4 (16.9)	0.4 (32.7)	7.5 (45.5)	12.0 (53.6)	16.0 (60.8)	17.4 (63.3)	15.7 (60.3)	10.5 (50.9)	4.2 (39.6)	−1.6 (29.1)	−8.8 (16.2)	4.4 (39.9)
Record low °C (°F)	−28.3 (−18.9)	−26.7 (−16.1)	−19.3 (−2.7)	−7.0 (19.4)	−0.5 (31.1)	7.9 (46.2)	9.5 (49.1)	4.2 (39.6)	−1.6 (29.1)	−6.7 (19.9)	−16.5 (2.3)	−30.4 (−22.7)	−30.4 (−22.7)
Average precipitation mm (inches)	18.4 (0.72)	20.1 (0.79)	17.6 (0.69)	26.3 (1.04)	23.5 (0.93)	27.7 (1.09)	22.5 (0.89)	17.8 (0.70)	12.2 (0.48)	21.3 (0.84)	30.0 (1.18)	22.8 (0.90)	260.2 (10.25)
Average precipitation days (≥ 0.1 mm)	8.6	7.7	6.5	7.6	7.7	7.8	7.8	6.0	5.0	5.7	7.7	8.8	86.9
Average snowy days	10.4	8.7	3.5	0.8	0.1	0	0	0	0	0.5	4.2	10.3	38.5
Average relative humidity (%)	76	74	63	53	52	53	53	53	54	64	73	77	62
Mean monthly sunshine hours	151.8	166.8	233.5	268.8	318.2	318.7	338.0	325.3	278.5	226.1	154.5	135.4	2,915.6
Percentage possible sunshine	52	55	62	66	69	69	73	77	76	68	55	49	64
Source: China Meteorological Administrationall-time extreme temperature

== Demographics ==
Breakdown of nationalities in Huocheng County
Nationality	Percentage
Han	33.6%
Uyghurs	26.8%
Huis	23.8%
Kazakhs	9.0%
Xibe	0.4%
Mongols	0.2%
Others	6.2%
Source of the population statistics :

== Economy ==
In agriculture, the local population cultivate wheat, corn and other crops including sugar beet, cotton, tobacco, apples, animal husbandry with cattle and sheep.

The main minerals extracted in the area include coal, phosphorus, iron, gold, silver, copper, limestone, Iceland spar and marble, etc.

== Transport ==
Huocheng is served by China National Highway 312 and the Jinghe-Yining-Khorgas Railway.

There is a border crossing into Kazakhstan at Khorgas, where the road continues to Zharkent in Panfilov District.

The Jinghe–Yining–Khorgas Railway through Huocheng county was completed in 2010, reaching practically to the Kazakhstan border. There are plans to construct a connecting railway line on the Kazakh side, creating China's second railway link to Central Asia besides Alashankou.
