= Huiyuan, Xinjiang =

Huiyuan Hweiyüan
- Town
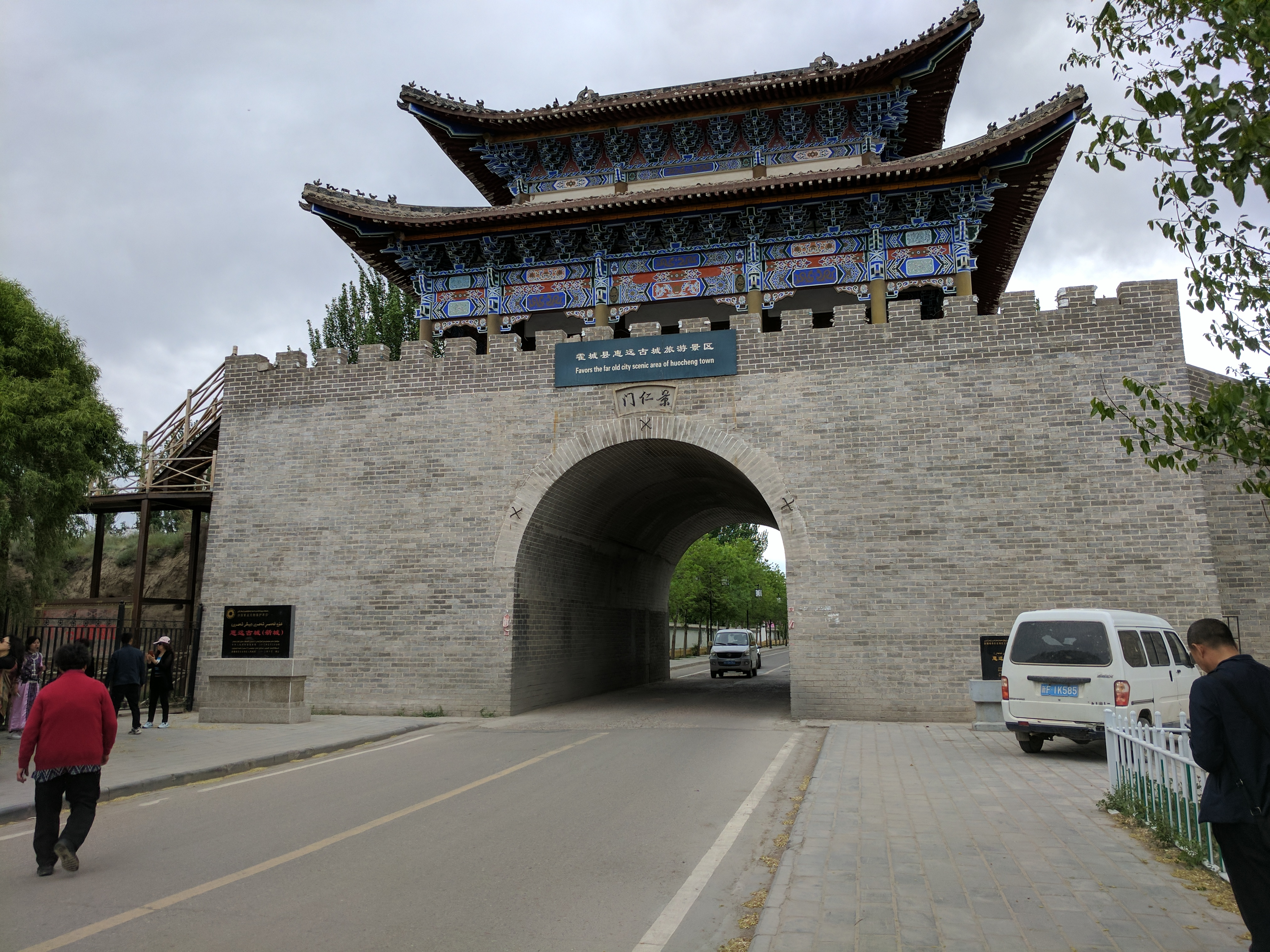
- East gate of the old town

- Location in Xinjiang Huiyuan (China)
- Coordinates: 43°59′33″N 80°54′27″E
- Country: China
- Province: Xinjiang
- Prefecture: Ili Kazakh Autonomous Prefecture
- County: Huocheng County
- 20564

Huiyuan (simplified Chinese: 惠远镇; traditional Chinese: 惠遠鎮; pinyin: Huìyuǎn Zhèn; Uyghur: كۈرە بازىرى) is a town located within Huocheng County, in the Ili Kazakh Autonomous Prefecture of Xinjiang, China. It is situated close to the Ili River, some 30 kilometres (19 mi) to the west of Yining, the main city of the prefecture and some 8 kilometres (5.0 mi) south of Shuiding, the county seat. As of the 2000 census, Huiyuan's population was reported as 20,564.

Between 1762 and 1866 the Huiyuan Fortress or Huiyuan City (惠远城, Huìyuǎn Chéng), the center of the Chinese authority in Xinjiang, was located within the southern area of the modern Huiyuan town.

== History ==
=== Qing dynasty ===
Once part of the Dzungar Khanate, this area was annexed by the Manchus-led Qing in the 1750s. The Old Huiyuan fort was built in 1764 during the reign of the Qianlong Emperor after the Revolt of the Altishahr Khojas. It acted as the center of Manchu military power and civilian administration in Xinjiang. The main fortress of the "Nine Forts" of Ili (see Ili Kazakh Autonomous Prefecture#Qing dynasty for the history of the region), Huiyuan was the seat of the Governor-general of the region, the General of Ili. The fort was located less than 1 kilometre (0.62 mi) north the Ili river in the modern Laocheng Village (老城村) in the south of the modern Huiyuan.

Huiyuan suffered severe damage during the Muslim Rebellion of the 1860s. Besieged in his palace, the then General of Ili, Mingsioi would blow himself up rather than surrender to the rebels. The fort was completely destroyed during the Russian occupation that followed in 1871-81.

The Russians left pursuant to the 1881 Treaty of Saint Petersburg (1881), and in 1882 the military-administrative center moved to Suiding (now known as Shuiding), some 10 kilometres (6.2 mi) north of the river, while a new Huiyuan fortress and the adjunct military-administrative town were rebuilt near the center of modern Huiyuan about 5 kilometres (3.1 mi) north of the river. The headquarters of the General of Ili moved back to the new Huiyuan fort in 1894 after the reconstruction was completed.

While Kuldja (now Yining) remained the commercial center of the region throughout, Huiyuan (and then its successor Suiding) acquired a great deal of importance from their fortifications and the Chinese administration based there. Prior to its destruction, Huiyuan was also known as Ili and, to Europeans, as Kuldja or as New Kuldja, Chinese Kuldja, or Manchu Kuldja to distinguish it from the Old, Taranchi, or Tartar Kuldja at Yining.

== Present ==
James A. Millward, writing in 1998, said that the only surviving remains of the Qing era structures were a drum tower and a section of the wall that used to enclose the Jiangjun's yamen. However, it has been reported that some of the Qing period buildings, including a bell tower and a "Governor General's Pavilion", have since been rebuilt at the site of the 1882 new Huiyuan fort as a tourist attraction, often referred to as the "Ancient Huiyuan Town" (惠远古城), not to be confused with the site of the old Huiyuan fort (惠远老城).
