= Mingsioi =

Qing Chinese general

Mingsioi (Manchu:) or Mingxu (simplified Chinese: 明绪; traditional Chinese: 明緒; pinyin: Míngxù; Wade–Giles: Ming-hsü) was the Qing General of Ili in 1864–66, charged with the overall command of the Chinese troops in Xinjiang.

Mingsioi's predecessor, Cangcing (常清; Cháng qīng) was sacked after the defeat of Qing troops at Wusu during the Dungan revolt. Mingsioi commanded the defense of the Ili Region against the Dungan and Taranchi rebels for the next two years. With most of Xinjiang and Gansu under rebel control, he could not expect to receive any aid from China; meanwhile neighboring Russia would not be interested in seriously helping the Qing against the Muslim rebels either.

Mingsioi's last stand was on March 8, 1866 at his headquarters at Fort Huiyuan. As the rebels were seizing the fort from its starving defendants, Mingsioi assembled his family, staff, treasury, and tea into his palace and set off the gunpowder.
