= China National Highway 218 =

Road in China

National Highway 218
- 218国道

Route information
- Length: 1,067 km (663 mi)

Major junctions
- From: Yining, Xinjiang
- To: Ruoqiang, Xinjiang

Location
- Country: China

Highway system
- National Trunk Highway System; Primary; Auxiliary
← G217	→ G219

China National Highway 218 (G218) runs from Yining, Xinjiang to Ruoqiang, Bayingolin Mongol Autonomous Prefecture, Xinjiang. It is 1,067 kilometres in length and runs southeast from Yining towards Ruoqiang. The road starts at the Kazakh border. (West of Yining it may have a different number (?).) It passes Yining (Kulja) and follows the natural trade route east along the upper valley of the Ili River. It enters higher country and south of Urumchi turns south and crosses the Tien Shan mountains. It then enters the oasis country around Korla and Karashahr and then crosses the Tarim Basin along the old bed to the Tarim River to Ruoqiang (Charkilik) on the south side of the basin. With highways 314 and 315 it forms a loop around most of the Tarim basin.

== Route and distance ==
Route and distance

City	Distance (km)
Yining, Xinjiang	0
Korla, Xinjiang	623
Yuli County, Xinjiang	677
Ruoqiang, Xinjiang	1067

== See also ==
- China National Highways
