= Yining =

County-level city in Xinjiang, China

Yining: 伊宁市 (Chinese); غۇلجا (Uyghur); قۇلجا (Kazakh); Ghulja, Kulja, Ningyuan, Khobak Sari
- County-level city
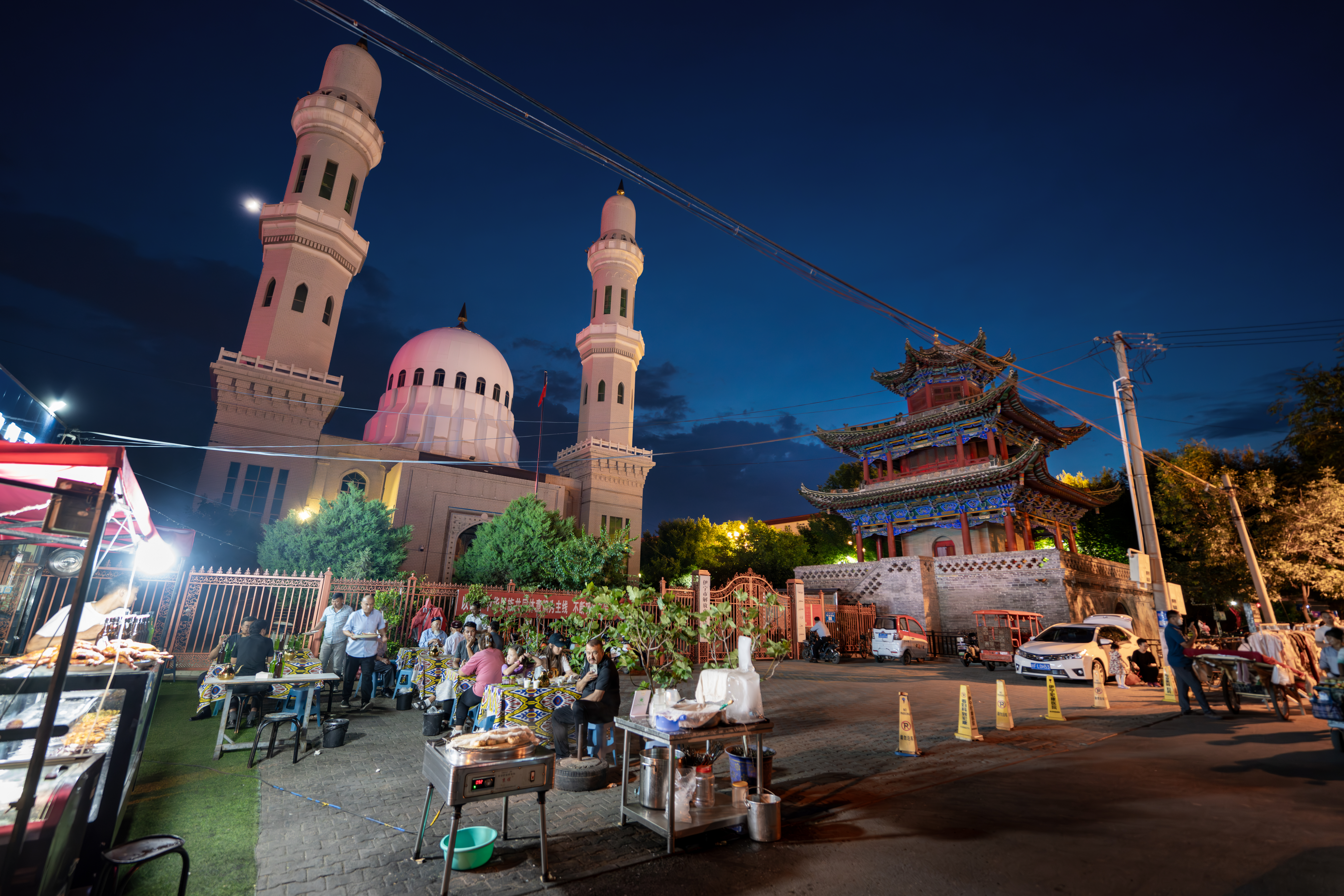
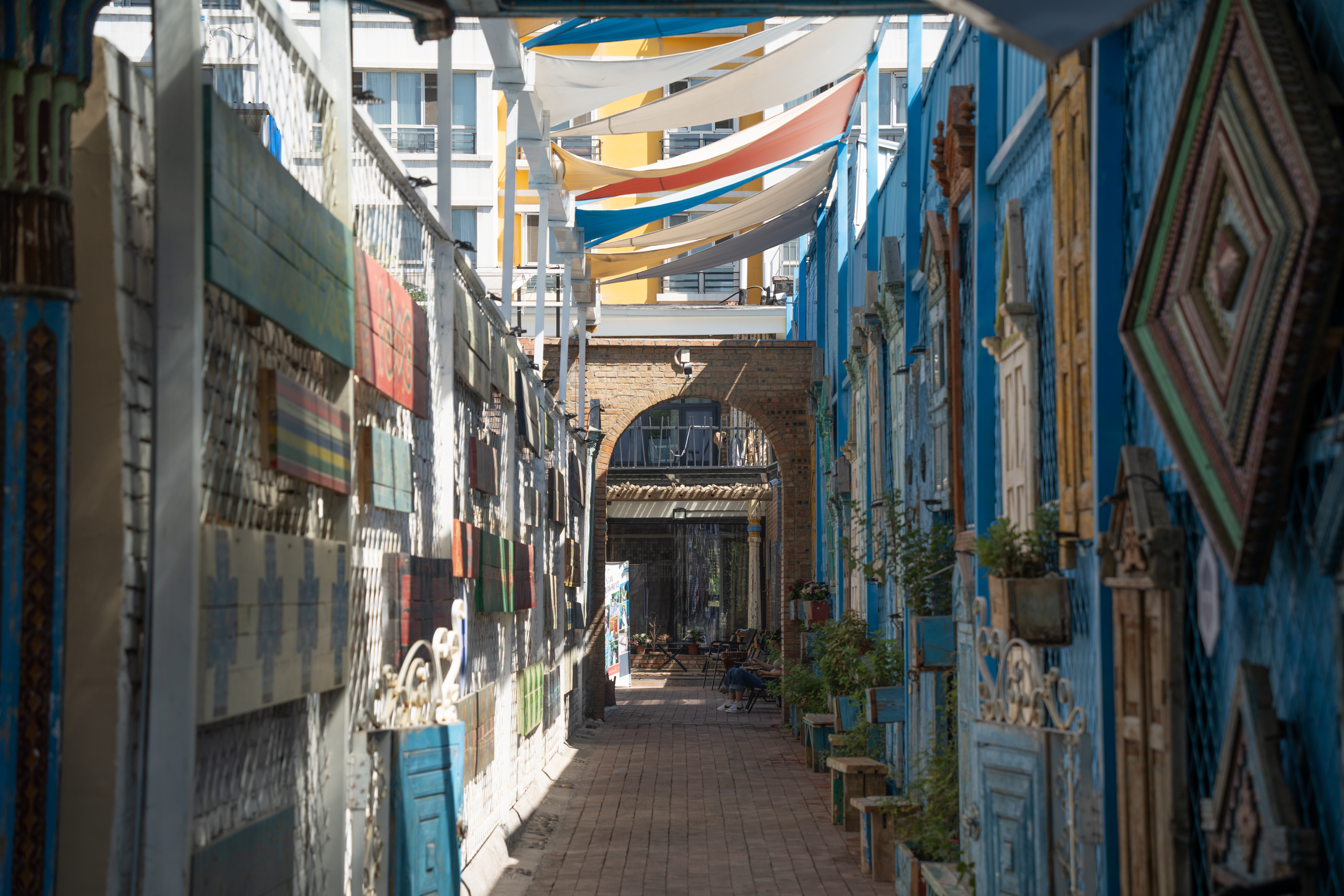
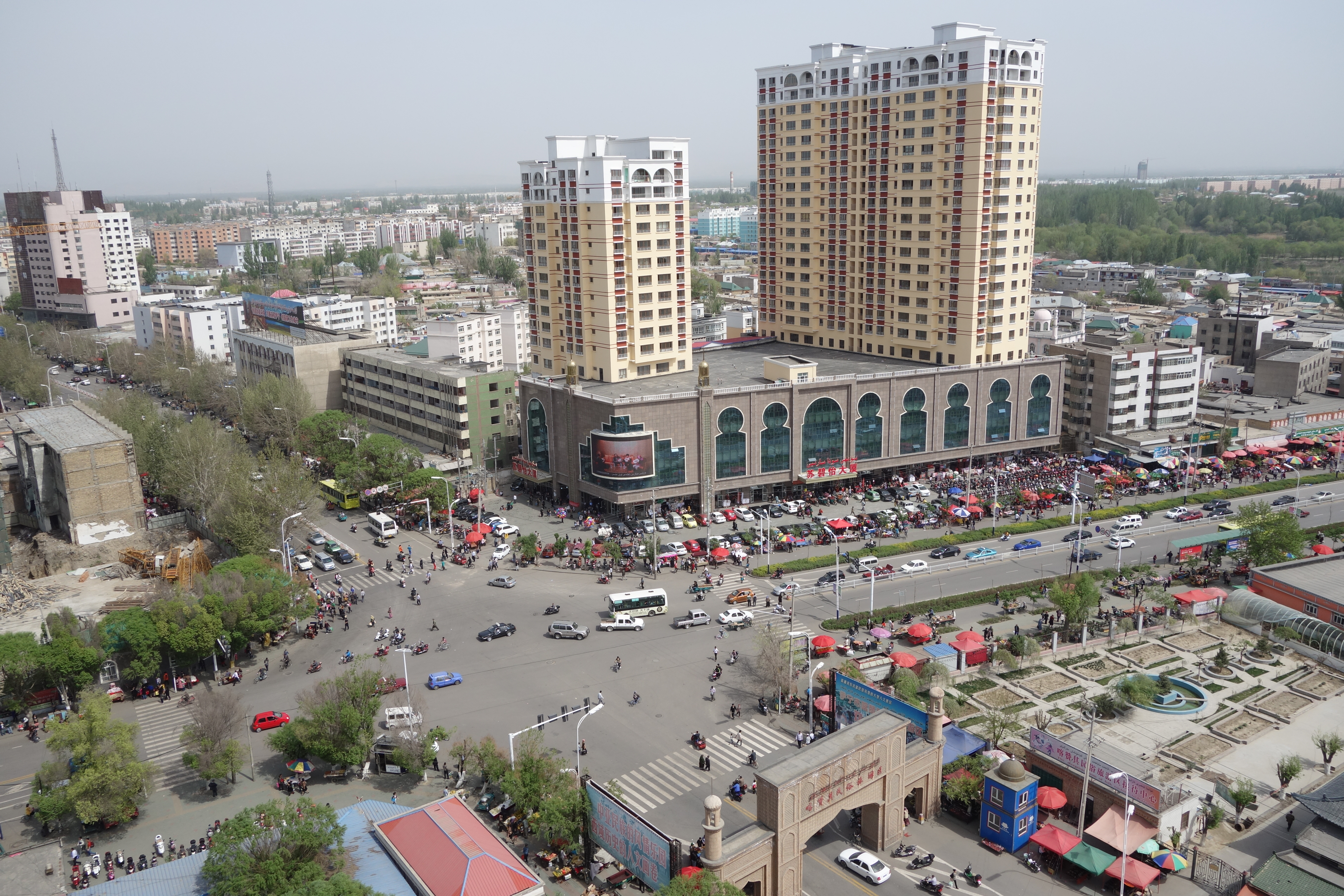
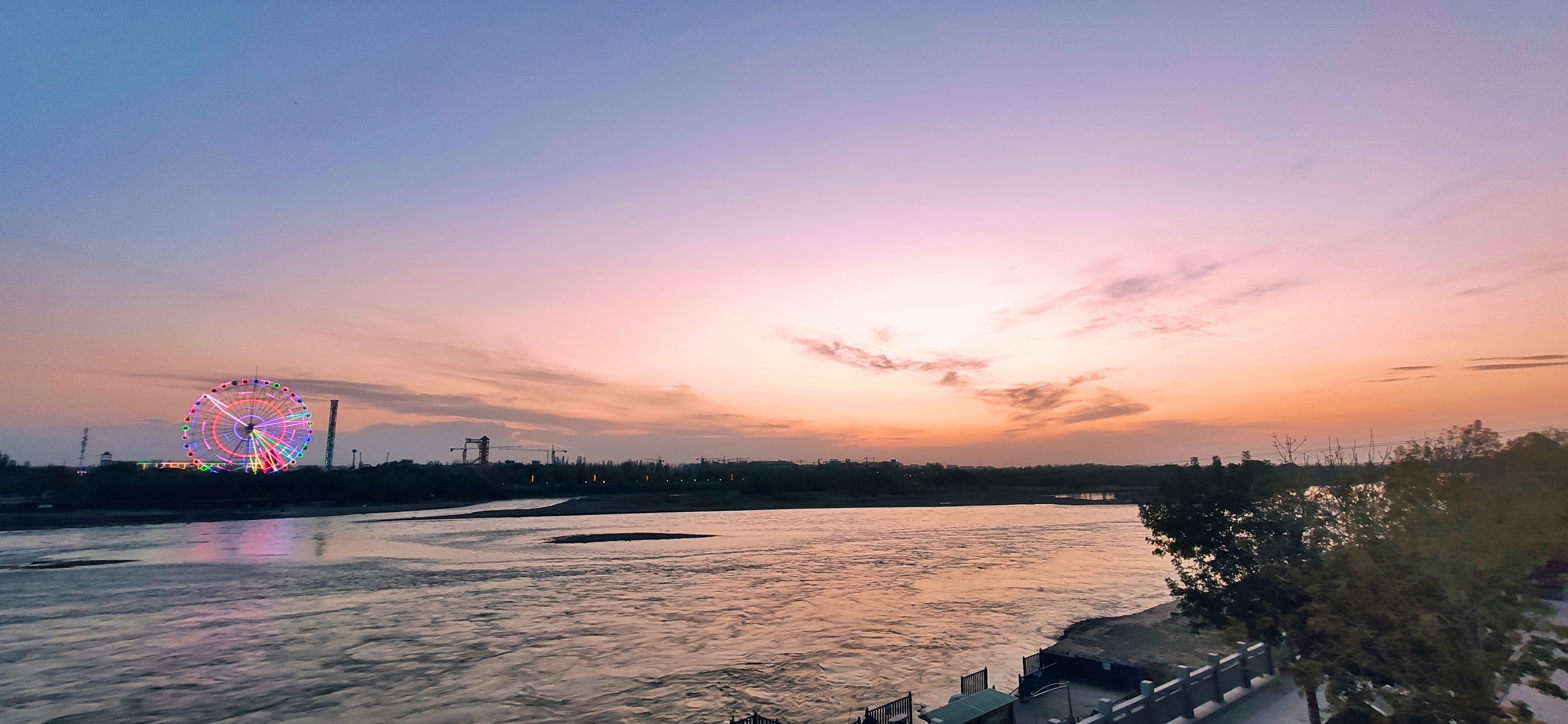
- Beytulla Mosque Liuxingjie Neighborhood Downtown Yining Ili River

- Location in Xinjiang Yining (Xinjiang) Yining (China)
- Coordinates (Yining municipal government): 43°54′29″N 81°16′40″E
- Country: China
- Autonomous region: Xinjiang
- Autonomous prefecture: Ili
- Establishment of the city as the capital city of the Dzungar Khanate: 1630's
- Founder: Erdeni Batur
- Municipal seat: Döngmehelle Subdistrict

Area
  - County-level city: 616.7 km^{2} (238.1 sq mi)
  - Urban: 49 km^{2} (19 sq mi)

Population (2020)
  - County-level city: 778,047
  - Density: 1,262/km^{2} (3,268/sq mi)
  - Urban (2018): 345,000
  - Urban density: 7,000/km^{2} (18,000/sq mi)
- Time zone: UTC+8 (China Standard (Note: Locals in Xinjiang frequently observe UTC+6 (Xinjiang Time), 2 hours behind Beijing.))
- Postal code: 835000
- Area code: 0999
- Website: Official website

Yining

Chinese name
- Simplified Chinese: 伊宁
- Traditional Chinese: 伊寧
Transcriptions
Standard Mandarin
- Hanyu Pinyin: Yīníng
- Wade–Giles: I^{1}-ning^{2}

Alternative Chinese name
- Chinese: 固勒扎
Transcriptions
Standard Mandarin
- Hanyu Pinyin: Gùlèzhā
- Wade–Giles: Ku^{4}-lê^{4}-cha^{1}

Ningyuan
- Simplified Chinese: 宁远
- Traditional Chinese: 寧遠
Transcriptions
Standard Mandarin
- Hanyu Pinyin: Níngyuǎn

Tibetan name
- Tibetan: གུལ་ཅ
Transcriptions
- Wylie: gul ca

Mongolian name
- Mongolian Cyrillic: Хулж
- Mongolian script: ᠬᠤᠯᠵᠠ

Uyghur name
- Uyghur: غۇلجا
Transcriptions
- Latin Yëziqi: Ghulja
- Yengi Yeziⱪ: Ƣulja
- SASM/GNC: Ĝulja
- Siril Yëziqi: Ғулҗа

Manchu name
- Manchu script: ᡤᡡᠯᠵᠠ
- Abkai: Gvlja
- Möllendorff: Gūlja

Russian name
- Russian: Кульджа
- Romanization: Kuldzha

Kazakh name
- Kazakh: قۇلجا; Құлжа; Qulja

Oirat name
- Oirat: ᡎᡇᠯᠴᠠ

Chagatay name
- Chagatay: غولجا

Yining (Chinese: 伊宁), also known as Ghulja (Uyghur: غۇلجا) or Kulja (Kazakh: قۇلجا), is a county-level city in northwestern Xinjiang, China. It is the administrative seat and largest city of Ili Kazakh Autonomous Prefecture. Yining is the modern successor to the nearby ruined city of Almaliq, Huocheng County, and is the third largest city in Xinjiang after Ürümqi and Korla. It was established by Erdeni Batur Khong Tayiji, of the Dzungar Khanate.

== Area and population ==
The city of Yining is a county-level administrative unit located along Ili River. As of 2015, it has an estimated population of 542,507, with a total land area of 629 km^{2} (243 sq mi). It is the most populous city in the Ili Kazakh Autonomous Prefecture.

The land area and population of the City of Yining saw an increase in 2003; the increase resulted from the transfer of two villages with some 100 km^{2} (39 sq mi) of land from the adjacent Yining County, which is a separate administrative unit from the city.

Yining's population is primarily Uyghur, Han, Hui, and Kazakh, along with smaller numbers of people of Mongolian, Xibe, Uzbek, Russian, or other ethnicity.

== History ==
=== Note on historical place names ===
From the 13 to 15th century, it was under the control of Chagatai Khanate. Another Mongol empire—the Dzungar Khanate—established around Ili area. In the 19th and early 20th century, the word Kulja, (from Russian: Кульджа) or Ghulja was often used in Russia, and in the West as the name for the entire Chinese part of the Ili River basin as well as for its two main cities. In fact, the 1911 Encyclopædia Britannica clarifies the distinction between two similarly named cities of its time:

- Kulja (i.e. today's Yining) or more specifically Old Kulja (elsewhere, also called Taranchi Kulja), which was the commercial center of the region.
- Suidun (i.e. Suiding, now called Shuiding) or more specifically New Kulja, Manchu Kulja, or Ili (elsewhere, also Chinese Kulja), the Chinese fortress and the regional capital.

Until the 1860s, Huiyuan to the south of Suiding was the regional capital.

=== Establishment and Dzungar Khanate ===
After the establishment of the Dzungar Khanate, Erdeni Batur, the first Khong Tayiji of the nation, built the city named as Khobak Sari, as the capital city of the Dzungar Khanate, which featured a monastery. New buildings such as warehouses, urban centers, and settlements were also installed, as Erdeni Batur encouraged civilians to settle in the city. He also promoted Buddhism, use of the Clear Script created by the Oirat Monk, Zaya Pandita, and created laws for practice of animal husbandry, and handicrafts. According to Russian diplomats, the city was made of bricks and defended by 4 cannons.

Limited agricultural practices were also present in the city during the reign of Erdeni Batur. Later during Tsewang Rabtan Khan, and Galdan Tseren Khan's rule, Uyghurs were sent to the city to practice agriculture, and horticulture in the capital. The city was also introduced with irrigation system and were able to supply the city needs with their agricultural reforms. Farmers were common, which Slaves from Bukhara, and Dzungar civilians themselves engaged in agriculture, producing wheat, barley, millet, pumpkins, melons, grapes, apricots, and apples. Merchants were also frequent in the city, reportedly achieving economic growth from their available goods. Later, Galdan Tseren Khan established two monasteries in the Ili River, with one of them built at the capital city. As it was about 3 story tall, and about 1 li tall. It was later destroyed during the rebellion of Amursana, which Qianlong emperor later rebuilt it as Anyuan temple, in 1764 which resembled the old temple to cherish the men afar.

=== Qing dynasty ===
The fort of Ningyuan (寧遠城) was built in 1762 to accommodate new settlers from southern Xinjiang. The forts of Huining, (惠寧城) and Xichun (熙春城) built later in 1765 and 1780 were also located within the modern Yining City.

The Sino-Russian Treaty of Kulja 1851 opened the area for trade.

In 1864–66, the city suffered severely from fighting during the Dungan Revolt. The city, and the rest of the Ili River basin were seized by the Russians, in 1871, during Yakub Beg's independent rule of Kashgaria. It was restored to the Chinese under the terms of the Treaty of Saint Petersburg (1881). In 1888, the Ningyuan County was established.

The Geographical Magazine in 1875 by Sir Clements Robert Markham stated:

What little industry Kulja possesses is all due to the Chinese, who transplanted the taste for art, assiduity and skillfulness of their pigtailed race, even to these western outskirts of "the celestial flowery dominion of the Middle." Had the Taranjis, and Kalmuks been left to themselves, or had they remained in a preponderating majority, Kulja would not be a bit farther advanced than either Yarkand or Aksu. The principal trades are the following: — founders, manufacturing kettles, plates, and other implements of a very primitive form; papermakers, whose productions do not seem to be superior to the paper manufactured at the present time after Chinese patterns at Khokand and Samarkand. There are, moreover, some confectionaries in which cakes of all shapes are baked of rice and millet, overlaid with sugar; also, macaroni-makers, the Taranjis being notoriously very fond of dried farinaceous food. In Eastern Turkestan there still exist many similar trades, and although their products are not equal to European articles of the same kind—I mean here the fabrics of the formerly western Chinese provinces— they are still said to be profitable. Finally, among the tradesmen we may mention millers, vinegar manufacturers and potters. The number of factories amount to-day at Kulja to 38, wherein over 131 hands are occupied. To these of course other tradespeople have to be added, such as 169 bootmakers, 50 blacksmiths, 48 carpenters, 11 brass-founders, 3 silversmiths, 26 stonecutters, and 2 tailors.

=== Republic of China ===
In 1914, the Ningyuan County was renamed Yining County to avoid confusion with other places in China named Ningyuan.

=== East Turkestan Republic ===
Ghulja was the site of the 7 November 1944 East Turkestan Revolution and served as capital city of the Second East Turkestan Republic from 12 November 1944 until 22 December 1949.

=== People's Republic ===
Yining became a separate city from Yining County in 1952. In 1962, major Sino-Soviet clashes took place along the Ili River.

In 1997, in what came to be known as the Ghulja incident, the city was rocked by two days of demonstrations or riots.

== Geography ==
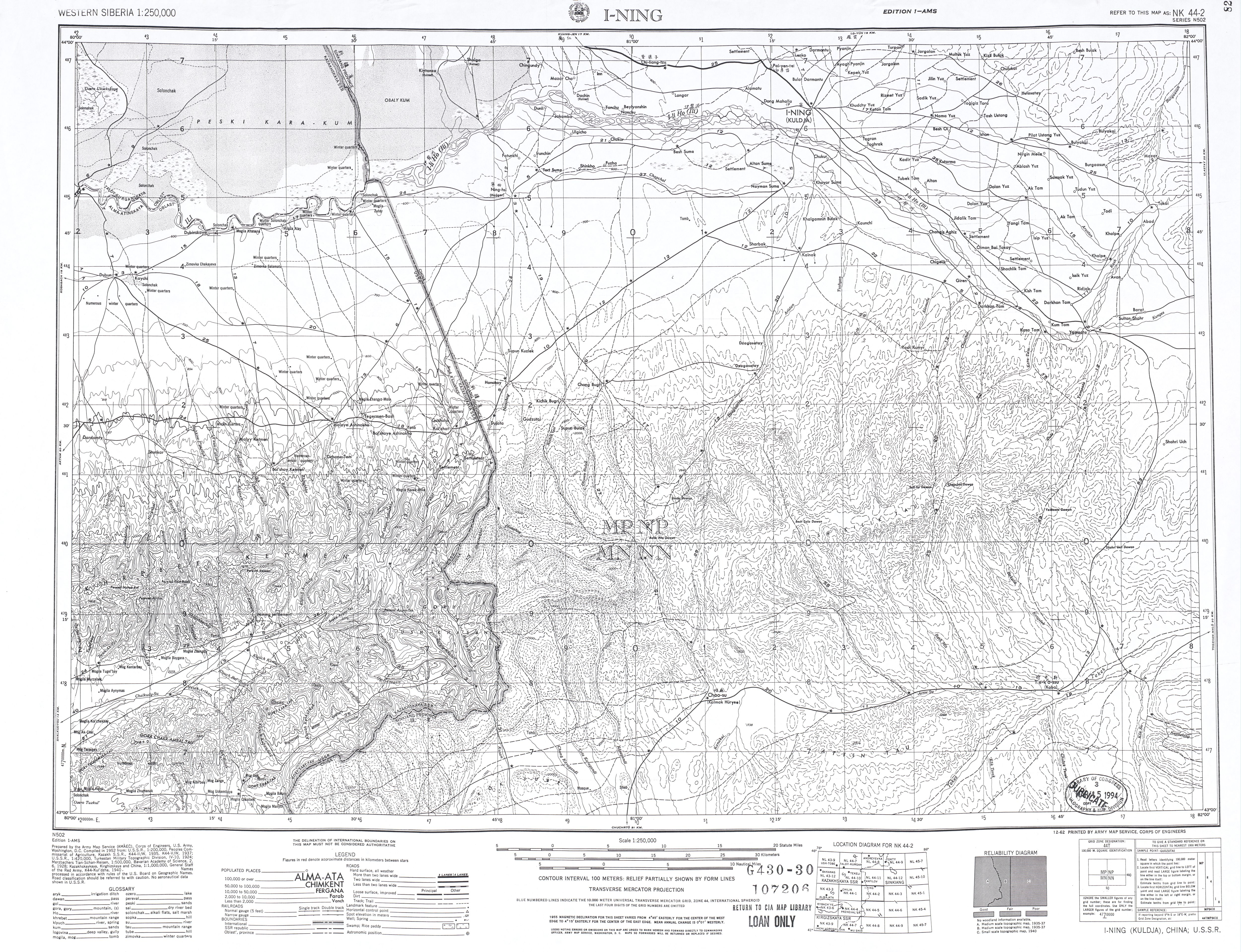
Yining (labeled I-NING (KULDJA) 伊寧) (1952)

Yining (Gulja)

Climate chart (precipitation, max. and min. temperature)
J	F	M	A	M	J	J	A	S	O	N	D
21 −1 −13	21 2 −9	21 12 0	33 21 7	30 26 11	28 29 15	28 32 17	19 31 15	15 26 10	25 19 4	37 9 −2	28 1 −9
- █ Average max. and min. temperatures in °C
- █ Precipitation totals in mm
- Source: CMA
Imperial conversion
J	F	M	A	M	J	J	A	S	O	N	D
0.8 30 9	0.8 36 16	0.8 54 32	1.3 70 45	1.2 79 52	1.1 84 59	1.1 90 63	0.7 88 59	0.6 79 50	1 66 39	1.5 48 28	1.1 34 16
- █ Average max. and min. temperatures in °F
- █ Precipitation totals in inches

Yining is located on the northern side of the Ili River in the Dzungarian basin, about 70 km (43 mi) east of the border with Kazakhstan, and about 710 km (440 mi) west of Ürümqi. The Ili River valley is far wetter than most of Xinjiang and has rich grazing land.

The City of Yining borders on Huocheng County in the west and the Yining County in the east; across the river in the south is Qapqal Xibe Autonomous County.

=== Climate ===
Yining has a semiarid climate (Köppen BSk), without the strong variation in seasonal precipitation seen across most of China. Dry and sunny weather dominates year-round. Winters are cold, with a January average of −7.6 °C (18.3 °F). Yet the influence of the Dzungarian Alatau to the northwest and Borohoro Mountains to the northeast helps keep the city warmer than more easterly locales on a similar latitude. Summers are hot, with a July average of 23.9 °C (75.0 °F). Diurnal temperature ranges tend to be large from April to October. The annual mean temperature is 10.0 °C (50.0 °F). With monthly percent possible sunshine ranging from 51% in December to 77% in September, sunshine is abundant and the city receives 2,914.7 hours of bright sunshine annually. Extremes since 1951 have ranged from −40.4 °C (−40.7 °F) on 29 January 1969 to 40.9 °C (105.6 °F) on 20 July 2026.

Climate data for Yining, elevation 663 m (2,175 ft), (1991–2020 normals, extremes 1951–present)
Month	Jan	Feb	Mar	Apr	May	Jun	Jul	Aug	Sep	Oct	Nov	Dec	Year
Record high °C (°F)	12.5 (54.5)	19.6 (67.3)	28.3 (82.9)	34.4 (93.9)	36.6 (97.9)	37.2 (99.0)	40.9 (105.6)	38.4 (101.1)	37.3 (99.1)	31.1 (88.0)	25.0 (77.0)	15.1 (59.2)	40.9 (105.6)
Mean daily maximum °C (°F)	−1.1 (30.0)	2.2 (36.0)	12.0 (53.6)	21.1 (70.0)	25.7 (78.3)	29.6 (85.3)	31.6 (88.9)	30.8 (87.4)	26.2 (79.2)	18.6 (65.5)	9.0 (48.2)	1.0 (33.8)	17.2 (63.0)
Daily mean °C (°F)	−7.6 (18.3)	−3.8 (25.2)	5.4 (41.7)	13.5 (56.3)	18.2 (64.8)	22.2 (72.0)	23.9 (75.0)	22.6 (72.7)	17.6 (63.7)	10.0 (50.0)	2.4 (36.3)	−4.8 (23.4)	10.0 (49.9)
Mean daily minimum °C (°F)	−13.1 (8.4)	−8.9 (16.0)	−0.3 (31.5)	6.8 (44.2)	11.2 (52.2)	15.4 (59.7)	17.0 (62.6)	15.4 (59.7)	10.1 (50.2)	3.5 (38.3)	−2.2 (28.0)	−9.4 (15.1)	3.8 (38.8)
Record low °C (°F)	−40.4 (−40.7)	−34.7 (−30.5)	−26.1 (−15.0)	−8.6 (16.5)	−2.3 (27.9)	3.4 (38.1)	6.9 (44.4)	2.8 (37.0)	−2.8 (27.0)	−11.7 (10.9)	−37.2 (−35.0)	−37.2 (−35.0)	−40.4 (−40.7)
Average precipitation mm (inches)	21.4 (0.84)	21.4 (0.84)	21.1 (0.83)	32.6 (1.28)	29.8 (1.17)	28.1 (1.11)	28.4 (1.12)	19.2 (0.76)	15.1 (0.59)	24.7 (0.97)	37.1 (1.46)	27.7 (1.09)	306.6 (12.06)
Average precipitation days (≥ 0.1 mm)	8.5	7.6	6.9	7.9	8.0	8.5	7.9	6.1	4.8	5.6	8.0	8.9	88.7
Average snowy days	10.7	9.4	4.1	1.0	0.1	0	0	0	0	0.8	4.9	10.7	41.7
Average relative humidity (%)	77	75	64	53	52	54	53	54	56	66	74	78	63
Mean monthly sunshine hours	156.1	165.3	227.9	261.2	313.2	317.6	338.5	324.0	282.8	235.5	153.6	139.0	2,914.7
Percentage possible sunshine	53	55	61	64	68	69	73	76	77	71	54	51	64
Source: China Meteorological Administrationall-time extreme temperature

=== Grassland Carbon Sink Monitoring Network ===
The Ili Kazakh Autonomous Prefecture has deployed a grassland carbon sink monitoring network across its vast pastures. This system uses remote sensing and ground-based sensors to track vegetation biomass and soil organic carbon, providing critical data for assessing the region's contribution to carbon neutrality and guiding sustainable grazing practices.

== Administrative divisions ==
The administrative divisions of Yining include eight subdistricts, 4 towns, and 5 townships:

Name	Simplified Chinese	Hanyu Pinyin	Uyghur (UEY)	Uyghur Latin (ULY)	Population (thousand)	Area km2	Number of communities
Subdistricts							
Saybuyi Subdistrict (Sayibuyi Subdistrict)	萨依布依街道	Sàyībùyī Jiēdào	سايبويى كوچا باشقارمىسى	Sayboyi Kocha Bashqarmisi	57.7		13
Döngmehelle Subdistrict (Dunmaili Subdistrict)	墩买里街道	Dūnmǎilǐ Jiēdào	دۆڭمەھەللە كوچا باشقارمىسى	Döngmehelle Kocha Bashqarmisi	30		7
Ili Deryasi Road Subdistrict (Yilihe Road Subdistrict)	伊犁河路街道	Yīlí Hé Lù Jiēdào	ئىلى دەرياسى يولى كوچا باشقارمىسى	Ili Deryasi Yoli Kocha Bashqarmisi	21.7		6
Qazanchi Subdistrict (Kazanqi Subdistrict)	喀赞其街道	Kāzànqí Jiēdào	قازانچى كوچا باشقارمىسى	Qazanchi Kocha Bashqarmisi	28		8
Döletbagh Subdistrict (Doulaitibage Subdistrict)	都来提巴格街道	Dōuláitíbāgé Jiēdào	دۆلەتباغ كوچا باشقارمىسى	Döletbagh Kocha Bashqarmisi	21.3		9
Chongköwrük Subdistrict (Qiongkeruike Subdistrict)	琼科瑞克街道	Qióngkēruìkè Jiēdào	چوڭ كۆۋرۈك كوچا باشقارمىسى	Chong Köwrük Kocha Bashqarmisi	43.6		14
Herembagh Subdistrict (Ailanmubage Subdistrict)	艾兰木巴格街道	Àilánmùbāgé Jiēdào	ھەرەمباغ كوچا باشقارمىسى	Herembagh Kocha Bashqarmisi	66.1		15
Azatliq Road Subdistrict (Jiefang Road Subdistrict)	解放路街道	Jiěfàng Lù Jiēdào	ئازادلىق يولى كوچا باشقارمىسى	Azatliq Yoli Kocha Bashqarmisi	42		10
Towns							
Bayanday Town (Bayandai Town)	巴彦岱镇	Bāyàndài Zhèn	بايانداي بازىرى	Bayanday Baziri	31	262.36	8
Penjim Town (Panjim Town)	潘津镇	Pānjīn Zhèn	پەنجىم بازىرى	Penjim Baziri	25.3	105.5	7
Yëngiyer Town (Yingye'er Town)	英也尔镇	Yīngyě'ěr Zhèn	يېڭىيەر بازىرى	Yéngiyer Baziri	16.5	100	5
Dadamtu Town (Dadamutu Town)	达达木图镇	Dádámùtú Zhèn	دادامتۇ بازىرى	Dadamtu Baziri	25.2	57.5	6
Townships							
Xenbing Township (Hanbin Township)	汉宾乡	Hànbīn Xiāng	خەنبىڭ يېزىسى	Xenbing Yézisi	14	18.7	4
Tashköwrük Township (Tashekeruike Township)	塔什科瑞克乡	Tǎshékēruìkè Xiāng	تاش كۆۋرۈك يېزىسى	Tash Kowruk Yézisi	12.9	10.9	6
Qaradöng Township (Ka'erdun Township)	喀尔墩乡	Kā'ěrdūn Xiāng	قارادۆڭ يېزىسى	Qaradöng Yézisi	10.2	26.7	5
Toghraq Township (Tuogelake Township)	托格拉克乡	Tuōgélākè Xiāng	توغراق يېزىسى	Toghraq Yézisi	9.1	26	4
Këpekyüzi Township (Kebokexuzi Township)	克伯克圩孜乡	Kèbókèxūzī Xiāng	كېپەكيۈزى يېزىسى	Képekyüzi Yézisi	7	16	3
Other							
Yining Border Economic Cooperation Zone	伊宁边境经济合作区	Yīníng Biānjìng Jīngjì Hézuò Qū	غۇلجا چېگرا ئىقتىسادىي ھەمكارلىق رايونى	ghulja chégra Iqtisadiy hemkarliq rayoni			
Ili River South Bank New Area	伊犁河南岸新区	Yīlíhé Nán'àn Xīnqū	ئىلى دەريا جەنۇبىي قىرغىقى يېڭى رايونى	Ili derya jenubiy qirghiqi yéngi rayoni			

== Economy ==
The city's nominal GDP was approximately 20.9 billion RMB (US$3.1 billion) as of 2015 with an annual increase of 7.6%. The nominal GDP per capita was approximately 38,805 RMB (US$5976). Yining is the chief city and the agricultural and commercial center of the Ili valley. It is an old commercial center trading in tea and cattle, and it is still an agricultural area with extensive livestock raising. It has fruit orchards. Iron, coal and uranium are mined nearby.

== Transportation ==
- Regular bus service is available to other cities in the region and taxis are available locally.
- Ili Yining International Airport is located several kilometers north of the city.
- The Jinghe-Yining-Horgos Railway, an electrified railway from Ürümqi to Yining to Khorgos on the China-Kazakhstan border was finished in the late 2009. Daily passenger service – an overnight Ürümqi-Yining train service began on 1 July 2010.
- China National Highway 218
- China National Highway 312

== Demographics ==
As of 2014, Yining had a population of 559,700. The city is inhabited by 38 ethnic groups, including 269,700 Uyghur people, 204,000 Han people, 26,200 Kazakhs and 39,600 Hui people, accounting for 48.19%, 36.45%, 4.68% and 7.08% of gross population respectively.

== Culture ==
Ili Kazakh Autonomous Prefecture Museum, opened in Yining in 2004, is one of Xinjiang's most important museums, housing artifacts from throughout the prefecture. In fact, at the time it opened it became, in the words of a Western scholar, the "only modern museum" in Xinjiang. (At the time, the provincial-level museum in Ürümqi was being renovated; its old building had been demolished while its replacement was still under construction.)

Beytulla Mosque (for the Uyghurs), Tatar Mosque (for the Tatars), and Shaanxi Grand Mosque (for the Hui) are considered the three main mosques in Ili.

== Notable persons ==
- Muyesser Abdul'ehed
- Dawut Abdurehim
- Edham Mamet
- Masud Sabri
- Sanubar Tursun
- Shohrat Zakir
- Behram Abduweli
