= Yining County =

Yining County 伊宁县 (Chinese) قۇلجا اۋدانى (Kazakh) غۇلجا ناھىيىسى (Uyghur) Gulja County
- County
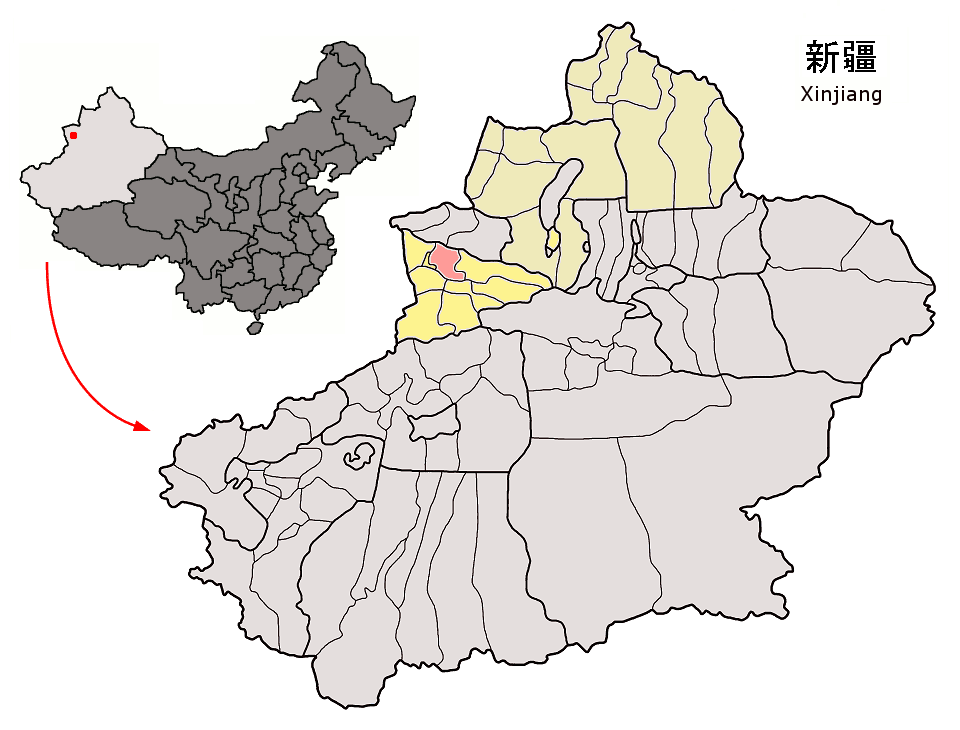
- Yining County (red) within Ili Prefecture (yellow) and Xinjiang

- Location in Xinjiang Yining County (Xinjiang) Yining County (China)
- Coordinates: 43°58′38″N 81°31′39″E
- Country: China
- Autonomous region: Xinjiang
- Autonomous prefecture: Ili
- County seat: Jëlilyüzi

Area
  - Total: 4,097 km^{2} (1,582 sq mi)

Population (2020)
  - Total: 365,307
  - Density: 89.16/km^{2} (230.9/sq mi)
- Time zone: UTC+8 (China Standard (Note: Locals in Xinjiang frequently observe UTC+6 (Xinjiang Time), 2 hours behind Beijing.))
- Website: www.xjyn.gov.cn

Yining County

Chinese name
- Simplified Chinese: 伊宁县
- Traditional Chinese: 伊寧縣
Transcriptions
Standard Mandarin
- Hanyu Pinyin: Yīníng Xiàn

Alternative Chinese name
- Simplified Chinese: 固勒扎县
- Traditional Chinese: 固勒扎縣
Transcriptions
Standard Mandarin
- Hanyu Pinyin: Gùlēizhā Xiàn

Uyghur name
- Uyghur: غۇلجا ناھىيىسى
Transcriptions
- Latin Yëziqi: Ghulja Nahiyisi
- Yengi Yeziⱪ: Ƣulja Naⱨiyisi
- SASM/GNC: Gulja Nahiyisi
- Siril Yëziqi: Ғулҗа Наһийиси

Yining County (Chinese: 伊宁县), also transliterated from Uyghur as Ghulja County (Uyghur: غۇلجا ناھىيىسى; Chinese: 固勒扎县), is a county of the Ili Kazakh Autonomous Prefecture in the Xinjiang Uyghur Autonomous Region of China. The county seat is in the town of Jëlilyüzi. Yining County does not include the adjacent city of Yining, which is a county-level administrative unit in its own right.

The county land area is 4486 km^{2}, with a population of 360,000 people as of 2004. A larger area (around 4580 km^{2}) and a population of 400,000 was reported for the county in 2000; this decrease and the corresponding increase of area and population for the city of Yining resulted from the transfer of the villages of Dadamtu (Uyghur: دادامتۇ, Дадамту; 达达木图; Dádámùtú) and Penjim (Uyghur: پەنجىم, Пәнҗим; 潘津; Pānjīn), with 100.45 km^{2} (38.78 sq mi) of land, from the county to the city in 2004.

== Administrative divisions ==
Yining County is divided into eight towns, nine townships, and one ethnic township.

Name	Simplified Chinese	Hanyu Pinyin	Uyghur (UEY)	Uyghur Latin (ULY)	Administrative division code
Towns
Jëlilyüzi Town	吉里于孜镇	Jílǐyúzī Zhèn	جېلىليۈزى بازىرى	jëlilyüzi baziri	654021100
Döngmazar Town	墩麻扎镇	Dūnmázhā Zhèn	دۆڭمازار بازىرى	döngmazar baziri	654021101
Yëngitam Town	英塔木镇	Yīngtǎmù Zhèn	يېڭىتام بازىرى	yëngitam baziri	654021102
Xudiyaryuzi Town	胡地于孜镇	Húdìyúzī Zhèn	خۇدىياريۈزى بازىرى	xudiyaryüzi baziri	654021103
Baytoqay Town	巴依托海镇	Bāyītuōhǎi Zhèn	بايتوقاي بازىرى	baytoqay baziri	654021104
Ara'östeng Town	阿热吾斯塘镇	Ārèwúsītáng Zhèn	ئارائۆستەڭ بازىرى	Ara'östeng baziri	654021105
Samyüzi Town	萨木于孜镇	Sàmùyúzī Zhèn	سامىيۈزى بازىرى	samiyüzi baziri	654021106
Qash Town	喀什镇	Kāshí Zhèn	قاش بازىرى	qash baziri	654021107
Uyghur Uchon Town	维吾尔玉其温镇	Wéiwú'ěryùqíwēn Zhèn	ئۇيغۇر ئۈچئون بازىرى	Uyghur Üch'on baziri	654021108
Onyar Town	温亚尔镇	Wēnyà'ěr Zhèn	ئونيار بازىرى	Onyar baziri	654021109
Townships
Turpanyüzi Township	吐鲁番于孜乡	Tǔlǔfānyúzī Xiāng	تۇرپانيۈزى يېزىسى	turpanyüzi yëzisi	654021201
Qarayaghach Township	喀拉亚尕奇乡	Kālāyàgǎqí Xiāng	قاراياغاچ يېزىسى	qarayaghach yëzisi	654021202
Ugung Township	武功乡	Wǔgōng Xiāng	ئۇگۇڭ يېزىسى	Ugung yëzisi	654021203
Sadiqyüzi Township	萨地克于孜乡	Sàdìkèyúzī Xiāng	سادىقيۈزى يېزىسى	sadiqyüzi yëzisi	654021204
Mazar Township	麻扎乡	Mázhā Xiāng	مازار يېزىسى	mazar yëzisi	654021212
Ewliya Township	阿乌利亚乡	Āwūlìyǎ Xiāng	ئەۋلىيا يېزىسى	Ewliya yëzisi	654021214
Chuluqay Township	曲鲁海乡	Qūlǔhǎi Xiāng	چۇلۇقاي يېزىسى	chuluqay yëzisi	654021215
Ethnic township
Uchon Hui Ethnic Township	愉群翁回族乡	Yúqúnwēng Huízú Xiāng	ئۈچئون خۇيزۇ يېزىسى	Üch'ün xuyzu yëzisi	654021201

Other: Central Farm of 70th Regiment (兵团七十团中心团场)

== Climate ==
Climate data for Yining County, elevation 770 m (2,530 ft), (1991–2020 normals, extremes 1991–present)
Month	Jan	Feb	Mar	Apr	May	Jun	Jul	Aug	Sep	Oct	Nov	Dec	Year
Record high °C (°F)	12.2 (54.0)	17.2 (63.0)	27.4 (81.3)	33.7 (92.7)	35.6 (96.1)	35.4 (95.7)	38.5 (101.3)	37.2 (99.0)	35.6 (96.1)	31.1 (88.0)	24.9 (76.8)	14.9 (58.8)	38.5 (101.3)
Mean daily maximum °C (°F)	−0.7 (30.7)	2.2 (36.0)	11.3 (52.3)	20.4 (68.7)	24.9 (76.8)	28.6 (83.5)	30.6 (87.1)	29.9 (85.8)	25.6 (78.1)	18.1 (64.6)	8.8 (47.8)	1.5 (34.7)	16.8 (62.2)
Daily mean °C (°F)	−6.0 (21.2)	−3.0 (26.6)	5.3 (41.5)	13.3 (55.9)	17.9 (64.2)	21.7 (71.1)	23.5 (74.3)	22.5 (72.5)	17.9 (64.2)	10.6 (51.1)	3.0 (37.4)	−3.5 (25.7)	10.3 (50.5)
Mean daily minimum °C (°F)	−10.2 (13.6)	−7.2 (19.0)	0.3 (32.5)	7.3 (45.1)	11.5 (52.7)	15.3 (59.5)	16.9 (62.4)	15.6 (60.1)	11.0 (51.8)	4.9 (40.8)	−1.0 (30.2)	−7.4 (18.7)	4.8 (40.5)
Record low °C (°F)	−26.9 (−16.4)	−24.3 (−11.7)	−18.6 (−1.5)	−8.5 (16.7)	−1.4 (29.5)	5.9 (42.6)	9.1 (48.4)	3.3 (37.9)	−2.2 (28.0)	−8.1 (17.4)	−18.5 (−1.3)	−24.1 (−11.4)	−26.9 (−16.4)
Average precipitation mm (inches)	26.1 (1.03)	25.9 (1.02)	27.0 (1.06)	42.3 (1.67)	35.8 (1.41)	31.1 (1.22)	29.5 (1.16)	24.7 (0.97)	17.0 (0.67)	30.9 (1.22)	43.2 (1.70)	34.0 (1.34)	367.5 (14.47)
Average precipitation days (≥ 0.1 mm)	8.1	7.9	7.9	8.9	8.8	9.6	8.4	6.6	5.0	6.1	8.1	9.0	94.4
Average snowy days	9.8	9.4	4.7	1.3	0.2	0	0	0	0	1.3	5.7	10.5	42.9
Average relative humidity (%)	71	71	62	52	52	54	54	52	51	60	70	73	60
Mean monthly sunshine hours	147.4	159.3	212.2	242.5	292.3	300.0	319.5	304.5	265.9	220.4	144.9	131.8	2,740.7
Percentage possible sunshine	50	53	56	59	64	65	69	72	73	66	51	48	61
Source: China Meteorological Administration

== History ==
The territories were inhabited by Turkic tribes from early history. The name Kuldga was first mentioned at the period of Turkic Khanate. When the Uyghur tribes, led by Pen Tekin, left to the west, part of the Yaglakar tribe, which was part of the Uyghur tribal union, left with them.

Chagatai Khan, the son of Genghis Khan, placed the capital of his possessions here. These lands were ruled by the Dzungar until they were conquered in the middle of the 18th century by the Qing during the so-called third Oirat-Manchu war. For a long time, Gulja was the de facto administrative and military capital of Qing Xinjiang (literally "New Frontiers"). The county was created in 1888 and was originally known as Ningyuan (宁远; 寧遠; Níngyuǎn) County. It received its present name in 1914.

In 1952, the city of Yining was separated from Yining County into a separate county-level administrative unit.
