= Xinjiang Uygur Autonomous Regional Committee of the Chinese Communist Party =

Xinjiang Uygur Autonomous Regional Committee of the Chinese Communist Party 中国共产党新疆维吾尔自治区委员会 جۇڭگو كوممۇنىستىك پارتىيەسى شىنجاڭ ئۇيغۇر ئاپتونوم رايونلۇق كومىتېتى

Overview
- Type: Highest decision-making organ when Xinjiang Uygur Autonomous Regional Congress is not in session.
- Elected by: Xinjiang Uygur Autonomous Regional Congress
- Length of term: Five years
- Term limits: None
- First convocation: November 1949
- Secretary: Chen Xiaojiang
- Deputy Secretary: Erkin Tuniyaz (Government Chairman); Li Yifei (XPCC Political Commissar); He Zhongyou (Party Secretary of Ürümqi); Zhang Zhu (Xinjiang Organization Department Director)
- Secretary-General: Qadan Käbenuly
- Executive organ: Standing Committee
- Inspection organ: Commission for Discipline Inspection

Website
- www.xjkunlun.cn

Xinjiang Uygur Autonomous Regional Committee of the Chinese Communist Party
- Simplified Chinese: 中国共产党新疆维吾尔自治区委员会
- Traditional Chinese: 中國共產黨新疆維吾爾自治區委員會
Transcriptions
Standard Mandarin
- Hanyu Pinyin: Zhōngguó Gòngchǎndǎng Xīnjiāng Wéiwú'ěr Zìzhìqū Wěiyuánhuì

Abbreviation
- Simplified Chinese: 中共新疆维吾尔自治区委
- Traditional Chinese: 中共新疆維吾爾自治區委
- Literal meaning: CCP Xinjiang Uygur Autonomous Regional Committee
Transcriptions
Standard Mandarin
- Hanyu Pinyin: Zhōnggòng Xīnjiāng Wéiwú'ěr Zìzhìqū Wěi

The Xinjiang Uygur Autonomous Regional Committee of the Chinese Communist Party is the regional committee of the Chinese Communist Party (CCP) in the Xinjiang Uygur Autonomous Region. The CCP committee secretary is the highest ranking post in the region, and also ex officio leads the Xinjiang Production and Construction Corps (XPCC). The current secretary is Ma Xingrui, a member of the CCP Politburo, who succeeded Chen Quanguo on 25 December 2021.

== History ==
In November 1949, during the incorporation of Xinjiang into the People's Republic of China at the end of the Chinese Civil War, the CCP Central Committee approved the establishment of the Xinjiang Branch of the CCP Central Committee. After Xinjiang Province was reorganised as the Xinjiang Uygur Autonomous Region in 1955, the Party Central Committee Xinjiang Branch was abolished and replaced with the Xinjiang Uygur Regional Committee of the CCP.

== Organization ==
The organization of the CCP XUAR Committee includes:

- General Office

=== Functional Departments ===
- Organization Department
- Publicity Department
- United Front Work Department
- Political and Legal Affairs Commission

=== Offices ===
- Policy Research Office
- Office of the National Security Commission
- Office of the Cyberspace Affairs Commission
- Office of the Institutional Organization Commission
- Office of the Military-civilian Fusion Development Committee
- Taiwan Work Office
- Office of the Leading Group for Inspection Work
- Bureau of Veteran Cadres

=== Dispatched institutions ===
- Working Committee of the Organs Directly Affiliated to the Xinjiang Uygur Autonomous Regional Committee
- Ürümqi Municipality and Changji Prefecture Committee of the Chinese Communist Party

=== Organizations directly under the Committee ===
- Xinjiang Party School
- Xinjiang Daily
- Xinjiang Institute of Socialism
- Party History Research Office
- Xinjiang Regional Archives

== Leadership ==
The Regional Committee Secretary is the highest-ranking official in Xinjiang. The Regional Committee Secretary is ex officio the first-ranking political commissar of the Xinjiang Production and Construction Corps. The Chairman of the XUAR People's Government usually serves as the CCP Deputy Committee Secretary. Since at least 2007, the secretary has consistently been a member of the CCP Politburo.

=== Party Committees ===
Secretary of the Xinjiang Branch of the Chinese Communist Party Central Committee

- Wang Zhen (1949–1950)

First Secretary of the Xinjiang Branch of the Chinese Communist Party Central Committee

- Wang Zhen (1950–1952)
- Wang Enmao (1952–1955)

Early Xinjiang Autonomous Region Party Committee (September 1955 – 1956)

- First Secretary: Wang Enmao
- Second Secretary: Xu Liqing
- Third Secretary: Saifuddin Azizi
- First Deputy Secretary: Gao Jinchun
- Second Deputy Secretary: Wu Kaizhang
- Members (22 in total): Wang Enmao, Xu Liqing, Saifuddin Azizi (Uyghur), Gao Jinchun, Wu Kaizhang, Burhan Shahidi (Uyghur), Zhao Shougong, Lü Jianren, Xin Lanting, Yang Heting

First Xinjiang Autonomous Region Party Committee (1956)

- First Secretary: Wang Enmao
- Secretaries: Saifuddin Azizi, Wu Kaizhang, Lü Jianren, Zeng Di, Saidulla Saifullayev
- Members (35 in total, including 12 ethnic minority members; 13 standing committee members)
- Standing Committee Members: Wang Enmao, Saifuddin Azizi (Uyghur), Wu Kaizhang, Lü Jianren, Zeng Di, Saidulla Saifullayev (Uyghur), Burhan Shahidi (Uyghur), Xin Lanting, Mamatming Iminov (Uyghur), Yang Heting, Qi Guo, Lin Bomin, Aishaiti Iskhakov (Tatar)
- Members: Li Quan, Yang Ke, Zhang Zhonghan, Zhang Shigong, Patihan Sugurbayev (Kazakh), Zhang Xiqin, Abdurahman Muyiti (Uyghur), Ren Gebai, Tu Zhi, Bai Chengming, Zuo Qi, Anwar Khan Baba (Uzbek), Seyit Yasinov (Uyghur), Shi Zizhen, Yu Zhanlin (Hui), Cheng Yuechang, Shu Mutong (Xibe), Tian Zhong, Guo Peng, Anwar Jakulin (Kazakh), Shi Jinhe, Zhang Fengqi
- Alternate Members (13 in total, including 7 ethnic minority members): Amantur Bayzak (Kyrgyz), Liu Fensheng, Fu Wen, Nur Mohammad Shadinov (Uyghur), Wang Jilong; Abuliz Mukhamet (Uyghur), Jakhda Babarykov (Kazakh), Wu Jianqun, Li Yunhe, Lü Ming (female), Abulimiti Hajiyev (Uyghur), Dashab Minzhuliyov (Mongol), Abdurim Aisha (Uyghur)

First Secretary of the Xinjiang Uyghur Autonomous Region Party Committee

- Wang Enmao (1955–1966)

Head of the Core Group of the Xinjiang Uyghur Autonomous Region Revolutionary Committee

- Long Shujin (1970–1971)

First Secretary of the Xinjiang Uyghur Autonomous Region Party Committee

- Long Shujin (1971–1972)
- Saifuddin Azizi (acting, 1972–1973)
- Saifuddin Azizi (1973–1978)
- Wang Feng (1978–1981)
- Wang Enmao (1981–1985)

Party Secretaries of the Xinjiang Uyghur Autonomous Region Party Committee before the Eighth Congress

- Song Hanliang (October 1985 – September 1994)
- Wang Lequan (24 September 1994 – 24 April 2010; acting September 1994 – September 1995)
- Zhang Chunxian (24 April 2010 – 29 August 2016)
- Chen Quanguo (29 August 2016 – 25 December 2021)

Eighth Xinjiang Autonomous Region Party Committee (October 2011 – November 2016)

- Secretary: Zhang Chunxian (– August 2016), Chen Quanguo (from August 2016)
- Deputy Secretaries: Nur Bekri (Uyghur, – December 2014), Che Jun (– June 2016), Han Yong (– January 2016), Shohrat Zakir (Uyghur, from December 2014), Sun Jinlong (from February 2016), Zhu Hailun (from March 2016), Li Pengxin (from September 2016)
- Standing Committee Members: Zhang Chunxian (– August 2016), Nur Bekri (Uyghur, – December 2014), Che Jun (– June 2016), Han Yong (– January 2016), Peng Yong (– November 2013), Huang Wei (– September 2016), Xiao Kaiti Yiming (Uyghur), Nurlan Abdumanjin (Kazakh, – January 2013), Song Airong (female, – April 2015), Zhu Hailun, Bai Zhijie (– January 2016), Kuresh Mahsut (Uyghur, – March 2014), Erkinjan Turahon (Uyghur), Hu Wei (– June 2013), Xiong Xuanguo (– October 2016), Hanibati Shabukai (Kazakh, from January 2013), Li Xuejun (from June 2013), Liu Lei (November 2013 – December 2014), Erkin Tuniyaz (Uyghur, from June 2014), Shohrat Zakir (Uyghur, from December 2014), Ma Xuejun (from April 2015), Xu Hairong (from April 2015), Li Wei (from July 2015), Sun Jinlong (from February 2016), Peng Jiarui (from March 2016), Chen Quanguo (from August 2016), Li Pengxin (from September 2016)

9th Regional Party Committee (November 2016–October 2021)

- Secretary: Chen Quanguo
- Deputy Secretaries: Shohrat Zakir (until September 2021), Sun Jinlong (until April 2020), Zhu Hailun (until January 2019), Li Pengxin (until February 2021), Wang Junzheng (April 2020–October 2021), Zhang Chunlin (from April 2021), Li Yifei (from July 2021), Erkin Tuniyaz (from September 2021), He Zhongyou (from October 2021)
- Other Standing Committee members: Shewket Imin (until January 2018), Erkinjan Turaxun (until March 2017), Xu Hairong (until October 2021), Li Xuejun (April 2018), Erkin Tuniyaz, Ma Xuejun (until July 2018), Peng Jiarui (until March 2017) Tian Wen, Aqanulı Sarqıt, Luo Dongchuan (May 2017–July 2018), Li Wei (January 2018–December 2020), Zhang Chunlin (from January 2018), Yang Xin (August 2018–May 2021), Ji Zheng (September 2018–December 2019), Wang Junzheng (February 2019–October 2021), Li Yifei (from May 2020), Wang Mingshan (from September 2020), Tian Xiangli (from May 2021), Chen Weijun (from May 2021), Yang Cheng (from June 2021), Zhang Zhu (from September 2021), He Zhongyou (from October 2021), Ilzat Exmetjan (from October 2021)

10th Regional Party Committee (October 2021–)

- Secretary: Chen Quanguo (until 25 December 2021), Ma Xingrui (from 25 December 2021)
- Deputy Secretaries: Erkin Tuniyaz, Li Yifei, Zhang Chunlin (until November 2023), He Zhongyou, Zhang Zhu (from December 2023)
- Other Standing Committee members: Yang Cheng, Tian Xiangli, Chen Weijun, Wang Mingshan (until February 2024), Zumret Obul (until January 2023), Yang Fasen (until May 2023), Yüsüpjan Memet, Ilzat Exmetjan, Qadan Käbenuly, Wang Jianxin (from December 2022), Chen Mingguo (from February 2024)

== See also ==
- Xinjiang Production and Construction Corps Committee of Chinese Communist Party
