= Diyar Kurmashuly =

Chinese politician

Dıar Qūrmaşūly
- Дияр Құрмаш

Vice Chairman of the Xinjiang Regional Committee of the Chinese People's Political Consultative Conference
- In office 1988–1998
- Chairman: Ba Dai; Janabil

Governor of Ili Kazakh Autonomous Prefecture
- In office 1983–1988
- Party Secretary: Lü Qianxun
- Preceded by: Qasymbek Seiіtjanūly
- Succeeded by: Ashat Kerimbay

Personal details
- Born: 1933 (age 92–93) Ürümqi, Xinjiang, Republic of China
- Party: Chinese Communist Party
- Education: Xinjiang No. 2 Normal School; Central Party School of the Chinese Communist Party

Chinese name
- Simplified Chinese: 迪牙尔·库马什
- Traditional Chinese: 迪牙爾·庫馬什
Transcriptions
Standard Mandarin
- Hanyu Pinyin: Díyáěr Kùmǎshí

Dıar Qūrmaşūly (Kazakh: Дияр Құрмаш; born 1933) is a Chinese politician of Kazakh ethnicity who served as vice chairman of the Xinjiang Regional Committee of the Chinese People's Political Consultative Conference from 1988 to 1998, and governor of Ili Kazakh Autonomous Prefecture from 1983 to 1988.

== Biography ==
Dıar Qūrmaşūly was born in Ürümqi, Xinjiang, in 1933 and graduated from Xinjiang No. 2 Normal School. He joined the Communist Youth League of China in 1950 and joined the Chinese Communist Party (CCP) in 1954.

Dıar Qūrmaşūly was recognized by the state leaders for dealing with the emigration of border residents in 1962. One year later, he was admitted to the Central Party School of the Chinese Communist Party. During the Cultural Revolution, he was brought to be persecuted and sent to the May Seventh Cadre Schools to do farm works. He was reinstated in 1973 and worked in the Ürümqi Municipal People's Government. During his tenure, he solved the pasture disputes between Ürümqi County and surrounding counties. In 1975, he became deputy director of Organization Department of CCP Xinjiang Regional Committee. During his term in office, he successfully handled the problem of abolishing 7th Division of Xinjiang Production and Construction Corps. In 1980, he took office as secretary-general of Xinjiang Uygur Autonomous Regional People's Government. In 1983, he was made governor of Ili Kazakh Autonomous Prefecture, replacing Ashat Kerimbay. He became vice chairman of the Xinjiang Regional Committee of the Chinese People's Political Consultative Conference in 1988, and was re-elected in 1993.

He was a delegate to the 3rd and 6th National People's Congress.

Government offices
Preceded by Qasymbek Seiіtjanūly	Governor of Ili Kazakh Autonomous Prefecture; 1983–1988	Succeeded by Ashat Kerimbay
