= Su Beihai =

Chinese scholar (1915–1999)

Su Beihai (1915 - May 31, 1999, Chinese: 苏北海), real name Wang Rennan (Chinese: 王仁南), pen names Su Jiang (Chinese: 苏江), Xixin (Chinese: 锡新), Jiang Rongjiang (Chinese: 江戎疆), Jiang Xujiang (Chinese: 江戌疆), a native of Wuxi County, Jiangsu Province (present Wuxi, Jiangsu Province), was a scholar primarily engaged in the study of the history of the Kazakhs, Uyghurs, and other ethnic groups of northwest China and Central Asia. He graduated from the History Department of the Jiangsu Provincial Institute of Education in 1937, and later taught in Gansu and Xinjiang, where he served as a researcher in the Research Office of the Xinjiang Branch of the CCP Central Committee and as an editor of the Xinjiang People's Press. In his later years, he held the positions of associate professor and professor in the history department at Xinjiang University.

== Biography ==
Su Beihai was born in 1915, in Wuxi County, Jiangsu Province. In July 1937, Su Beihai completed his studies in the History Department at the Jiangsu Provincial Institute of Education. In the same year, he traveled to Gansu, where he taught at the Gansu Provincial Wuwei Normal School (Chinese: 甘肃省立武威师范学校) and other schools. Moreover, Su Beihai undertook social research in various villages and pastoral regions of Gansu during this time, including an examination of the social history of the Kazakhs who migrated to Gansu and Qinghai. After the start of the Second Sino-Japanese War, Su Beihai changed his name from Wang Rennan to Su Beihai in order to inspire himself with Su Wu and aspire to serve his country.

In 1945, Su Beihai traveled to Dihua (present-day Ürümqi), Xinjiang, to work in the police department of Sheng Shicai's secret archives. In 1946, he began working as a senior senator and director of the research office at the Third Branch of the Central Police School. After Zhang Zhizhong, who was in charge of Xinjiang, set up a special publicity committee, Su Beihai became the head of the Design Guidance Group of the Xinjiang Provincial Publicity Committee (Chinese: 新疆省宣传委员会设计指导组) and presided over the publicity and publication work in Xinjiang. In 1947, Su Beihai was employed by Xinjiang College (now Xinjiang University) as an associate professor in the Department of Literature and History. From 1947 to 1949, Su Beihai published more than 40 essays on topics such as the history and culture of the Uyghur people and the history and culture of the Kazakh people.

After the incorporation of Xinjiang into the People's Republic of China, Su Beihai worked as a researcher in the Research Office of the Xinjiang Branch of the CCP Central Committee (Chinese: 中共中央新疆分局), during which time he was involved in the publicity of campaigns such as surveys of agricultural and pastoral areas, rent reductions and counter-hegemony, and land reform campaigns, as well as completing works such as Climatic Studies of Xinjiang (unpublished manuscript), and publishing discourses such as The Origins of the Kazakh Ethnic Group. In 1952, he was transferred to the Xinjiang People's Press as an editor. In 1958, Su Beihai was arrested and imprisoned after the Anti-Rightist Movement affected him, and in the early 1960s, while in prison, Su Beihai completed his research on the Sino-Indian, Sino-Arabic, Sino-Soviet, and Sino-Mongolian borders, as well as The General History of the Western Regions (Unpublished Draft). Su Beihai was released from prison in 1976 (one says 1973). After his release, Su Beihai worked as a janitor at the South Gate Xinhua Bookstore in Ürümqi.

In 1979, Su Beihai was rehabilitated and went to teach in the history department of Xinjiang University. After going to Xinjiang University, Su Beihai focused on the history of the Kazakhs, especially the Kazakhs in China. In July 1983, Su Beihai went on an expedition to the Kazakh tribes and Mongolian tribes in the Altai Mountains, the Saur Mountains, the Tarbagatai Mountains, the Baluk Mountains, the Alatau Mountains, and the Tian Shan Mountains, and investigated a number of unrecorded seals and burials in the northern Xinjiang region, as well as discovering a large number of petroglyphs. In 1986, Su Beihai was promoted to professor. In 1992, Su Beihai traveled to Turpan Yanghai Tomb Group and other places to investigate. In 1998, Su Beihai traveled to Kazakhstan. On May 31, 1999, Su Beihai died in Ürümqi at the age of 84 due to illness.
