= Bekmukhamet Musauly =

Chinese politician

Bekmūkhamet Mūsaūly
- Бекмұхамет Мұсаұлы

Vice Chairman of the Xinjiang Regional Committee of the Chinese People's Political Consultative Conference
- In office January 1998 – June 2005
- Chairman: Janabil; Ashat Kerimbay

Governor of Ili Kazakh Autonomous Prefecture
- In office May 1993 – January 1998
- Party Secretary: Kang Kejian; Zhou Yuan
- Preceded by: Ashat Kerimbay
- Succeeded by: Alpısbaý Raxımulı

Personal details
- Born: December 1939 Tekes County, Xinjiang, Republic of China
- Died: 9 April 2017 (aged 77) Ürümqi, Xinjiang, People's Republic of China
- Party: Chinese Communist Party
- Education: Beijing Normal University

Chinese name
- Simplified Chinese: 别克木哈买提·木沙
- Traditional Chinese: 別克木哈買提·木沙
Transcriptions
Standard Mandarin
- Hanyu Pinyin: Biékèmùhāmǎití Mùshā

Bekmukhamet Musauly (Kazakh: Бекмұхамет Мұсаұлы; December 1939 – 9 April 2017) was a Chinese politician of Kazakh ethnicity who served vice chairman of the Xinjiang Regional Committee of the Chinese People's Political Consultative Conference from 1998 to 2005, and governor of Ili Kazakh Autonomous Prefecture from 1993 to 1998.

== Biography ==
Bekmukhamet Musauly was born in Tekes County, Xinjiang, in December 1939. He entered the workforce in August 1965, and joined the Chinese Communist Party (CCP) in April 1971. In 1960, he enrolled in Beijing Normal University, majoring in chemistry. In February 1967, he entered Yili Kazakh Autonomous Prefecture Industry and Transportation Bureau, where he eventually became deputy director in April 1974. In September 1975, he was appointed head and deputy party secretary of Kuytun, and served for three years. In December 1978, he became deputy director of the Chemical Department of Xinjiang Uygur Autonomous Region, rising to director in June 1987. In May 1993, he took office as governor of Ili Kazakh Autonomous Prefecture, succeeding Alpısbaý Raxımulı. In January 1998, he was made vice chairman of the Xinjiang Regional Committee of the Chinese People's Political Consultative Conference, serving in the post until his retirement in June 2005.

On 9 April 2017, he died of an illness in Ürümqi, aged 77.

Government offices
Preceded by Ashat Kerimbay	Governor of Ili Kazakh Autonomous Prefecture; 1993–1998	Succeeded by Alpısbaý Raxımulı
