= Jin Zhizhen =

Chinese former politician (born 1970)

- 金之镇

Vice Chairman of the Xinjiang Uygur Autonomous Regional Committee of the Chinese People's Political Consultative Conference
- In office January 2023 – November 2025
- Chairman: Nurlan Abilmazhinuly

Personal details
- Born: July 1970 (age 56) Zhenjiang, Jiangsu, China
- Party: Chinese Communist Party (expelled in 2026)
- Education: Dongbei University of Finance and Economics; Renmin University of China

Chinese name
- Simplified Chinese: 金之镇
- Traditional Chinese: 金之鎮
Transcriptions
Standard Mandarin
- Hanyu Pinyin: Jīn Zhīzhèn

Jin Zhizhen (Chinese: 金之镇; born July 1970) is a Chinese former politician and business executive of Hui ethnicity who spent his entire career in northwest China's Xinjiang Uygur Autonomous Region. He was investigated by China's top anti-corruption agency in November 2025. Previously he served as vice chairman of the Xinjiang Uygur Autonomous Regional Committee of the Chinese People's Political Consultative Conference. He is a delegate to the 14th National People's Congress.

== Early life and education ==
Jin was born in Zhenjiang, Jiangsu, in July 1970. He pursued higher education at Dongbei University of Finance and Economics, graduating in 1991 with a degree in national economic planning. He later earned a master's degree in economics from the Renmin University of China in 2000.

== Career ==
Jin joined the Chinese Communist Party (CCP) in June 1991 upon graduation. After university in August 1991, he began his political career in the planning system of the Xinjiang Uygur Autonomous Region, holding various positions within the Regional Planning Commission and its successor, the Regional Development and Reform Commission. His early posts included clerk and section member of the Technology Division, section member of the Business Division, deputy director and then director of the Marketing Division, deputy director of the Economic and Trade Circulation Division, deputy director of the Economic Information Center, and director of the Economic Research Institute. Between 2006 and 2008, he gained local governance experience as a standing committee member of the CCP Jimsar County Party Committee and later as the deputy director of the Changji Hui Autonomous Prefectual Development and Reform Commission, both on a secondment basis.

In December 2008, Jin became director of the Economic and Social Development Research Institute of the Xinjiang Uygur Autonomous Region Economic Research Institute, but having held the position for only a year.

In December 2009, Jin shifted his career to the management of major state-owned enterprises, in which he served as deputy general manager of Xinjiang Chemical (Group) Corporation, and concurrently served as party secretary and chairman of Xinjiang Huaju Chemical Co., Ltd. since June 2011. He was assistant to the chairman of Xinjiang New Energy (Group) Co., Ltd. in June 2012, in addition to serving as party secretary, chairman, and general manager of Xinjiang Jinrun Lvyuan Technology Development Company three months later. He was deputy general manager of Xinjiang New Energy (Group) Co., Ltd. in June 2013 and subsequently in November 2014 party secretary and chairman of Xinjiang International Economic Cooperation (Group) Corporation Ltd., a position he held until 2016.

In July 2016, Jin returned to a government role as acting governor of Midong District in Urumqi, confirmed in August 2016. He also served as its deputy party secretary.

In January 2018, Jin's career took him to the Xinjiang Production and Construction Corps (XPCC), where he held several key positions concurrently: deputy secretary and deputy director of the XPCC State-owned Assets Supervision and Administration Commission (SASAC), deputy secretary of the CCP 6th Division of the Xinjiang Production and Construction Corps Committee, and deputy head of the 6th Division. He was also deputy party secretary of the Wujiaqu City between September 2018 and November 2018.

In November 2018, Jin was appointed deputy party secretary of the Changji Hui Autonomous Prefecture and was named acting governor, a role that was confirmed in January 2019.

He took up the post of vice chairman of the Xinjiang Uygur Autonomous Regional Committee of the Chinese People's Political Consultative Conference in January 2023, although he remained deputy party secretary and governor of the Changji Hui Autonomous Prefecture until March 2023. In December 2023, he took on additional responsibility as party secretary and deputy director of the Xinjiang Uygur Autonomous Regional People's Government State-owned Assets Supervision and Administration Commission.

== Downfall ==
On 1 November 2025, the Central Commission for Discipline Inspection (CCDI) and the National Supervisory Commission announced that Jin is under investigation for suspected "serious violations of discipline and law", a common euphemism for corruption. He was expelled from the party and dismissed from public office on 7 May 2026.

Government offices
Preceded by Zhang Chengyi	Governor of Changji Hui Autonomous Prefecture; 2019–2023	Succeeded by Zheng Min
