= Kasymbek Seyitzhanuly =

Chinese politician (1927–2008)

Qasımbek Seýitjanulı
- Қасымбек Сейітжанұлы

Governor of Ili Kazakh Autonomous Prefecture
- In office 1979–1983
- Preceded by: Janabil
- Succeeded by: Dıar Qūrmaşūly

Personal details
- Born: 1 August 1927 Emin County, Xinjiang, Republic of China
- Died: 1 August 2008 (aged 81) Yining, Xinjiang, People's Republic of China
- Party: Chinese Communist Party
- Education: Ürümqi Normal School

Chinese name
- Simplified Chinese: 哈生别克·赛依提江
- Traditional Chinese: 哈生別克·賽依提江
Transcriptions
Standard Mandarin
- Hanyu Pinyin: Hāshēngbiékè Sàiyītíjiōng

Kasymbek Seyitzhanuly (Kazakh: Қасымбек Сейітжанұлы, romanized: Qasımbek Seýitjanulı; 1 August 1927 – 1 August 2008) was a Chinese politician of Kazakh ethnicity who served as governor of Ili Kazakh Autonomous Prefecture from 1979 to 1983, and chairman of Ili Kazakh Autonomous Prefecture Committee of the Chinese People's Political Consultative Conference from 1983 to 1985.

== Biography ==
Kasymbek was born in Emin County, Xinjiang, on 1 August 1927. He entered the workforce in August 1945, and joined the Chinese Communist Party (CCP) in November 1950.

He taught at school for several years before becoming involved in politics in January 1950. He was Chinese Communist Party Deputy Committee Secretary of Wusu County in April 1956, concurrently holding the conference chairmen position since 1958. He served as deputy governor of Tacheng Prefecture in July 1960, and a year and a half later promoted to the governor position. During the Cultural Revolution, he was brought to be persecuted. He was reinstated as deputy CCP committee secretary of Tacheng Prefecture in April 1973 and two years later was assigned to the similar position in Ili Kazakh Autonomous Prefecture. In May 1978, he was made procurator-general of the People's Procuratorate of Xinjiang Uygur Autonomous Region, but having held the position for only 10 months, when he was reassigned to Ili Kazakh Autonomous Prefecture as governor. In May 1983, he was appointed deputy party secretary of Ili Kazakh Autonomous Prefecture, concurrently serving as conference chairmen. He retired in January 1994.

On 1 August 2008, he died from an illness in Yining, aged 81.

Government offices
Preceded by Janabil	Governor of Ili Kazakh Autonomous Prefecture; 1979–1983	Succeeded by Dıar Qūrmaşūly
