= Luo Zengbin =

Chinese politician

- 罗增斌

Communist Party Secretary of Haikou
- In office January 2022 – October 2024
- Preceded by: He Zhongyou
- Succeeded by: Fan Shaojun

Personal details
- Born: October 1967 (age 58–59) Cangxi County, Sichuan, China
- Party: Chinese Communist Party (1993–2025; expelled)
- Education: Sichuan Agricultural University; Sichuan University

Chinese name
- Simplified Chinese: 罗增斌
- Traditional Chinese: 羅增斌
Transcriptions
Standard Mandarin
- Hanyu Pinyin: Luó Zēngbīn

Luo Zengbin (Chinese: 罗增斌; born October 1967) is a former Chinese politician. As of October 2024 he was under investigation by China's top anti-graft watchdog. Previously he served as party secretary of Haikou and a member of the Standing Committee of the CCP Hainan Provincial Committee. He is the third party secretary of Haikou to be disgraced by China's top anti-corruption watchdog, after Zhang Qi and Wang Fuyu.

Luo was a representative of the 20th National Congress of the Chinese Communist Party.

== Early life and education ==
Luo was born in Cangxi County, Sichuan, in October 1967. In 1986, he enrolled at Sichuan Agricultural University, where he majored in forestry. He earned his Doctor of Science degree from Sichuan University in June 2009.

== Career ==
After university in 1990, Luo was assigned as an editor and journalist to Sichuan Forestry Newspaper.

Luo got involved in politics in February 1991, and joined the Chinese Communist Party (CCP) in June 1993. He began his academic political at the Sichuan Provincial Forestry Department, and 9 years later, ultimately being appointed department deputy director.

In September 2011, Luo was admitted to member of the CCP Guang'an Municipal Committee, the city's top authority, and appointed executive vice mayor in November of that same year. In February 2013, he was named acting mayor, confirmed in April 2013. In June 2017, he was transferred to the neighboring Bazhong city and appointed party secretary, the top political position in the city. In February 2021, he became party secretary of Mianyang, but having held the position for only eleven months. In September 2021, he became a member of the CCP Sichuan Provincial Committee, the province's top authority.

In January 2022, Luo was admitted to member of the CCP Hainan Provincial Committee, the province's top authority, and appointed party secretary of Haikou, capital of the province.

== Downfall ==
On 6 December 2024, Luo was put under investigation for alleged "serious violations of discipline and laws" by the Central Commission for Discipline Inspection (CCDI), the party's internal disciplinary body, and the National Supervisory Commission, the highest anti-corruption agency of China.

On 27 May 2025, Luo was stripped of his posts within the CCP and in the public office. On October 15, he was indicted on suspicion of accepting bribes.

On 28 February 2026, Luo was sentenced to death sentence with reprieve for bribery in 317 million yuan.

Government offices
Preceded by Hou Xiaochun	Mayor of Guang'an; 2013–2017	Succeeded by Zeng Qing
Party political offices
Preceded by Feng Jian	Communist Party Secretary of Bazhong; 2017–2021	Succeeded by He Ping
Preceded by Liu Chao	Communist Party Secretary of Mianyang; 2021–2022	Succeeded by Cao Lijun
Preceded by He Zhongyou	Communist Party Secretary of Haikou; 2002–2004	Succeeded by Fan Shaojun
