= Ba Dai =

Chinese writer and politician (1930–2022)

- 巴岱

Chairman of the Xinjiang Regional Committee of the Chinese People's Political Consultative Conference
- In office 1988–1993
- Preceded by: Ismail Yasinov
- Succeeded by: Janabil

Personal details
- Born: June 1930 Hejing County, Xinjiang, Republic of China
- Died: 26 March 2022 (age 92) Ürümqi, Xinjiang, China
- Party: Chinese Communist Party

Ba Dai (Chinese: 巴岱; pinyin: Bā Dài; June 1930 – 26 March 2022) was a Chinese politician of Mongol ethnicity who served as chairman of the Xinjiang Regional Committee of the Chinese People's Political Consultative Conference between 1988 and 1993.

He was a representative of the 13th National Congress of the Chinese Communist Party and 14th National Congress of the Chinese Communist Party. He was a delegate to the 3rd, 4th, 5th and 6th National People's Congress. He was a member of the 7th and 9th National Committee of the Chinese People's Political Consultative Conference and a member of the 8th Standing Committee of the Chinese People's Political Consultative Conference.

== Biography ==
Ba Dai was born in Hejing County, Xinjiang, in 1930, during the Republic of China. He joined the Chinese Communist Party on 1 July 1953. He worked as head of Organization Department of CPC Bayingolin Mongol Autonomous Prefecture Committee before being appointed governor of Bayingolin Mongol Autonomous Prefecture in 1963.

After the Cultural Revolution, in 1977, he was promoted to become vice chairman of Xinjiang Uygur Autonomous Region. He served as vice chairperson of the National People's Congress Ethnic Affairs Committee from 1983 to 1988. He was appointed secretary of Xinjiang Regional Political and Legal Affairs Commission in 1984 and admitted to member of the standing committee of the CPC Xinjiang Regional Committee, the region's top authority. He was chairman of the Xinjiang Regional Committee of the Chinese People's Political Consultative Conference in 1988, and held that office until 1993.

Assembly seats
Preceded by Ismail Yasinov	Chairman of the Xinjiang Regional Committee of the Chinese People's Political Consultative Conference; 1988–1993	Succeeded by Janabil
