= Ismail Yasinov =

Chinese politician

- ئىسمائىل ياسىنوف

Chairman of the Xinjiang Regional Committee of the Chinese People's Political Consultative Conference
- In office 1983–1988
- Preceded by: Zhang Shigong
- Succeeded by: Ba Dai

Personal details
- Born: November 1916 Manas County, Xinjiang, Republic of China
- Died: July 9, 2010 (aged 93) Ürümqi, Xinjiang, People's Republic of China
- Party: Chinese Communist Party
- Education: Samarkand Agricultural College

Chinese name
- Simplified Chinese: 司马益·牙生诺夫
- Traditional Chinese: 司馬義·牙生諾夫
Transcriptions
Standard Mandarin
- Hanyu Pinyin: Sīmǎyì Yáshēngnuòfū

Ismail Yasinov (Uyghur: ئىسمائىل ياسىنوف, romanized: Ismail Yasinof; November 1916 – 9 July 2010) was a Chinese agronomist and politician of Uyghur origin who served as chairman of the Xinjiang Regional Committee of the Chinese People's Political Consultative Conference between 1983 and 1988.

He was a delegateto the 2nd and 3rd National People's Congress and a member of the 5th National Committee of the Chinese People's Political Consultative Conference.

== Biography ==
Ismail Yasinov was born in Manas County, Xinjiang in November 1916, during the Republic of China. His mother died after giving birth to him, and then his father died. Ismail Yasinov and his two elder sisters were raised by his uncle in a township of Artux. In 1925, he attended Islamic Religious School. After graduating from Samarkand Agricultural College in 1941, he worked in the Construction Department of Xinjiang Provincial Government. Soon after, he worked as a technician and then engineer at Liudaowan Nursery Garden (六道湾苗圃) in Dihua (now Ürümqi). Ismail Yasinov joined the Chinese Communist Revolution in July 1947. He joined the Chinese Communist Party on 30 December 1949 under the introduction of Wang Zhen and Xu Liqing.

From December 1949 to February 1954, he worked in the Forestry Department of Xinjiang Provincial People's Government. On 1 October 1955, he was admitted to member of the standing committee of the Xinjiang Uygur Autonomous Regional Committee of the Chinese Communist Party, the region's top authority. He concurrently served as head of Rural Work Department and Forestry Department.

During the Cultural Revolution, he was protected by his colleagues from physical persecution. In 1971, he was sent to the May Seventh Cadre Schools to do farm works. In April 1973, he was assigned to the Cadre Sanatorium of Xinjiang Uygur Autonomous Region. In November of that same year, he was appointed deputy party secretary and president of Xinjiang Bayi Agricultural College (now Xinjiang Agricultural University).

In February 1978, he became vice chairman of the Xinjiang Regional Committee of the Chinese People's Political Consultative Conference, rising to chairman in 1983. He retired in December 1989.

On 9 July 2010, he died from an illness in Ürümqi, aged 93.

Assembly seats
Preceded by Zhang Shigong	Chairman of the Xinjiang Regional Committee of the Chinese People's Political Consultative Conference; 1983–1988	Succeeded by Ba Dai
