= Party Secretary of Xinjiang =

Regional government position in China

Secretary of the Xinjiang Uygur Autonomous Regional Committee of the Chinese Communist Party
- 中国共产党新疆维吾尔自治区委员会书记 جۇڭگو كوممۇنىستىك پارتىيەسى شىنجاڭ ئۇيغۇر ئاپتونوم رايونلۇق كومىتېتىنىڭ شۇجىسى
- Emblem of the Chinese Communist Party

- Flag of the Chinese Communist Party
- Incumbent; Chen Xiaojiang since 1 July 2025
- Xinjiang Uygur Autonomous Regional Committee of the Chinese Communist Party
- Type: Party Committee Secretary
- Status: Provincial and ministerial-level official
- Member of: Xinjiang Uygur Autonomous Regional Standing Committee
- Nominator: Central Committee
- Appointer: Xinjiang Uygur Autonomous Regional Committee Central Committee
- Inaugural holder: Wang Zhen
- Formation: 1949
- Deputy: Deputy Secretary; Secretary-General

The secretary of the Xinjiang Uygur Autonomous Regional Committee of the Chinese Communist Party is the leader of the Xinjiang Uygur Autonomous Regional Committee of the Chinese Communist Party (CCP). As the CCP is the sole ruling party of the People's Republic of China (PRC), the secretary is the highest ranking post in Xinjiang.

The secretary is officially appointed by the CCP Central Committee based on the recommendation of the CCP Organization Department, which is then approved by the Politburo and its Standing Committee. The secretary can be also appointed by a plenary meeting of the Xinjiang Regional Committee, but the candidate must be the same as the one approved by the central government. The secretary leads the Standing Committee of the Xinjiang Regional Committee, and since at least 2007, the secretary has consistently been a member of the CCP Politburo. The secretary leads the work of the Regional Committee and its Standing Committee and is ex officio the first-ranking political commissar of the Xinjiang Production and Construction Corps (XPCC). The secretary is outranks the chairman, who is generally the deputy secretary of the committee and is customarily an ethnic Uyghur. Except for Saifuddin Azizi, the secretary as always been an ethnic Han.

The current secretary is Chen Xiaojiang, who took office on 1 July 2025.

== List of party secretaries ==
No.	Image	Name	Term start	Term end	Ref.
1		Wang Zhen (王震) (1908–1993)	October 1949	June 1952	
2		Wang Enmao (王恩茂) (1913–2001)	June 1952	1967	
3		Long Shujin (龙书金) (1910–2003)	May 1971	July 1972	
4		Saifuddin Azizi (赛福鼎·艾则孜) (1915–2003)	July 1972	January 1978	
5		Wang Feng (汪锋) (1910–1998)	January 1978	October 1981	
6		Wang Enmao (王恩茂) (1913–2001)	October 1981	July 1985	
7		Song Hanliang (宋汉良) (1934–2000)	July 1985	24 September 1994	
8		Wang Lequan (王乐泉) (born 1944)	24 September 1994	24 April 2010	
9		Zhang Chunxian (张春贤) (born 1953)	24 April 2010	29 August 2016	
10		Chen Quanguo (陈全国) (born 1955)	29 August 2016	25 December 2021	
11		Ma Xingrui (马兴瑞) (born 1959)	25 December 2021	1 July 2025	
12		Chen Xiaojiang (陈小江) (born 1962)	1 July 2025	Incumbent	
