= Philip Baker (obstetrician) =

British obstetrician

Philip N. Baker is a British obstetrician, academic and university administrator whose research focuses on maternal and fetal health. He is Pro-Vice-Chancellor for Medicine and Health Sciences at the University of East Anglia, and has held senior academic and clinical appointments in the United Kingdom, Canada, New Zealand and China. He was elected a Fellow of the Academy of Medical Sciences in 2008.

== Early life and education ==
He received a Bachelor of Medical Sciences with honours in 1983 and a Bachelor of Medicine and Bachelor of Surgery (BM BS) in 1985 from University of Nottingham. He earned an MD from the university in 1991. He became member of the Royal College of Obstetricians and Gynaecologists (MRCOG) in 1990 and was elected a fellow of the college in 2003. He later became a fellow of the Royal College of Physicians and Surgeons of Canada and the Royal Australian and New Zealand College of Obstetricians and Gynaecologists.

== Career ==
Baker became Professor of Obstetrics and Gynaecology at the University of Nottingham in 1998 and held professorships in maternal and fetal health at the University of Manchester, the University of Alberta and the University of Auckland. At Manchester, he also served as Head of the Medical School and later as Director of the Manchester NIHR Biomedical Research Centre and Head of Research for Central Manchester and Manchester Children's University Hospitals NHS Trust.

From 2009 to 2011, Baker was Dean of the Faculty of Medicine and Dentistry at the University of Alberta. He held international academic and advisory positions in Canada and New Zealand, including Director of Gravida, New Zealand's National Research Centre for Growth and Development.

At the University of Leicester, Baker served as Head of the College of Life Sciences, Dean of Medicine and Pro-Vice-Chancellor from 2015 to 2021, and as Pro-Vice-Chancellor for Research and Enterprise and Professor of Maternal and Fetal Health from 2021 to 2025. He became Pro-Vice-Chancellor for Medicine and Health Sciences at the University of East Anglia in February 2025.

His other appointments have included Scientific Director of the International Pregnancy Research Alliance, National Distinguished Professor at Chongqing Medical University and Honorary Distinguished Professor at Kunming Medical University. Since 2024 he has chaired Health Innovation East Midlands.

== Research ==
Baker's research has focused on the mechanisms underlying maternal and fetal complications of pregnancy, particularly fetal growth restriction, pre-eclampsia and placental dysfunction. His work has examined the relationship between placental perfusion, vascular function and fetal growth, including studies of placental blood flow using magnetic resonance imaging and of potassium-channel expression in the placental vasculature of pregnancies complicated by fetal growth restriction.

A further area of his research has been placental function and nutrient transport. He has investigated how maternal characteristics, including age and nutritional status, affect placental nutrient transport and the risk of small-for-gestational-age birth. His research has also examined micronutrient status during adolescent pregnancy and its association with pregnancy outcomes.

Baker has published extensively on pre-eclampsia, including research into placental and vascular mechanisms, potential therapeutic targets, and biomarkers associated with the disorder. His work has included investigation of sildenafil, a phosphodiesterase-5 inhibitor, as a possible treatment for pre-eclampsia and severe early-onset fetal growth restriction.

He was also involved in the international STRIDER programme, which evaluated sildenafil for severe early-onset fetal growth restriction through multicentre randomised controlled trials. The UK trial found that sildenafil did not prolong pregnancy or improve pregnancy outcomes in this setting.

== Awards and honours ==
- Fellow of the Academy of Medical Sciences (2008)
- Fellow of the Royal College of Obstetricians and Gynaecologists (2003)
- Fellow of the Royal College of Physicians and Surgeons of Canada (2009)
- Fellow of the Royal Australian and New Zealand College of Obstetricians and Gynaecologists (2014)
- National Distinguished Professor, Chongqing Medical University
- Honorary Distinguished Professor, Kunming Medical University
