= Zhang Shigong =

Chinese politician

- 张世功

Chairman of the Xinjiang Regional Committee of the Chinese People's Political Consultative Conference
- In office 1980–1981
- Preceded by: Wang Feng
- Succeeded by: Ismail Yasinov

Personal details
- Born: 1906 Xin County, Henan, Qing China
- Died: 1992 (aged 85–86) Ürümqi, Xinjiang, China
- Party: Chinese Communist Party
- Education: Peng–Yang Military School; Central Party School of the Chinese Communist Party

Military service
- Allegiance: People's Republic of China
- Branch/service: Red Army; Eighth Route Army; People's Liberation Army Ground Force
- Years of service: 1931–1979
- Battles/wars: Second Sino-Japanese War; Chinese Civil War

Chinese name
- Simplified Chinese: 张世功
- Traditional Chinese: 張世功
Transcriptions
Standard Mandarin
- Hanyu Pinyin: Zhāng Shìgōng

Zhang Shigong (1906 – 23 September 1992) was a Chinese politician who served as chairman of the Xinjiang Regional Committee of the Chinese People's Political Consultative Conference between 1980 and 1981.

== Early life ==
Zhang was born into a family of farming background in Sidian Township of Xin County, Henan, in 1906, during the late Qing dynasty. He had five siblings. He participated in the peasant movement in the autumn of 1926. He joined the Chinese Communist Party in February 1931, and enlisted in the Red Army in April of that same year. Soon after, he was sent to study at Peng–Yang Military School. After graduation, he took part in the counter encirclement and suppression battle in Huhei-Henan-Anhui Soviet Area. After the Red Army suffered crushing defeats at the hands of National Revolutionary Army, he took part in the Long March and reached northwest China's Shaanxi in October 1936.

== Second Sino-Japanese War ==
During the Second Sino-Japanese War, he was political commissar of the headquarters of the 769th Regiment. He led his regiment at the Battle of Yangmingbao Airfield (阳明堡机场战役) and the Battle of Xiangtangpu (响堂铺战役). In 1941, he enrolled at the Central Party School of the Chinese Communist Party, staying in April 1944, when he was transferred to the 771th Regiment of 129th Division as political commissar under Commander Liu Bocheng.

== Chinese Civil War ==
During the Chinese Civil War, he was promoted to director of the Political Department of the New Fourth Brigade in 1948 for his actions at the operation for safeguarding Yan'an led by Peng Dehuai in Shaanxi. He also engaged in several important battles including the Battle of Qinghuabian (青化砭战役), the Battle of Yangmahe (杨马河战役), the Battle of Changjiagaoshan (常家高山战役), the Battle of Wayaobu (瓦窑堡战役), and the Battle of Wazijie (瓦子街战役). In the battle of Wazijie, his troops captured the Kuomintang chief commander Liu Zhengshi (刘正世) alive and forced the division commander Liu Kan (刘戡) to commit suicide. In August 1948, he was badly wounded in the Battle of Liberating Lanzhou. When he was fully recovered, he was given the position of deputy director of the Political Department of the New Fourth Brigade and marched to Xinjiang with the brigade.

== PRC era ==
After the establishment of the Communist State in 1949, he was appointed party secretary of Dihua (now Ürümqi). It would be his first job as "first-in-charge" of a city. In 1952, he became political commissar of the Sixth Army. In October 1956, he was appointed first secretary of Ili Kazakh Autonomous Prefecture, the top political position in the prefecture. In 1966, the Cultural Revolution broke out, he was brought to be persecuted and suffered political persecution. In August 1970, he was reinstated as party secretary of Xinjiang, a position he held until July 1972. In 1978, he took office as vice chairman of the Xinjiang Regional Committee of the Chinese People's Political Consultative Conference, two years later, he was promoted to become chairman, serving in the post until his resignation in 1981.

On 23 September 1992, he died in Ürümqi, aged 85.

Assembly seats
Preceded by Wang Feng	Chairman of the Xinjiang Regional Committee of the Chinese People's Political Consultative Conference; 1980–1981	Succeeded by Ismail Yasinov
