= Ezizi Musa =

Chinese politician (born 1963)

Eziz Musa

Vice Chairman of the Xinjiang Regional Committee of the Chinese People's Political Consultative Conference
- Incumbent
- Assumed office 4 February 2021
- Chairman: Nurlan Abilmazhinuly

Governor of Hotan Prefecture
- In office April 2012 – April 2021
- Party Secretary: Niu Xuexing; Yang Fasen
- Preceded by: Jür'et Emin
- Succeeded by: TBA

Personal details
- Born: February 1963 (age 63) Xayar County, Xinjiang, China
- Party: Chinese Communist Party
- Education: Xinjiang Agricultural University; Central Party School of the Chinese Communist Party

Uyghur name
- Uyghur: ئەزىزى مۇسا
Transcriptions
- Latin Yëziqi: Ezizi Musa

Chinese name
- Simplified Chinese: 艾则孜·木沙
- Traditional Chinese: 艾則孜·木沙
Transcriptions
Standard Mandarin
- Hanyu Pinyin: Àizézī Mùshā

Ezizi Musa (Uyghur: ئەزىزى مۇسا; Chinese: 艾则孜·木沙; born February 1963) is a Chinese politician of Uyghur ethnicity who is the current vice chairman of the Xinjiang Regional Committee of the Chinese People's Political Consultative Conference.

== Biography ==
Ezizi Musa was born in Xayar County, Xinjiang, in February 1963. In September 1980, he was accepted to Xinjiang Bayi Agricultural College (now Xinjiang Agricultural University), majoring in agricultural mechanization. After graduation, he worked in the government of his home-county. In February 1993, he became the deputy magistrate of Xayar County, rising to magistrate of Kuqa County in December 2000. In August 2006, he became a member of the standing committee of the CCP Aksu Prefectural Committee, the prefecture's top authority. In October 2007, he was appointed head of its United Front Work Department. He was deputy head of United Front Work Department of the CCP Xinjiang Uygur Autonomous Region Committee in September 2010, and held that office until March 2012, when he was made governor of Hotan Prefecture. In February 2021, he took office as vice chairman of the Xinjiang Regional Committee of the Chinese People's Political Consultative Conference.

Government offices
Preceded by Jür'et Emin	Governor of Hotan Prefecture; 2012–2021	Succeeded by TBA
