= Xinjiang People's Press =

Chinese state publisher

Xinjiang People's Press (Chinese: 新疆人民出版社), or Xinjiang People's Publishing House, situated at 348 Jiefang South Road, Tianshan District, Ürümqi, Xinjiang, China, is the preeminent publishing house in the Xinjiang Uygur Autonomous Region.

== History ==
Established on March 5, 1951, Xinjiang People's Press emerged from the expansion and reorganization of the former Compilation Division of the Xinjiang Provincial Committee of Culture and Education, functioning as a comprehensive publishing entity that produces books and periodicals in six scripts: Uyghur, Chinese, Kazakh, Mongolian, Kyrgyz, and Siberian. In July 2011, the Xinjiang Uygur Autonomous Regional Committee of the Chinese Communist Party and the People's Government of Xinjiang Uygur Autonomous Region resolved to utilize the Xinjiang People's Press as a platform through the amalgamation of Xinjiang Science and Technology Publishing House, Kashi Uygur Publishing House, Ili People's Publishing House, Kizilsu and Kirgiz Publishing Houses, Xinjiang People's Health Publishing House, and Xinjiang Audio and Video Publishing House. Currently, the Xinjiang People's Press (Xinjiang Minority Publishing Base) operates as a public welfare organization under the jurisdiction of the Publicity Department of the Xinjiang Uygur Autonomous Regional Committee of the Chinese Communist Party.
