= Yang Fasen =

Chinese politician

- 杨发森

Secretary of the Political and Legal Affairs Commission of the Qinghai Provincial Committee of the Chinese Communist Party
- In office May 2023 – October 2024
- Preceded by: Wang Linhu

Communist Party Secretary of Ürümqi
- In office 25 October 2021 – 13 May 2023
- Deputy: Memtimin Qadir (mayor); Yahefu Paidula (mayor)
- Preceded by: Xu Hairong
- Succeeded by: He Zhongyou

Communist Party Secretary of Hotan
- In office February 2018 – October 2021
- Deputy: Ezizi Musa (governor)
- Preceded by: Niu Xuexing
- Succeeded by: Liu Chen

Personal details
- Born: February 1971 (age 55) Gulang County, Gansu, China
- Party: Chinese Communist Party (expelled in March 2025)
- Education: Party School of the CCP Xinjiang Regional Committee

Military service
- Allegiance: People's Republic of China
- Branch/service: People's Liberation Army Ground Force
- Years of service: 1990–1994
- Unit: 36107 Army

Chinese name
- Simplified Chinese: 杨发森
- Traditional Chinese: 楊發森
Transcriptions
Standard Mandarin
- Hanyu Pinyin: Yáng Fāsēn

Yang Fasen (Chinese: 杨发森; born February 1971) is a Chinese politician who served as secretary of the Political and Legal Affairs Commission of the CCP Qinghai Provincial Committee from 2023 to 2024. He previously served as the vice chairman of Xinjiang, party secretary of Ürümqi and Hotan.

== Biography ==
Yang was born in Gulang County, Gansu, in February 1971. He enlisted in the People's Liberation Army in December 1990, serving until March 1994. He joined the Chinese Communist Party (CCP) in June 1993.

Yang studied briefly at the Party School in Aksu Prefecture before being assigned to Kumbash Township as an official in December 1994. He moved up the ranks to become party secretary in November 1999. After a short term as party secretary of Yiganqi Township, he was promoted to vice governor of Aksu Prefecture in September 2005, and then served as deputy party secretary between December 2008 and September 2010. In September 2010, he was appoint party secretary of Baicheng County. It would be his first job as "first-in-charge" of a county. After this office was terminated in July 2014, he became party secretary of Kuqa County, serving until December 2016. He became deputy secretary of Hotan in December 2016, and then party secretary, the top political position in the prefecture, beginning in February 2018. He concurrently served as vice chairman of Xinjiang since March 2021. On October 21, he was unanimously chosen as party secretary of Ürümqi, the capital of Xinjiang, becoming the youngest man to hold the position of top official in a provincial capital. He was also admitted to member of the standing committee of the CCP Xinjiang Regional Committee, the region's top authority.

In 2022, he was elected as an alternate of the 20th Central Committee. He was appointed as secretary of the Political and Legal Affairs Commission of the CCP Qinghai Provincial Committee in May 2023.

== Downfall ==
On 14 October 2024, Yang turned himself in and is cooperating with the Central Commission for Discipline Inspection (CCDI) and National Commission of Supervision for investigation of "suspected violations of disciplines and laws".

On 2 March 2025, Yang was expelled from the CCP and removed from public office. On March 20, he was arrested by the Supreme People's Procuratorate for suspected bribe taking. On June 5, he was indicted on suspicion of accepting bribes.

== Honors and awards ==
- June 2015 Title of National Excellent Party Secretary in a County

Party political offices
Preceded by Niu Xuexing	Communist Party Secretary of Hotan; 2018–2021	Succeeded by Liu Chen
Preceded by Xu Hairong	Communist Party Secretary of Ürümqi; 2021–present	Succeeded by He Zhongyou
Preceded by Wang Linhu	Secretary of the Political and Legal Affairs Commission of the Qinghai Provincial Committee of the Chinese Communist Party; 2023–2024	Succeeded by TBA
