= Cao Jianfang =

Chinese politician

- 曹建方

Secretary-general of the Yunnan Provincial Committee of the Chinese Communist Party
- In office December 2011 – December 2015
- Preceded by: Yang Yingnan
- Succeeded by: Li Yifei

Personal details
- Born: August 1957 (age 69) Yiliang County, Kunming, Yunnan, China
- Party: Chinese Communist Party (1976–2016; expelled)
- Education: Central University of Finance and Economics

Cao Jianfang (Chinese: 曹建方; pinyin: Cáo Jiànfāng; born August 1957) was a Chinese politician who served as secretary-general of the CCP Yunnan Provincial Committee between 2011 and 2015. On January 29, 2016, the Central Commission for Discipline Inspection announced he was expelled from the party and demoted.

== Career ==
Cao Jianfang was born in Yiliang County, Kunming, Yunnan in August 1957. He graduated from Central University of Finance and Economics and joined the Communist Party in July 1976. After graduating he became the officer of Yunnan Provincial Department of Finance. In 2003, Cao served as the director of Department of Finance and party chief of Chuxiong Yi Autonomous Prefecture in 2006. He became deputy governor of Yunnan in 2008 and secretary-general of the CPC Yunnan Committee in 2011, as well as a member of the provincial Party Standing Committee.

On January 29, 2016, the Central Commission for Discipline Inspection announced Cao Jianfang was expelled from the party and demoted sub-division level (fuchuji) due to having breached discipline.

Party political offices
Preceded by Ding Shaoxiang	Communist Party Secretary of Chuxiong Yi Autonomous Prefecture; 2006–2008	Succeeded by Deng Xianpei
Preceded by Yang Yingnan	Secretary-general of the Yunnan Provincial Committee of the Chinese Communist Party; 2011–2015	Succeeded by Li Yifei
