= Alpysbai Rakhimuly =

Chinese politician

Alpısbaý Raxımulı
- Алпысбай Рахымұлы

Vice Chairman of the Standing Committee of the People's Congress of Xinjiang Uygur Autonomous Region
- In office 2008–2013
- Chairman: Arken Imirbaki

Deputy Commander of Xinjiang Production and Construction Corps
- In office June 2001 – January 2008
- Commander: Zhang Qingli; Hua Shifei

Governor of Ili Kazakh Autonomous Prefecture
- In office March 1998 – June 2001
- Party Secretary: Zhou Yuan; Lin Tianxi
- Preceded by: Bekmūhammed Mūsaūly
- Succeeded by: Nurlan Abilmazhinuly

Governor of Tacheng Prefecture
- In office June 1993 – January 1997
- Party Secretary: Li Guimao; Wu Qilin
- Preceded by: Arystanbek (阿尔斯坦别克)
- Succeeded by: Qızaýjan Seýilqojaulı

Personal details
- Born: June 1948 (age 77–78) Tacheng Prefecture, Xinjiang, Republic of China
- Party: Chinese Communist Party

Chinese name
- Chinese: 阿勒布斯拜·拉合木
Transcriptions
Standard Mandarin
- Hanyu Pinyin: Ālèbùsībài Lāhémù

Alpysbai Rakhimuly (Kazakh: Алпысбай Рахымұлы, romanized: Alpısbaý Raxımulı; born June 1948) is a Chinese politician of Kazakh origin who served as vice chairman of the Standing Committee of the People's Congress of Xinjiang Uygur Autonomous Region from 2008 to 2013, deputy commander of Xinjiang Production and Construction Corps from 2001 to 2008, and governor of Ili Kazakh Autonomous Prefecture from 1998 to 2001.

== Biography ==
Alpysbai was born in Tacheng Prefecture, Xinjiang, in June 1948. He entered the workforce in October 1966, and joined the Chinese Communist Party (CCP) in November 1972. He taught at schools in Toli County for 10 years before becoming involved in politics in 1975. In June 1983, he was promoted to become deputy party secretary of Tacheng Prefecture, concurrently holding the governor position since June 1993. After a year as director of the Chemical Industry Department of Xinjiang Uygur Autonomous Region, he rose to become governor of Ili Kazakh Autonomous Prefecture in March 1998. In June 2001, he was commissioned as deputy commander of Xinjiang Production and Construction Corps, he remained in that position until January 2008, when he was made vice chairman of the Standing Committee of the People's Congress of Xinjiang Uygur Autonomous Region.

He was a delegate to the 7th, 8th and 9th National People's Congress.

Government offices
Preceded by Arystanbek (阿尔斯坦别克)	Governor of Tacheng Prefecture; 1993–1997	Succeeded by Qızaýjan Seýilqojaulı
Preceded by Bekmūhammed Mūsaūly	Governor of Ili Kazakh Autonomous Prefecture; 1998–2001	Succeeded by Nurlan Abilmazhinuly
