= Wang Enmao =

Chinese politician

- 王恩茂
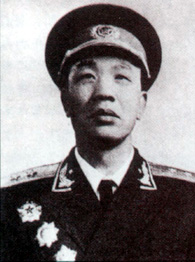
- Wang Enmao in 1955

Party Secretary of Xinjiang
- In office 1952–1967
- Preceded by: Wang Zhen
- Succeeded by: Long Shujin

Party Secretary of Xinjiang
- In office 1981–1985
- Preceded by: Wang Feng
- Succeeded by: Song Hanliang

Jilin Provincial Revolutionary Committee
- In office 1977–1981
- Preceded by: Wang Huaixiang
- Succeeded by: Qiang Xiaochu

Governor of Jilin
- In office 1977–1980
- Preceded by: Wang Huaixiang

Personal details
- Born: May 19, 1913 Yongxin County, Jiangxi Province
- Died: April 12, 2001 (aged 87) Beijing
- Party: Chinese Communist Party
- Occupation: Politician

Wang Enmao (Chinese: 王恩茂; May 19, 1913 – April 12, 2001) was a Chinese politician and a lieutenant general of the People's Liberation Army. He was born in Yongxin County, Jiangxi Province. He was twice Chinese Communist Party Committee Secretary of Xinjiang. He was Chinese Communist Party Committee Secretary and governor of Jilin.

== Biography ==
=== First Nationalist-Communist Civil War ===
Wang Enmao was born on May 19, 1913, in Yongxin County, Jiangxi Province, China. He became involved in the revolution in 1928 in Yongxin County, Xianggan Revolutionary Base, and affiliated with the Chinese Communist Party in 1930. In 1932, he assumed the role of Minister of Culture for the Yongxin County Soviet Government and the Secretary General of the CCP Yongxin County Party Committee, followed by his appointment as Secretary General of the CCP Xianggan Provincial Committee in 1933. In 1934, he participated in the Long March with the Sixth Red Army Regiment of the Chinese Workers and Peasants Red Army, originating from the Xianggan Revolutionary Base, and held the position of Secretary General of the Political Department of the Sixth Red Army Regiment. In 1934, he joined the Sixth Red Army of the Chinese Workers' and Peasants' Red Army on the Long March from the Xianggan Revolutionary Base, serving as the secretary-general of its Political Department. In 1935, he participated in the establishment of the Sichuan-Yunnan-Guizhou Revolutionary Base and held the position of secretary-general of the Sichuan-Yunnan-Guizhou Provincial Party Committee.

=== Second Sino-Japanese War ===
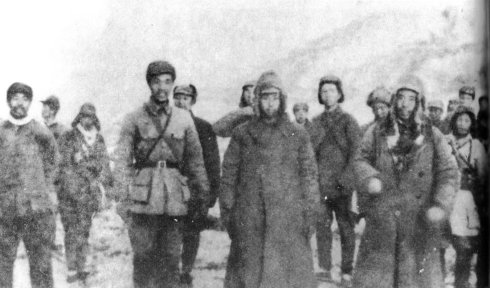
On December 27, 1944, the Southward Detachment of the Eighth Route Army stepped on ice to cross the Yellow River in Henan Province, advancing towards South China. From right in the front row are: Wang Zhen, Wang Shoudao and Wang Enmao.

In 1937, he was reassigned from the Political Department of the Sixth Red Army Corps to the Political Department of the Red Army, where he became the head of the General Affairs Office in the Political Department of the Red Second Front Army. In 1939, Wang Enmao followed the 359th Brigade in crossing the Yellow River from the anti-Japanese front in North China to the Shanxi-Gansu-Ningxia Border Region, undertaking the responsibilities of defending Northwest China, among others. In 1941, Wang Enmao participated in the Yan'an Institute of Military and Political Science and the Party School of the Central Committee. In 1944, he established the Southward Detachment of the Eighth Route Army, utilizing the 359th Brigade as the primary force, with Wang Zhen as Commander, Wang Shoudao as Political Commissioner, and Wang Enmao as Vice-Political Commissioner. The troops penetrated the Japanese blockade and proceeded south to rendezvous with the 5th Division of the New Fourth Army, commanded by Li Xiannian. Subsequently, the detachment was rebranded as the Hunan People's Anti-Japanese Rescue Army (Chinese: 湖南人民抗日救国军), and after over six months of marching and combat, it reached the central region of Hunan province. In 1945, the 359th Brigade was reinstated, with Guo Peng serving as the commander and Wang Enmao as the political commissar.

=== Second Nationalist-Communist Civil War ===
In June 1946, the Kuomintang initiated a comprehensive civil war and assaulted the CCP Central Plains Military Region. Wang Enmao orchestrated an escape from the Central Plains alongside Wang Zhen and successfully returned to Yan'an, Shaanxi Province. In October of that year, Wang Enmao across the Yellow River once more with the 359th Brigade and reached the Shanxi battleground. In March 1947, Wang Enmao traversed the Yellow River westward with the second column of Jinsui from the Jinnan region and reached the Shanxi-Gansu-Ningxia Border Region, where he assumed the role of Director of the Political Department of the Second Column of the Northwest Field Army (abbreviated as the Second Column). In July 1947, Wang Enmao was appointed deputy political commissar of the Second Column and commanded his forces in the battles of Shajiadian and Hancheng, among others. In 1948, Wang Enmao engaged in the Battle of Wazijie, the Battle of Xifu, and the Battle of Longdong alongside the Second Column.

=== People's Republic of China ===
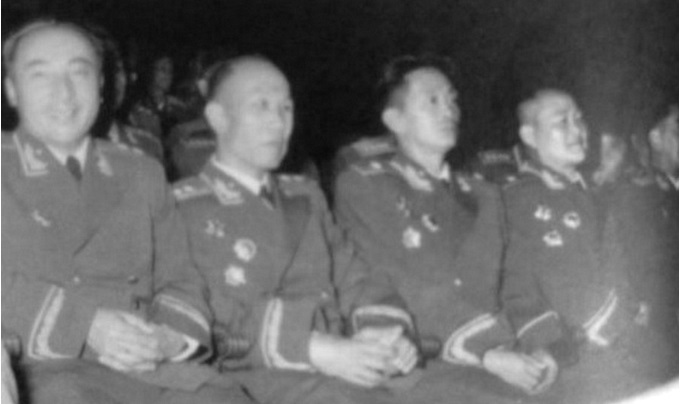
Some of the leaders of the Xinjiang Military Region at the awarding of honors in 1957. From left: Saifuddin Azizi, Wang Enmao, Gan Zuchang and Zuo Qi.

In 1949, Wang Enmao assumed the roles of political commissar and party secretary of the Second Army inside the First Corps of the First Field Army of the People's Liberation Army. Wang Enmao was deployed in Southern Xinjiang at the year's conclusion. He held positions as a member of the Xinjiang Branch of the CCP Central Committee, political commissar, and party secretary of the Kashgar Military Region, among others. In 1952, Wang Enmao held the positions of first secretary of the Xinjiang Branch of the CCP Central Committee, director of the Xinjiang Finance and Economy Committee, and acting political commissar of the Xinjiang Military Region. In 1954, upon the establishment of the Xinjiang Production and Construction Corps, Wang Enmao held the positions of Commander and political commissar of the Xinjiang Military Region.

In 1957, Wang described the existence Han Chauvinism as the "main contradiction" in Xinjiang and called for strengthening unity between all ethnic groups there.

In 1958, Wang identified the priorities for the Great Leap Forward in Xinjiang as completing the Lanzhou-Xinjiang Railway, introducing large-scale industrial production, and communization of agriculture.

In 1960, Wang was appointed secretary of the Northwest Bureau of the CCP Central Committee (Chinese: 中共中央西北局).

By 1962, as Sino-Soviet ties further deteriorated, the Soviet consulates in Urumqi and Yining covertly encouraged inhabitants of Xinjiang to defect to the Soviet Union. Covertly instigating Xinjiang inhabitants to escape the Soviet Union and orchestrate uprisings. During that period, coinciding with the strained circumstances along the Sino-Indian border, the primary contingent of the Xinjiang army was redeployed to Kashgar and remained immobilized. Wang Enmao and the Xinjiang Uygur Autonomous Regional Committee of the Chinese Communist Party resolved to assign the Corps' duty troops to the aforementioned tumultuous regions to aid the garrison of the current Specialized Prefecture in reestablishing law and order, and to inform the State Council of the People's Republic of China of the riot situation. Zhou Enlai and Mao Zedong resolved to permit Margub Iskhakov and Zunun Taipov to depart Xinjiang for the USSR, concurrently reallocating several cavalry units from Qinghai, Gansu, and Inner Mongolia to Xinjiang, and instructing Wang Enmao to orchestrate a grand entry ceremony in Urumqi to dissuade separatists.

Following the initiation of the Cultural Revolution in 1966, Wang Enmao faced persecution from Lin Biao and the Gang of Four. In 1975, he was reassigned to the Nanjing Military Region as deputy political commissar. By 1977, he ascended to the position of first secretary of the Jilin Provincial Committee, concurrently serving as the first political commissar and first secretary of the Jilin Military Region, as well as the first secretary of the Jilin Military Region. In 1981, the CCP Central Committee appointed Wang Enmao as the first secretary of the CCP Xinjiang Uygur Autonomous Region Committee and the first political commissar and first secretary of the Urumqi Military Region. In 1984, Wang Enmao assumed the role of the first political commissar and first secretary of the Party Committee of the Corps. In October 1985, Wang Enmao assumed leadership of the CCP Xinjiang Uygur Autonomous Region Advisory Committee.

In March 1986, during the fourth session of the 6th National Committee of the Chinese People's Political Consultative Conference (CPPCC), Wang Enmao was appointed Vice Chairman of the CPPCC. In March 1988, he was re-elected as Vice Chairman of the Seventh National Committee of the CPPCC and retired in March 1993. He died at the age of 88 on April 12, 2001, in Beijing.

Wang Enmao's body was cremated in the Babaoshan Revolutionary Cemetery in Beijing on April 18, 2001. Li Peng, Hu Jintao, Zhang Wannian, Wen Jiabao, Zeng Qinghong, Qiao Shi, Song Ping, Liu Huaqing, Zou Jiahua, Wang Guangying, Buhe, Tömür Dawamat, Simayi Aimaiti, Wang Zhongyu, Han Zhubin, Ngapoi Ngawang Jigme, Song Jian, Li Guixian, Chen Junsheng, Zhu Guangya, Zhao Nanqi, Bai Lichen, Jing Shuping, Luo Haocai, Liao Hansheng, Ma Wenrui, Yang Baibing, Wang Hanbin, Hong Xuezhi, and Deng Liqun. Members of the Central Military Commission, including Yu Yongbo, Wang Ruilin, Guo Boxiong, and other senior CCP leaders, went to bid farewell.

Party political offices
Preceded by Wang Zhen	Party Secretary of Xinjiang; 1952–1967	Succeeded by Long Shujin
Preceded by Wang Feng	Party Secretary of Xinjiang; 1981–1985	Succeeded by Song Hanliang
Preceded by Wang Huaixiang	Jilin Provincial Revolutionary Committee; 1977–1981	Succeeded by Qiang Xiaochu
Preceded by Wang Huaixiang	Governor of Jilin; 1977–1980	Succeeded by Yu Ke
