= Nijat Sultan =

Chinese politician

- نىجات سۇلتان

Vice Chairman of the Standing Committee of the People's Congress of Xinjiang Uygur Autonomous Region
- Incumbent
- Assumed office January 2015
- Chairman: Shewket Imin

Personal details
- Born: October 1956 (age 69–70) Artux, Xinjiang, China
- Party: Chinese Communist Party
- Education: Renmin University of China; Central Party School of the Chinese Communist Party

Chinese name
- Simplified Chinese: 里加提·苏里堂
- Traditional Chinese: 里加提·蘇里堂
Transcriptions
Standard Mandarin
- Hanyu Pinyin: Lǐjiātí Sūlǐtáng

Nijat Sultan (Uyghur: نىجات سۇلتان; Chinese: 里加提·苏里堂; born October 1956) is a Chinese politician of Uyghur ethnicity who is the current vice chairman of the Standing Committee of the People's Congress of Xinjiang Uygur Autonomous Region.

== Biography ==
Nijat Sultan was born in Artux, Xinjiang, in October 1956. During the late Cultural Revolution, he was a sent-down youth in Ürümqi. In November 1978, he became a warehouse keeper in Xinjiang Agricultural Machinery Bureau Supply Station and was transferred to the Land Bureau of Xinjiang Uygur Autonomous Region in May 1985. He joined the Chinese Communist Party in February 1987. He was deputy head of the Audit Office of Xinjiang Uygur Autonomous Region in October 2005, and held that office until March 2008, when he was promoted to become head of the Department of Communications of Xinjiang Uygur Autonomous Region. In January 2015, he was elevated to vice chairman of the Standing Committee of the People's Congress of Xinjiang Uygur Autonomous Region. He also served a short term as chairman of the Xinjiang Federation of Trade Unions from May 2015 to November 2016.

Civic offices
Preceded by Erkinjan Turghun	Chairman of the Xinjiang Federation of Trade Unions; 2015–2016	Succeeded by ?
