= Xinjiang Branch of the Central Committee of the Chinese Communist Party =

Former Chinese Communist Party body

The Xinjiang Branch of the Central Committee of the Chinese Communist Party (Chinese: 中共中央新疆分局) was the principal authority of the Chinese Communist Party (CCP) in Xinjiang Province following its incorporation into the People's Republic of China in 1949 until 1955.

== History ==
A political agreement with the Coalition Government of Xinjiang Province, formed by the Nationalists and the former Second East Turkestan Republic, allowed the peaceful takeover of Xinjiang on September 25, 1949. On October 9, 1949, Peng Dehuai, the first secretary of the Northwest Bureau of the Chinese Communist Party and commander and political commissar of the First Field Army, sent a telegram from Jiuquan to the Central Committee of the Chinese Communist Party requesting guidance on the establishment of the CCP's leadership organs in Xinjiang and presented a list of recommendations. On October 12, the CCP Central Committee directed Peng Dehuai and Gan Siqi, the director of the Political Department, to propose the formation of a subbranch as a component of the CCP's leadership organs in Xinjiang, and consented to appoint Wang Zhen as secretary.

On November 7, 1949, the Xinjiang Branch of the CCP Central Committee was officially established. On October 1, 1955, the Xinjiang Branch was reinstated as the Xinjiang Uygur Autonomous Regional Committee of the CCP.

== Key officials ==
- Secretary: Wang Zhen, Commander of the First Corps
- Deputy Secretary: Xu Liqing, Political Commissar of the First Corps
- Secretary-General: Deng Liqun, Commissioner of the CCP Central Committee, member of the Standing Committee of the Branch, head of the Publicity Department, secretary of the Youth Working Branch, and head of the Foreign Affairs Committee.

On June 28, 1952, Wang Zhen was dismissed from his primary CCP roles, administration, and military due to the Xinjiang Branch's operations in the pastoral regions. The restructured Xinjiang Branch comprised the following officials:

- Secretary:
  - Wang Enmao (first, also political commissar of the military region and director of the Xinjiang Finance Committee)
  - Xu Liqing (second)
  - Zhang Bangying (third, and Director of the Military Region Political Department)
  - Saifuddin Azizi (fourth)
- Standing Committee:
  - Burhan Shahidi (Chairman of the Xinjiang Government)
  - Wang Zhen (Deputy Commander of the Military Region, Acting Commander)
  - Gao Jinchun (Vice Chairman of the Xinjiang Government)
  - Rao Zhengxi (Deputy Secretary of the Discipline Inspection Committee of the Xinjiang Branch, Head of the Organization Department, Secretary of the CCP Dihua Municipal Committee, Mayor of Dihua)

== See also ==
- Xinjiang Production and Construction Corps Committee of Chinese Communist Party
- Xinjiang Production and Construction Corps
