= Xue Bin =

Chinese politician

- 薛斌

Commander of Xinjiang Production and Construction Corps
- Incumbent
- Assumed office 11 February 2022
- Political Commissioner: Ma Xingrui
- Preceded by: Peng Jiarui

Personal details
- Born: April 1966 (age 60) Wubu County, Shaanxi, China
- Party: Chinese Communist Party
- Education: Tongji University

Military service
- Allegiance: People's Republic of China
- Branch/service: People's Liberation Army Ground Force
- Years of service: 2022–present
- Unit: Xinjiang Production and Construction Corps

Xue Bin (Chinese: 薛斌; pinyin: Xuē Bīn; born April 1966) is a Chinese politician and the current vice chairman of Xinjiang Uygur Autonomous Region and commander of Xinjiang Production and Construction Corps. He entered the workforce in July 1987, and joined the Chinese Communist Party in July 1998.

== Biography ==
Xue was born in Wubu County, Shaanxi, in April 1966. In 1983, he was accepted to Tongji University, majoring in city planning. After university, he was assigned to Xinjiang Urban and Rural Planning and Design Institute. He got involved in politics in November 1992, when he was despatched to the Land Planning and Construction Bureau of Ürümqi Economic and Technological Development Zone. In March 1995, he was appointed deputy head of the Urban and Rural Planning Division of the Department of Construction of Xinjiang Uygur Autonomous Region, rising to head in May 2001. In October 2002, he became assistant mayor of Turpan, and then secretary-general in January 2008. In September 2010, he was promoted to become party secretary of Korla, a position he held until January 2016, when he was made deputy party secretary and executive vice mayor of Ürümqi. He became party secretary of Tacheng Prefecture in March 2017, and served until September 2021. He was promoted to be vice chairman of Xinjiang Uygur Autonomous Region in September 2021, concurrently serving as commander of Xinjiang Production and Construction Corps since February 2022.

Party political offices
Preceded by Erkinjan Turghun	Communist Party Secretary of Tacheng Prefecture; 2017–2021	Succeeded by Wei Jianguo (魏建国)
Government offices
Preceded by Peng Jiarui	Commander of Xinjiang Production and Construction Corps; 2022–present	Incumbent
