= Qiang Xiaochu =

Chinese politician

Qiang Xiaochu (Chinese: 强晓初; 1918–2007) was a People's Republic of China politician. He was born in Zichang County, Yan'an, Shaanxi Province. He was Chinese Communist Party Committee Secretary of Jilin Province.

Preceded by Wang Enmao	Communist Party Chief of Jilin	Succeeded by Gao Di
