= Zhang Bangying =

Chinese politician

Zhang Bangying (May 1910 – June 29, 2010, pinyin: Zhāng Bāngyīng), a native of Yao County, Shaanxi Province, is a politician in the People's Republic of China. He contributed to the establishment of the Shaan-Gan-Ning Border Region and held the position of Vice Minister of Civil Affairs of the People's Republic of China.

== Biography ==
=== Republic of China ===
Zhang Bangying was born into a farming family and commenced primary education at the age of seven. at 1925, he was enrolled at Shaanxi Minli High School in Xi'an. In the autumn of 1926, Zhang Bangying proactively participated in a gathering of peasant delegates and other progressive youths, thereafter traveling to rural areas to advocate to the peasants for resistance against food requisitions, monetary demands, taxation, contributions, and the warlords.

In early 1927, he joined the Communist Youth League of China and became a member of the Chinese Communist Party (CCP) in August. By November, he was appointed secretary of the Party branch at Minli Middle School, and in May 1928, he assumed the role of secretary of the Party's special branch. In May 1928, he assumed the role of secretary for the Party's special branch and successfully executed the clandestine duty of transporting Party documents to the front lines of the Weihua Uprising as directed by his superiors. During the winter of 1932, he assumed the role of secretary of the CCP Yaoxian County Committee, fostering Party structures and spearheading the farmers' movements. In July 1933, he collaborated with the Northwest People's Anti-Japanese Volunteer Army during the Uprising and acted as a Party spokesperson for the Yaohui County Partisan Army. Subsequent to the insurrection, he commanded his forces into the Zhaogin Revolutionary Base, engaged with the Shaanxi-Gansu guerrilla army under the leadership of Liu Zhidan, Xi Zhongxun, and Wu Daifeng, and held the position of Party representative for the third detachment of the Shaanxi-Gansu guerrilla army in Yaocheng County. In November, he assumed the role of political instructor for the second company of the third regiment of the Red Twenty-sixth Army, before relocating to the Shaanxi-Gansu border region. In 1936, he assumed leadership of the political department of the Guanzhong Military Region. He was involved in the establishment of the Shanxi-Gansu Soviet District. In the latter half of the same year, he enrolled in the advanced class at the Central Party School. From December of the same year until April 1937, he served as the Organization Minister for the CCP Shaanxi and Gansu Provincial Committees (Chinese: 中共陕甘省委).

From May 1937 to November 1939, Zhang Bangying was an alternate executive member of the Shaanxi-Gansu-Ningxia Special Committee. He held the position of head of the Organization Department from May to September 1937 and from spring 1938 to November 1939. Additionally, he served as deputy head of the Organization Department from September 1937 to spring 1938 and from November 1939 to September 1940. Furthermore, he was deputy head of the Organization Department from April 1938 to September 1940. In September 1940, he assumed the role of principal at the Party School of the Shaanxi-Gannin Special Committee. In January 1939, he was elected vice-president of the Regional Senate during its inaugural session. From September 1940 to May 1941, he served as a member of the Standing Committee of the Central Bureau of the CCP Shaanxi-Gannin Border Region, Minister of Social Affairs, Deputy Minister of the Organization Department of the Central Bureau of the Shaanxi-Gannin Border Region (until June 1943), and principal of the Party School of the Border Region. Additionally, from November 1940 to May 1941, he held the position of deputy director of the Organization Department of the Central Bureau of the Shaanxi-Gannin Border Region. In November 1940, he was designated as a member of the Finance and Economy Committee of the Shanxi-Gansu-Ningxia Border Region. From May 1941 to August 1945, he served as a member of the CCP Northwest Bureau, Deputy Minister of the Organization Department, and President of the Northwest Party School (until August 1942).

Beginning in December 1941, Zhang Bangying served on the Education Committee of the CCP Northwest Bureau. In June 1942, he became a member of both the Party Affairs Research Committee and the Mass Work Research Committee of the Northwest Bureau. By August, he assumed the role of presiding officer of the sub-committee of the Northwest Bureau focused on the simplification of the army and soldiers. From December of that year until September 1943, he held the position of political commissar for the Yanzhi Military Sub-District within the Shanxi-Gansu-Ningxia-Jinsui Joint Defense Force. From January 1943 to August 1944, he held the position of secretary of the Yanzhi Local Committee of the CCP Shanxi-Gansu-Ningxia Border Region and served as a political commissar of the Yan'an Garrison until September 1943. Beginning in February 1943, he was appointed as a political commissar of the 359th Brigade of the 120th Division of the Eighth Route Army, and from July, he became a member of the study committee of the Party and People's Work System of the Northwest Bureau. Subsequent to October, he attended the Central Party School, initially holding the position of deputy director of the First Department and subsequently advancing to director of the Fourth Department. From April to June 1945, he participated in the Seventh CCP Congress as a delegate from the Shanxi-Gansu-Ningxia Border Region. Following the triumph in the Anti-Japanese War, from August 1945 to September 1949, he served as a member of the CCP Northwest Bureau and as Director of the Organization Department of the Jinsui Branch of the CCP Central Committee (until November 1946).

From September 1945 until late 1948, Zhang Bangying served as a member of the Jinsui Sub-bureau and held the position of Deputy Secretary of the Sub-bureau until 1947. From June 1946 to 1948, he served as the Secretary of the Work Committee for the People's Movement of the Jinsui Sub-bureau and as the Acting Secretary of the Suide Local Party Committee of the Shanxi-Gansu-Ningxia Border Region until June 1948. From May 1947 to March 1948, he served as the Secretary of the Party Committee of the Jinsui Sub-bureau. From March 1948 to June 1948, he served as the political commissar of the Suide Military Sub-District under the Shanxi-Gansu-Ningxia-Jinsui-Suide Joint Defense Force; from June to December 1948, he held the position of secretary-general of the CCP Northwest Bureau. From December of the same year until January 1950, he served as the first secretary of the CCP Southern Shaanxi Regional Committee, and from May to September 1949, he held the position of the first political commissar of the Southern Shaanxi Military Region.

=== People's Republic of China ===
From May 1949 until December 1950, Zhang Bangying served simultaneously as the inaugural political commissar of the Southern Shaanxi Military Region and the 19th Army. He became a member of the Standing Committee of the Party Committee in May 1950 and assumed the role of Deputy Secretary of the Party Committee in November.From October 1949 to December 1954, Zhang Bangying was a member of the CCP Northwestern Bureau of the Central Committee. He was a member of the Northwestern Military and Political Committee from December 1949 to January 1953. From January 1950 to March 1951, he served as deputy secretary of the CCP Shaanxi Provincial Committee, vice governor of the Shaanxi Provincial People's Government, and director of the Southern Shaanxi Administration. He served as the deputy secretary of the Party Group of the Shaanxi Provincial People's Government from February 1950 until March 1951. From August 1950 to March 1951, he held the position of vice chairman of the Consultative Committee of the First Shaanxi People's Representatives' Conference of the People's Congresses (Chinese: 陕西省第一届各界人民代表会议协商委员会).

He was assigned to the Third Branch of the Xinjiang Branch of the CCP Central Committee from November 1950 until December 1954. From January 1951 to September 1954, he held the position of director of the political department of the Xinjiang Military Region, and concurrently, from April 1951 to December 1953, he served as the head of the Military Law Office of the Military Region. From May 1951 to August 1952, he held the position of chairman of the Preparatory Committee for the Peasants' Association of Xinjiang Province. From June 1951 to December 1954, he held the position of secretary of the Disciplinary Inspection Committee of the CCP Xinjiang branch and served as the secretary of the Party Committee of the Xinjiang Military Region. From June 1951 to December 1954, he served as the secretary of the Disciplinary Inspection Committee of the CCP Xinjiang Branch, and was a member of the Party Committee as well as the secretary of the Disciplinary Inspection Committee of the Xinjiang Military Region. From August 1953 to September 1954, he served as a member of the Standing Committee of the Party Committee of the Military Region. He served as a member of the Northwestern Administrative Committee from January 1953 until December 1954. From November 1953 to July 1954, he served as the principal of the Party School of the Xinjiang Branch. From March to December 1954, he was appointed as the chief of the Rural Work Department of the CCP Northwestern Bureau.

From July to December 1954, he held the position of director of the Organization Department of the CCP Northwest Bureau. In early 1955, he furthermore held the position of deputy director of the CCP Northwest Regional Work Department. From January 1955 to December 1956, he held the position of deputy director of the Second Office of the Secretariat of the Central Committee (Chinese: 中共中央书记处第二办公室). From November 1956 to October 1960, he held the position of deputy director of the Department of Transportation and Industry of the CCP Central Committee (Chinese: 中共中央交通工业部). From November 1960 to December 1966, he held the position of alternate secretary of the CCP North China Bureau. He faced persecution during the Cultural Revolution. From June 1975 to October 1976, he served as the Minister of the United Front Work Department of the CCP Shanxi Provincial Committee. Subsequently, from December 1977 to December 1979, he held the position of Vice Chairman of the Fourth Shanxi Provincial Committee of the Chinese People's Political Consultative Conference (CPPCC). Additionally, from May 1978 to March 1982, he was the Vice Minister of the Ministry of Civil Affairs.

He was a member of the Standing Committee of the 1st National People's Congress and also served on the Standing Committees of the Third, Fourth, and Fifth National Committees of the Chinese People's Political Consultative Conference. He served as a delegate to the 8th CCP National Congress (CCP). He was elected to the Central Advisory Commission during the 12th and 13th CCP Congresses, and delegate invited to the 13th, 14th, 15th, and 16th CCP National Congresses.

Zhang Bangying died in Beijing on June 29, 2010, at the age of 100.
