= Li Yifei =

Chinese Communist Party politician

- 李邑飞
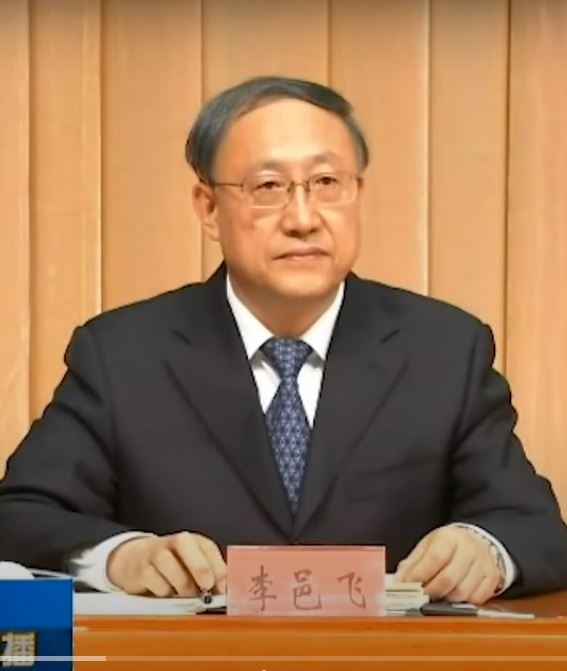

Party Secretary of Ningxia
- Incumbent
- Assumed office 28 June 2024
- Deputy: Zhang Yupu
- Preceded by: Liang Yanshun

Political Commissar of Xinjiang Production and Construction Corps
- In office 19 October 2021 – 28 June 2024
- Preceded by: Wang Junzheng
- Succeeded by: He Zhongyou

Personal details
- Born: January 1964 (age 62) Mojiang County, Yunnan, China
- Party: Chinese Communist Party
- Education: Kunming Medical University; Tsinghua University

Chinese name
- Simplified Chinese: 李邑飞
- Traditional Chinese: 李邑飛
Transcriptions
Standard Mandarin
- Hanyu Pinyin: Lǐ Yìfēi

Li Yifei (born January 1964) is a Chinese politician who is the current Party Secretary of Ningxia, in office since June 2024. He previously served as political commissar and party secretary of Xinjiang Production and Construction Corps (XPCC).

He was a representative of the 19th National Congress of the Chinese Communist Party. He is a member of the 20th Central Committee of the Chinese Communist Party.

== Early life and education ==
Li was born in Mojiang County, Yunnan, in January 1964. In 1980, he enrolled in Kunming Medical University, majoring in hygiene, after graduating in 1985, he worked at the university. He also earned his Master of Public Administration degree from Tsinghua University in 2008.

== Career in Yunnan ==
He got involved in politics in June 1986, when he was appointed as an official in the Yunnan Provincial Labor and Personnel Department and then to Yunnan Provincial Economic and Trade Commission in November 1998. In November 2001, he was made deputy director of Yunnan Provincial Nonferrous Geological Bureau, and served until July 2003, when he was transferred to Dêqên Tibetan Autonomous Prefecture and appointed deputy party secretary. In December 2009, he took office as deputy party secretary of Kunming, a major city and the capital of Yunnan. In December 2012, he became deputy secretary-general of Yunnan, rising to secretary-general in February 2015. He became a member of the Standing Committee of the Yunnan Provincial Committee of the Chinese Communist Party (CCP) in May 2016 before being assigned to the similar position in the neighboring Guizhou province in March 2017. He also served as head of Organization Department of CCP Guizhou Provincial Committee between April 2017 and May 2020.

== Career in Xinjiang ==
In May 2020, he was assigned to northwest China's Xinjiang Uygur Autonomous Region, where he was admitted to member of the standing committee of the CCP Xinjiang Regional Committee, the region's top authority. He was head of Organization Department of CCP Xinjiang Regional Committee in June 2020, and held that office until July 2021, when he was promoted to become deputy party secretary of Xinjiang and party secretary of Education Committee. On 19 October 2021, he took up the post of political commissar and party secretary of Xinjiang Production and Construction Corps, concurrently serving as chairman of China Xinjian Group Corporation. His predecessor Wang Junzheng was appointed party secretary of Tibet.

== Career in Ningxia ==
On 26 June 2024, Li was appointed party secretary of Ningxia, succeeding Liang Yanshun.

Government offices
Preceded by Mao Wenguo	Secretary-General of Yunnan Provincial People's Government; 2015–2016	Succeeded by He Jinping
Party political offices
Preceded by Cao Jianfang	Secretary-General of CPC Yunnan Provincial Committee; 2016–2017	Succeeded by Liu Huiyan
Preceded by Sun Yongchun	Head of Organization Department of CPC Guizhou Provincial Committee; 2017–2020	Succeeded by Liu Jie
Preceded by Ji Zheng	Head of Organization Department of CPC Xinjiang Uygur Autonomous Regional Committee; 2020–2021	Succeeded by Zhang Zhu
Preceded by Li Pengxin	Secretary of Education Committee of CPC Xinjiang Uygur Autonomous Regional Committee; 2021	Succeeded by Zhang Chunlin
Preceded by Wang Junzheng	Political Commissar of Xinjiang Production and Construction Corps; 2021–2024	Succeeded by He Zhongyou
Preceded by Liang Yanshun	Party Secretary of Ningxia; 2024–present	Incumbent
