= Second Affiliated Hospital of Kunming Medical University =

Second Affiliated Hospital of Kunming Medical University 昆明医科大学第二附属医院

Geography
- Location: Kunming, China
- Coordinates: 25.054986°N 102.681066°E

Organisation
- Funding: Public hospital
- Type: Teaching
- Affiliated university: Kunming Medical University

Services
- Emergency department: Yes
- Beds: 1,500

History
- Opened: 1952

Links
- Website: www.kyfey.com
- Lists: Hospitals in China

The Second Affiliated Hospital of Kunming Medical University (KMU) (昆明医科大学第二附属医院) is a large general hospital in the capital of Yunnan Province, China. Established in 1952, it is among the "100 best general hospitals of China" and is the center for both human organ transplant and burn treatment in Yunnan. It has the first certified resident training center in Yunnan Province, started in 2006.
