= Erkinjan Turaxun =

Chinese politician

- ئەركىنجان تۇراخۇن

Head of United Front Work Department of CCP Hubei Provincial Committee
- In office April 2017 – June 2022
- Preceded by: Liang Huiling
- Succeeded by: Ning Yong

Communist Party Secretary of Tacheng Prefecture
- In office January 2015 – March 2017
- Preceded by: Zhang Bo
- Succeeded by: Xue Bin

Personal details
- Born: June 1964 (age 62) Kashgar Prefecture, Xinjiang, China
- Party: Chinese Communist Party
- Education: Xinjiang University of Finance and Economics; Xinjiang University; Central Party School of the Chinese Communist Party; Cheung Kong Graduate School of Business

Chinese name
- Simplified Chinese: 尔肯江·吐拉洪
- Traditional Chinese: 爾肯江·吐拉洪
Transcriptions
Standard Mandarin
- Hanyu Pinyin: Ĕrkěnjiāng Tǔlāhóng

Erkinjan Turaxun (Uyghur: ئەركىنجان تۇراخۇن, Әркинҗан Турахун; Chinese: 尔肯江·吐拉洪; born June 1964) is a Chinese politician of Uyghur ethnicity who served as chairman of the Hubei Federation of Trade Unions, vice chairman of the Hubei Provincial Committee of the Chinese People's Political Consultative Conference, and head of United Front Work Department of Hubei Provincial Committee of the Chinese Communist Party from 2017 to 2022. He joined the Chinese Communist Party in January 1985, and entered the workforce in July that same year.

He was an alternate of the 18th Central Committee of the Chinese Communist Party, a representative of the 19th National Congress of the Chinese Communist Party, and a member of the 13th National Committee of the Chinese People's Political Consultative Conference.

== Early life and education ==
Erkinjan Turaxun was born in Kashgar Prefecture, Xinjiang, in June 1964. In 1981, he was admitted to Xinjiang University of Finance and Economics, majoring in planning statistics. After graduation, he worked at the Communist Youth League of China of the university.

== Career in Xinjiang ==
In May 1999, he was promoted to become secretary of the Xinjiang Uygur Autonomous Region of the Communist Youth League of China, a position he held until July 2003, when he was transferred to Beijing and appointed secretary of the Secretariat of the Central Committee of the Communist Youth League of China. In May 2008, he was admitted to member of the standing committee of the CPC Xinjiang Uygur Autonomous Regional Committee, the region's top authority. One month later, he was made chairman of the Xinjiang Federation of Trade Unions and vice chairman of All-China Federation of Trade Unions. In January 2015, he was appointed party secretary of Tacheng Prefecture, the top political position in prefecture.

== Career in Hubei ==
In April 2017, Erkinjan Turaxun was transferred to Central China's Hubei province, where he took office as head of United Front Work Department of Hubei Provincial Committee of the Chinese Communist Party, vice chairman of the Hubei Provincial Committee of the Chinese People's Political Consultative Conference, and chairman of Hubei Federation of Trade Unions.

Civic offices
Preceded by Shewket Imin	Secretary of the Xinjiang Uygur Autonomous Region of the Communist Youth League of China; May 1999–July 2003	Succeeded by Elixan Osman
Preceded by Memetjan Emet	Chairman of the Xinjiang Federation of Trade Unions; June 2008–May 2015	Succeeded by Nijat Sultan
Preceded by Liang Huiling	Chairman of the Hubei Federation of Trade Unions; May 2017–July 2022	Succeeded by Liu Xuerong
Party political offices
Preceded by Zhang Bo	Communist Party Secretary of Tacheng Prefecture; February 2015–March 2017	Succeeded by Xue Bin
Preceded by Liang Huiling	Head of United Front Work Department of Hubei Provincial Committee of the Chinese Communist Party; April 2017–June 2022	Succeeded by Ning Yong
