= Wang Lequan =

Chinese politician (born 1944)

Wang Lequan 王乐泉

Party Secretary of Xinjiang
- In office 24 September 1994 – 24 April 2010
- Preceded by: Song Hanliang
- Succeeded by: Zhang Chunxian

Personal details
- Born: 21 December 1944 (age 81) Showkwang, Shantung, China
- Party: Chinese Communist Party (1966–2012)

Wang Lequan
- Traditional Chinese: 王樂泉
- Simplified Chinese: 王乐泉
Transcriptions
Standard Mandarin
- Hanyu Pinyin: Wáng Lèquán

Wang Lequan (born 21 December 1944) is a Chinese retired politician, most notable for being the Party Secretary of Xinjiang, the autonomous region's top political office, between 1994 and 2010. From 2002 to 2012, Wang was also a member of the Politburo of the Chinese Communist Party. From 2010 to 2012 he was a Deputy Secretary of the Central Political and Legal Affairs Commission. He retired from active politics in 2012, and served President of the China Law Society from November 2013 to March 2019.

== Life and career ==
=== Shandong ===
Wang Lequan was born in Shouguang, Shandong in December 1944. He joined the Chinese Communist Party in 1966. He was a post-graduate at the Central Party School of the CCP Central Committee. From 1982 to 1986, he held the position of deputy secretary of the Shandong Provincial Committee of the Communist Youth League. In 1986, he became deputy secretary of the Liaocheng Prefecture Committee of Shandong Province. In 1988, he ascended to the role of secretary of the Liaocheng Prefecture Committee. In 1989, he was elevated to deputy governor of the Shandong Provincial People's Government.

=== Xinjiang ===
Wang was the Secretary of the CCP Xinjiang Committee from 1994 until 2010. As Secretary, he was responsible for implementing modernization programs in Xinjiang. He encouraged industrialization, development of commerce, and investments in roads and railways. He furthered the development of the oil and gas fields in the region, link-up of pipelines from Kazakhstan to eastern China.

Wang was a member of the 16th and the 17th Politburos of the Central Committee of the Chinese Communist Party. He is known for his hardline approach to ethnic minorities. He acquired the nickname "the stability secretary" for his ability to enter into a chaotic situation and bring it to order.

=== Beijing ===
He was succeeded by Zhang Chunxian as Xinjiang Party Secretary in April 2010, and transferred to work on the Central Political and Legal Affairs Commission as a Deputy Secretary under Zhou Yongkang. Wang remained in the Political and Legal Affairs Committee until the 18th Party Congress when he retired from active politics. On 30 November 2013, Wang became the president of the China Law Society. He retired from the China Law Society in March 2019.

Party political offices
| Preceded by Song Hanliang | Party Secretary of Xinjiang; 1994–2010 | Succeeded by Zhang Chunxian |
