= Song Hanliang =

Chinese politician (1934–2000)

- 宋汉良
- Born: December 1934; Shaoxing, Zhejiang Province
- Died: October 3, 2000 (aged 65); Beijing
- Occupation: politician
- Political party: Chinese Communist Party

Song Hanliang (Chinese: 宋汉良; December 1934 – October 3, 2000) was a Chinese politician, notable for being the Party Secretary of the Xinjiang Uygur Autonomous Regional Committee of the Chinese Communist Party during the reform and opening up era.

== Biography ==
Song Hanliang was born in 1934 in Shaoxing, Zhejiang Province. In January 1952, Song became a member of the Communist Youth League of China, and in June 1960, he joined the Chinese Communist Party. He graduated from the Geology Department of Northwestern University in June 1954 and then commenced his career in the petroleum sector in Xinjiang. From September 1966 to September 1966, he held positions as a trainee at Xinjiang Sino-Soviet Petroleum Company (Chinese: 新疆中苏石油公司), geologist and captain at Xinjiang Petroleum Management Bureau, head of the Geological Research Office at Xinjiang Petroleum Management Bureau, geologist and head of the Regional Exploration Research Office at Xinjiang Petroleum Management Bureau, and Acting Secretary of the Party Committee and Director of the Political Department at Xinjiang Petroleum Research Institute. He was consecutively involved in field geological surveys, extensive petroleum geological research, and petroleum exploration management, among other activities.

In May 1971, he resumed his professional duties after the negative impact of Cultural Revolution. He subsequently held positions as the head of the exploration team in the production management office of the Oilfield Research Institute of Xinjiang Petroleum Administration (Chinese: 新疆石油管理局), deputy director of the geology department, director of the geology department, and deputy chief geologist of the Administration. From January 1980 to April 1983, he was a member of the Standing Committee of the CCP Xinjiang Petroleum Administration and served as the deputy director of Xinjiang Petroleum Administration. During this period, Song implemented foreign advanced technology and expanded oil exploration to the eastern and hinterland of Junggar Basin and Tarim Basin, significantly contributing to the discovery of the oil-bearing pattern of the Karamay-Orku thrust belt (Chinese: 克拉玛依−乌尔禾断裂带) at the northwestern edge of the Junggar Basin.

In April 1983, Song Hanliang was appointed Vice Chairman of the Xinjiang Uygur Autonomous Region and oversaw Project 305 of the State Key Science and Technology Tackling Program, titled "Comprehensive Research on Accelerating the Identification of Xinjiang's Geological and Mineral Resources," which initiated the exploration, development, and industrialization of Xinjiang's mineral resources. He served as the Secretary of the Xinjiang Uygur Autonomous Region Party Committee from October 1985 to December 1994, concurrently holding the positions of First Political Commissar of the Xinjiang Military Region and First Secretary and First Political Commissar of the Xinjiang Production and Construction Corps. Throughout his term, he prioritized economic growth by establishing a production base for Xinjiang's grain, cotton, sugar, and animal goods, therefore considerably enhancing the region's economic strength. During this period, infrastructure was enhanced, encompassing the completion of the Northern Xinjiang Railway, Lanzhou–Xinjiang railway, Dushanzi Ethylene Plant (Dushanzi Petrochemical Company), Manas Power Plant (Chinese: 玛纳斯电厂), Xinjiang-Lanzhou-Orku Fiber Optic Cable, Heizir Reservoir, and Wuluwati Dam, which established the groundwork for subsequent construction and development in Xinjiang.

Song Hanliang served as an alternate member of the 12th Central Committee of the Chinese Communist Party, and as a member of the 13th and 14th Central Committees. He was also a delegate to the 6th, 7th, and 8th National People's Congresses. He died on October 3, 2000, at the age of 67 in Beijing.

Party political offices
Preceded by Wang Enmao	Communist Party Secretary of the Xinjiang Uyghur Autonomous Region; 1985–1994	Succeeded by Wang Lequan
