= He Zhongyou =

Chinese politician

- 何忠友

Political Commissar of the Xinjiang Production and Construction Corps
- Incumbent
- Assumed office 27 July 2024
- Preceded by: Li Yifei

Communist Party Secretary of Ürümqi
- In office 13 May 2023 – July 2024
- Deputy: Yahefu Paidula (mayor)
- Preceded by: Yang Fasen
- Succeeded by: Zhang Zhu

Communist Party Secretary of Haikou
- In office 5 December 2019 – October 2021
- Preceded by: Zhang Qi
- Succeeded by: Luo Zengbin

Secretary of the Political and Legal Affairs Commission of the CCP Guangdong Provincial Committee
- In office May 2017 – December 2019
- Preceded by: Lin Shaochun
- Succeeded by: Ye Zhenqin

Vice Governor of Guangdong
- In office January 2016 – July 2017
- Succeeded by: Huang Ningsheng (黄宁生)

Communist Party Secretary of Heyuan
- In office December 2011 – January 2016
- Preceded by: Chen Jianhua
- Succeeded by: Zhang Wen

Personal details
- Born: November 1965 (age 60) Wuwei County, Anhui, China
- Party: Chinese Communist Party
- Education: Southwest Jiaotong University; London School of Economics; University of Massachusetts Boston; Central Party School of the Chinese Communist Party

He Zhongyou (Chinese: 何忠友; pinyin: Hé Zhōngyǒu; born November 1965) is a Chinese politician currently serving as political commissar of the Xinjiang Production and Construction Corps and party secretary of the CCP Xinjiang Production and Construction Corps Committee. He previously served as party secretary of Ürümqi and a deputy secretary of the Chinese Communist Party Xinjiang Committee.

He was a delegate to the 18th National Congress of the Chinese Communist Party.

== Early life and education ==
He was born in Wuwei County, Anhui in November 1965. In September 1984 he was accepted to Southwest Jiaotong University, majoring in computer science.

== Career ==
After graduating in July 1988, he was assigned to the Guangdong Provincial Communications Department, becoming its Party Branch Secretary in April 2007 and the head in March 2008. He obtained his Master of Science degree from London School of Economics at the expense of the Communist government in 1996. In 2000 he was sent to study at the University of Massachusetts Boston as a part-time student.

In December 2011 he was transferred to Heyuan and appointed Communist Party Secretary there, he concurrently served as chairman of the Standing Committee of the Municipal People's Congress in January 2012. In January 2016 he was promoted to become vice-governor of Guangdong. He was secretary of the Political and Legal Affairs Commission of the CCP Guangdong Provincial Committee in May 2017, and held that office until December 2019.

On December 5, 2019, he was appointed CCP committee secretary of Haikou and member of the Standing Committee of the CCP Hainan Provincial Committee, replacing Zhang Qi, who was sacked for graft in September 2019.

In October 2021, he was appointed as a deputy secretary of the Chinese Communist Party Xinjiang Committee. In May 2023, he succeeded Yang Fasen as the Communist Party Secretary of Ürümqi. In August 2024, he replaced Li Yifei as political commissar of the Xinjiang Production and Construction Corps and party secretary of the CCP Xinjiang Production and Construction Corps Committee.

Party political offices
Preceded by Chen Jianhua	Communist Party Secretary of Heyuan; 2011–2016	Succeeded by Zhang Wen (张文)
Preceded by Lin Shaochun (林少春)	Secretary of the Political and Legal Affairs Commission of the CCP Guangdong Provincial Committee; 2017–2019	Succeeded by Ye Zhenqin (叶贞琴)
Preceded by Zhang Qi	Communist Party Secretary of Haikou; 2019	Succeeded by Luo Zengbin
Preceded by Yang Fasen	Communist Party Secretary of Ürümqi; 2023–2024	Succeeded by TBA
Preceded by Li Yifei	Secretary of the CCP Xinjiang Production and Construction Corps Committee; 2024–present	Incumbent
Government offices
Preceded by Zhang Yuanyi (张远贻)	Head of the Guangdong Provincial Communications Department; 2008–2012	Succeeded by Zeng Zhaogeng (曾兆庚)
Military offices
Preceded by Li Yifei	Political Commissar of the Xinjiang Production and Construction Corps; 2024–present	Incumbent
