= Peng Jiarui =

Chinese military officer and politician

- 彭家瑞

Commander of Xinjiang Production and Construction Corps
- In office April 2017 – February 2022
- Preceded by: Liu Xinqi
- Succeeded by: Xue Bin

Personal details
- Born: April 1961 (age 65) Wuwei County, Gansu, China
- Party: Chinese Communist Party
- Education: Xinjiang Political and Legal Cadre School; Central Party School of the Chinese Communist Party

Military service
- Allegiance: People's Republic of China
- Branch/service: People's Liberation Army Ground Force
- Years of service: ?–present
- Unit: 2nd Division and 9th Division of the Xinjiang Production and Construction Corps

Peng Jiarui (Chinese: 彭家瑞; pinyin: Péng Jiāruì; born April 1961) is a Chinese military officer and politician currently serving as vice chairman of Xinjiang Uygur Autonomous Region and vice chairman of the Xinjiang Regional Committee of the Chinese People's Political Consultative Conference. He previously served as commander of Xinjiang Production and Construction Corps. He joined the Chinese Communist Party (CCP) in December 1983. He was a representative of the 17th, 18th, and 19th National Congress of the Chinese Communist Party. He is a delegate to the 13th National People's Congress.

== Biography ==
Peng was born in Wuwei County, Gansu, in April 1961. In 1979, he entered Xinjiang Political and Legal Cadre School, majoring in public security. He worked in Changji Hui Autonomous Prefecture after university in 1981, where he eventually became deputy party secretary and vice governor in 2001. In October 2004, he was promoted to become party secretary of Tacheng Prefecture, a position he held until July 2011, when he was appointed party secretary of Bayingolin Mongol Autonomous Prefecture. He was appointed secretary-general of CCP Xinjiang Uygur Autonomous Region Committee in December 2015 and in March 2016 was admitted to member of the standing committee of the CCP Xinjiang Uygur Autonomous Region Committee, the region's top authority. He was made vice chairman of Xinjiang Uygur Autonomous Region in March 2017, concurrently serving as commander of Xinjiang Production and Construction Corps and vice chairman of the Xinjiang Regional Committee of the Chinese People's Political Consultative Conference. On 31 July 2020, the United States government imposed Global Magnitsky Human Rights Accountability Act sanctions and visa restrictions against Peng, together with Sun Jinlong for their connection to similar human rights abuse against the ethnic minorities in Xinjiang. On 10 December 2024, Minister of Foreign Affairs of Canada Mélanie Joly announced Canada's sanctions against Peng and seven other government officials of Xinjiang and Tibet involved in serious human rights violations.

Party political offices
Preceded by ?	Communist Party Secretary of Tacheng Prefecture; 2004–2011	Succeeded by Zhang Bo
Preceded by ?	Communist Party Secretary of Bayingolin Mongol Autonomous Prefecture; 2011–2015	Succeeded by Li Jianguo
Preceded by Bai Zhijie	Secretary-General of CCP Xinjiang Uygur Autonomous Region Committee; 2015–2016	Succeeded by Li Pengxin
Military offices
Preceded by Liu Xinqi	Commander of Xinjiang Production and Construction Corps; 2017–2022	Succeeded by Xue Bin
