= Li Pengxin =

Chinese politician

- 李鹏新

Deputy Communist Party Secretary of the Xinjiang Uygur Autonomous Region
- In office September 2016 – July 2021
- Party Secretary: Chen Quanguo; Ma Xingrui

Personal details
- Born: December 1960 (age 65) Shenchi County, Shanxi, China
- Party: Chinese Communist Party (1984–2024; expelled)
- Education: Qinghai Normal University; Central Party School of the Chinese Communist Party

Chinese name
- Simplified Chinese: 李鹏新
- Traditional Chinese: 李鵬新
Transcriptions
Standard Mandarin
- Hanyu Pinyin: Lǐ Péngxīn

Li Pengxin (Chinese: 李鹏新; born December 1960) is a former Chinese politician. As of December 2023 he was under investigation by China's top graft busters. Previously he served as deputy party secretary of the Xinjiang Uygur Autonomous Region.

He was a representative of the 19th National Congress of the Chinese Communist Party.

== Early life and education ==
Li was born in Shenchi County, Shanxi, in December 1960. After the Cultural Revolution in 1977, he taught at Delingha Farm Middle School. After resuming the college entrance examination, in 1979, he enrolled at Qinghai Normal University, where he majored in Chinese.

== Career ==
=== Qinghai ===
Li got involved in politics in September 1983, when he was appointed an official in Zhidoi County in northwest China's Qinghai province. He joined the Chinese Communist Party (CCP) in September 1984. He was eventually promoted to deputy magistrate in December 1985.

He served as deputy head of the Organization Department of the Qinghai Provincial Committee of the Communist Youth League of China in January 1990, and a year later promoted to the head position. In November 1991, he became deputy secretary of the Qinghai Provincial Committee of the Communist Youth League of China, rising to secretary in January 1997.

He was deputy party secretary of Haixi Mongol and Tibetan Autonomous Prefecture in November 1999, in addition to serving as party secretary of Golmud. He was appointed party secretary of the prefecture in August 2005 and was admitted to member of the CCP Qinghai Provincial Committee, the province's top authority. He was secretary of the Political and Legal Affairs Commission of the CCP Qinghai Provincial Committee in January 2007, and held that office until October 2011.

=== Inner Mongolia ===
He was made head of the Organization Department of the CCP Inner Mongolia Autonomous Regional Committee in October 2011 and was admitted to member of the CCP Inner Mongolia Autonomous Regional Committee, the region's top authority.

=== Xinjiang ===
He was chosen as deputy party secretary of the Xinjiang Uygur Autonomous Region in September 2016, concurrently serving as secretary of the Education Work Committee of the CCP Xinjiang Uygur Autonomous Regional Committee and secretary-general of the CCP Xinjiang Uygur Autonomous Regional Committee.

== Downfall ==
On 11 December 2023, Li was put under investigation for alleged "serious violations of discipline and laws" by the Central Commission for Discipline Inspection (CCDI), the party's internal disciplinary body, and the National Supervisory Commission, the highest anti-corruption agency of China.

On 17 June 2024, Li was expelled from the CCP and dismissed from public office. On June 28, the Supreme People's Procuratorate signed an arrest order for him for taking bribes. On December 11, he was indicted on suspicion of accepting bribes.

On 9 January 2025, Li stood trial at the Intermediate People's Court of Baoji on charges of taking bribes, he allegedly took advantage of his position to benefit organizations on matters related to mineral development, enterprise management, and cadre appointment between 1999 and 2023, when he successively held different posts in Qinghai, in return, he accepted money and property worth over 822 million yuan ($115.4 million) either himself or via his family members. On April 22, he was sentenced to death with a two-year reprieve for taking bribes, and was deprived of his political rights for life, and all his personal assets were confiscated.

Party political offices
Preceded by Xiao Ruihua (肖瑞华)	Communist Party Secretary of Haixi Mongol and Tibetan Autonomous Prefecture; 2001–2007	Succeeded by Luo Zhaoyang
Preceded by Shen He	Secretary of the Political and Legal Affairs Commission of the Qinghai Provincial Committee of the Chinese Communist Party; 2007–2011	Succeeded by Wang Jianjun
Preceded by Li Jia	Head of the Organization Department of Inner Mongolia Autonomous Regional Committee of the Chinese Communist Party; 2011–2016	Succeeded by Zeng Yichun
Preceded by Peng Jiarui	Secretary-General of the Xinjiang Uygur Autonomous Regional Committee of the Chinese Communist Party; 2016–2017	Succeeded by Li Xuejun
Preceded by Liang Chao	Secretary of the Education Work Committee of the Xinjiang Uygur Autonomous Region Committee of the Chinese Communist Party; 2016–2021	Succeeded by Li Yifei
Civic offices
Preceded by Deng Bentai	Secretary of the Qinghai Provincial Committee of the Communist Youth League of China; 1997–1999	Succeeded by Nima Zhuoma
