= Zhang Chunxian =

Chinese politician (born 1953)

- 张春贤

Vice Chairman of the Standing Committee of the National People's Congress
- In office 17 March 2018 – 10 March 2023
- Chairman: Li Zhanshu

Party Secretary of Xinjiang
- In office 24 April 2010 – 29 August 2016
- Deputy: Nur Bekri (2010–14); Shohrat Zakir (2014–16)
- General Secretary: Hu Jintao; Xi Jinping
- Preceded by: Wang Lequan
- Succeeded by: Chen Quanguo

Personal details
- Born: May 1953 (age 72) Yuzhou, Henan, China
- Party: Chinese Communist Party (since 1973)
- Education: Northeast Heavy Machinery College; Harbin Institute of Technology

Zhang Chunxian
- Simplified Chinese: 张春贤
- Traditional Chinese: 張春賢
Transcriptions
Standard Mandarin
- Hanyu Pinyin: Zhāng Chūnxián

Zhang Chunxian (Chinese: 张春贤; pinyin: Zhāng Chūnxián; born 12 May 1953) is a Chinese politician best known for his term as the Party Secretary of Xinjiang from 2010 to 2016. From 2005 to 2010 he was the Party Secretary of Hunan Province.

== Early life ==
Born into an ordinary family in Yuzhou, Henan province, Zhang joined the military at the age of 17. After four years in the army, he went back to his hometown to work on a farm. He then went to school at the Northeastern Heavy Machinery Institute (now Yanshan University).

== Career ==
After graduating, he obtained a state-assigned job at the No. 3 Machinery Ministry, working as an aerospace engineering technician. At a research institute under the ministry, Zhang quickly made a name for himself and rose through the ranks, eventually becoming leader of the institute. In 1991, he was identified as a young talent by the party organization. He was transferred to Beijing to work for the Ministry of Supervision, then was transferred to the China National Food and Packaging Machinery Corporation to serve as chief executive.

In August 1995, Zhang was sent to Yunnan province to become assistant to the governor, then vice-governor, overseeing science and technology. Two years later, Zhang headed back to Beijing to serve as deputy minister, and later minister, of transport from 1998 to 2005.

In 2005, Zhang became the Chinese Communist Party Committee Secretary of Hunan province. In 2006, Zhang simultaneously took on the role of chairman of the Hunan Provincial People's Congress.

He has been a member of the 16th, 17th and 18th Central Committees. He was elected to the 18th Politburo of the Chinese Communist Party in 2012.

=== Xinjiang ===
Zhang replaced Wang Lequan as secretary of the Communist Party Committee of the Xinjiang Uyghur Autonomous Region in April 2010 and was replaced by Zhou Qiang in his role as secretary of the Communist Party and chairman of the provincial People's Congress. Zhang was credited with bringing bus rapid transit (BRT) to Urumqi's major thoroughfares, the construction of the Xinjiang International Convention Centre, and the resumption of internet connections in the region following a one-year long ban in the aftermath of the July 2009 Ürümqi riots.

After Zhang departed Xinjiang, he was named the deputy leader of the Leading Group for Party Building, a group headed by Liu Yunshan. Political analysts noted that his involvement in party cohesion and organization was a promotion, possibly even an indication that he would be groomed to take on a more substantial party affairs role following the 19th Party Congress. His first public appearance as part of the Party Building group was a visit to the Communist revolutionary heartland of Yan'an. However, other observers have interpreted the move more pessimistically, noting that it in fact mirrors Wang Lequan's own departure from Xinjiang six years earlier when he was given a seemingly token role as a deputy to then security-tsar Zhou Yongkang. Zhang was considered a candidate for ascension to the Politburo Standing Committee at the Congress in 2017, but ultimately did not make the cut. He relinquished his Politburo membership in 2017 but maintained his Central Committee membership.

=== Post-Xinjiang career ===
On March 17, 2018, Zhang was elected as a vice chairman of the Standing Committee of the National People's Congress.

On 7 December 2020, pursuant to Executive Order 13936, the US Department of the Treasury imposed sanctions on all 14 Vice Chairpersons of the NPC, including Zhang, for "undermining Hong Kong's autonomy and restricting the freedom of expression or assembly."

== Personal life ==
Zhang is known for his use of a popular microblog service supported by Tencent, which spiked in usage during the 2011 National People's Congress. He was the highest-ranking Chinese official of his generation to maintain a microblog.

Government offices
Preceded by Huang Zhendong	Minister of Transport; 2002–2005	Succeeded by Li Shenglin
Political offices
Preceded by Yang Zhengwu	Secretary of the Hunan CPC Committee; 2005–2010	Succeeded by Zhou Qiang
Preceded by Yang Zhengwu	Chairman of Hunan People's Congress Standing Committee; 2006–2010	Succeeded by Zhou Qiang
Preceded by Wang Lequan	Party Secretary of Xinjiang; 2010–2016	Succeeded by Chen Quanguo
