= Zhang Qi (politician, born 1961) =

Chinese politician

- 张琦

Communist Party Secretary of Haikou
- In office November 2016 – September 2019
- Preceded by: Sun Xinyang
- Succeeded by: He Zhongyou

Communist Party Secretary of Sanya
- In office October 2014 – November 2016
- Preceded by: Jiang Sixian
- Succeeded by: Yan Zhaojun

Communist Party Secretary of Danzhou
- In office February 2010 – October 2014
- Preceded by: Ding Shanqing
- Succeeded by: Yan Zhaojun

Mayor of Danzhou
- In office August 2008 – February 2010
- Preceded by: Guo Quanmao
- Succeeded by: Li Jianghua

Personal details
- Born: March 1961 (age 65) Shou County, Anhui, China
- Party: Chinese Communist Party (1983–2020; expelled)
- Spouse: Qian Ling
- Education: Hainan Normal University

Chinese name
- Traditional Chinese: 張琦
- Simplified Chinese: 张琦
Transcriptions
Standard Mandarin
- Hanyu Pinyin: Zhāng Qí

Zhang Qi (Chinese: 张琦; born March 1961) is a former Chinese politician who spent most of his career in Hainan province. He was investigated by the Central Commission for Discipline Inspection and the National Supervisory Commission, the highest anti-corruption agency of China, in September 2019. Previously he served as Chinese Communist Party Committee Secretary of Haikou, capital of Hainan province. Zhang is the first senior official who was placed under investigation in Hainan since the 19th National Congress of the Chinese Communist Party (CCP) in late 2017 and the fourth incumbent provincial level official was sacked for graft since then.

== Early life and education ==
Zhang was born in Shou County, Anhui, in March 1961. After the Resumption of College Entrance Examination, he was accepted to Hainan Normal University, where he majored in mathematics. After graduation, he worked as secretary of Communist Youth League of China there.

== Career ==
In October 1991, he was transferred to Haikou, capital of Hainan province, and became an official in Hainan Provincial Government. In February 2003 he was promoted to become vice-mayor of Haikou, a position he held until May 2006, when he was appointed head of Hainan Provincial Tourism Bureau. He was mayor and Chinese Communist Party Deputy Committee Secretary of Danzhou in August 2008, and 14 months later promoted to CCP committee secretary. He became the Party chief of Sanya in October 2014, and served until November 2016. He was CCP committee secretary of Haikou in November 2016, and held that office until September 2019, when he was placed under investigation by the Central Commission for Discipline Inspection (CCDI), the CCP's internal disciplinary body, and the National Supervisory Commission, the highest anti-corruption agency of China.

== Investigation and arrest ==
In September 2019, he was investigated for "suspected serious violations of disciplinary rules and laws" by the Central Commission for Discipline Inspection (CCDI), and the National Supervisory Commission. Police found 13.5 tonnes of gold hidden in his home during an anti-corruption raid. In addition to the gold, inspectors also discovered 268 billion yuan (£30 billion) in suspected bribes in his bank account, which would make him the richest man in China.

On March 4, 2020, Zhang has been expelled from the CCP and dismissed from public offices. On July 9, his trial was held at the Intermediate People's Court of Guangzhou. On December 3, the Intermediate People's Court of Guangzhou sentenced him to life in prison for accepting bribes. Qi was also stripped of all of his assets and permanently deprived of his political rights. Under Chinese law, Qi will likely also have to perform prison labor. The court said that Zhang Qi was found to have illegally accepted money and gifts amounting to over 107 million yuan (16.3 million U.S. dollars) while holding various CCP and government positions between 2005 and 2019, abusing his positions to help organizations and individuals in areas such as land development and project contracting. His subordinates, Wang Tieming (王铁明), Lan Wenquan (蓝文全), Zhu Yongsheng (朱永盛), and Deng Min (邓敏) were sacked for graft before he stepped down in September 2019.

== Personal life ==
Zhang married Qian Ling (钱玲), who is a businesswoman.

Government offices
Preceded by Guo Quanmao (郭全茂)	Mayor of Danzhou; 2008–2010	Succeeded by Li Jianghua (李江华)
Party political offices
Preceded by Ding Shanqing (丁尚清)	Communist Party Secretary of Danzhou; 2010–2014	Succeeded by Yan Zhaojun (严朝君)
Preceded by Jiang Sixian (姜斯宪)	Communist Party Secretary of Sanya; 2014–2016	Succeeded by Yan Zhaojun (严朝君)
Preceded by Sun Xinyang (孙新阳)	Communist Party Secretary of Haikou; 2016–2019	Succeeded by He Zhongyou
