= Asqat Kerimbay =

Chinese politician (born 1947)

Chairman of the Xinjiang Uygur Autonomous Regional Committee of the Chinese People's Political Consultative Conference
- In office January 2003 – January 2013
- Preceded by: Janabil
- Succeeded by: Nurlan Abilmazhinuly

Governor of Ili Kazakh Autonomous Prefecture
- In office May 1988 – January 1993
- Preceded by: Diyar Kurmash
- Succeeded by: Bekmukhamet Musauly

Personal details
- Born: November 1947 (age 78) Yining, Xinjiang
- Party: Chinese Communist Party

Chinese name
- Chinese: 艾斯海提·克里木拜
Transcriptions
Standard Mandarin
- Hanyu Pinyin: Aìsīhǎití Kèlǐmùbà

Kazakh name
- Kazakh: اسقات كەرىمباي ۇلى; Асқат Керімбай; Asqat Kerımbai

Asqat Kerimbay (Kazakh: اسقات كەرىمباي ۇلى; Chinese: 艾斯海提·克里木拜; pinyin: Aìsīhǎití Kèlǐmùbà; born November 1947) is a Chinese politician of Kazakh ethnicity. He was born in 1947 in Yining, Xinjiang Uygur Autonomous Region. He graduated from Xinjiang University and joined the Chinese Communist Party in 1975.

Political offices
| Preceded by Janabil | Chairman of CPPCC Xinjiang Committee; 2003 –2013 | Succeeded by Nurlan Abilmazhinuly |
