= Yang Xin (politician) =

Chinese politician (born 1950)

- 杨信

Chairman of Standing Committee of Qiqihar Municipal People's Congress
- In office February 2009 – January 2012
- Preceded by: Fan Guangju
- Succeeded by: Hao Huilong

Communist Party Secretary of Qiqihar
- In office June 2003 – February 2009
- Preceded by: Fan Guangju
- Succeeded by: Hao Huilong

Mayor of Qiqihar
- In office August 2000 – June 2003
- Preceded by: Li Zhendong
- Succeeded by: Lin Xiushan

Mayor of Daqing
- In office November 1997 – March 2000
- Preceded by: Qian Dihua
- Succeeded by: Wang Zhibin

Personal details
- Born: May 1950 (age 76) Suihua, Heilongjiang, China
- Party: Chinese Communist Party (1969–2015; expelled)
- Spouse: Li Lihua
- Education: Central Party School of the Chinese Communist Party; Harbin Normal University

Chinese name
- Traditional Chinese: 楊信
- Simplified Chinese: 杨信
Transcriptions
Standard Mandarin
- Hanyu Pinyin: Yáng Xìn

Yang Xin (Chinese: 杨信; born May 1950) is a former Chinese politician from Heilongjiang Province. He was the Party Secretary and Mayor of Qiqihar, and prior to that Mayor of Daqing. In September 2014 Yang was investigated by the Communist Party's anti-corruption body.

== Early life and education ==
Yang Xin was born and raised in Suihua, Heilongjiang. He graduated from Central Party School of the Chinese Communist Party and Harbin Normal University, majoring in economic management.

== Career ==
Yang entered the workforce in November 1968 and joined the Chinese Communist Party (CCP) in September 1969.

Beginning in 1968, Yang served in several posts in Suihua County, including director of organization department.

From August 1980 to May 1983, he worked in Qinggang County, he served as Vice County Governor between August 1982 to May 1983.

He became the Deputy CCP Party Chief of Hailun County in April 1985, and served until April 1986.

In August 1986 he was promoted to become the CCP Party Chief of Qing'an County, a position he held until July 1989.

In November 1992, he was transferred to Daqing as Vice-Mayor, then he served as Executive Vice-Mayor, Deputy CCP Party Chief, and Mayor.

In March 2000, he worked in Harbin, capital of Heilongjiang, he served as the Director of Heilongjiang Provincial Agriculture Committee, he remained in that position until August 2000, when he was transferred to Qiqihar and appointed the Deputy CCP Party Chief, Mayor and Party Secretary, he was re-elected in February 2001, and began his third term in March 2003.

In June 2003, he was promoted to become the CCP Party Chief and Chairman of Standing Committee of Qiqihar Municipal People's Congress, he was re-elected in December 2009.

From February 2010 to January 2012, he served as the Chairman of Standing Committee of Qiqihar Municipal People's Congress.

== Downfall ==
On September 25, 2014, the state media reported that he was being investigated by the Central Commission for Discipline Inspection for "serious violations of laws and regulations".

In November 2015, he was expelled from the CCP.

On January 29, 2016, he was eventually sentenced to a 15-year jail and fined 5 million yuan for taking bribes. The court found that Yang's family property and expenses amounted to about 303.6 million yuan ($46.94 million), including 46 houses, shares of Longjiang Bank worth more than 20 million yuan and bank deposits of more than 90 million yuan. His illegal gains will be confiscated.

== Personal life ==
Yang married Li Lihua (李丽华).

Government offices
| Preceded by Qian Dihua (钱棣华) | Mayor of Daqing; 1997–2000 | Succeeded by Wang Zhibin (王志斌) |
| Preceded by Li Zhendong (李振东) | Mayor of Qiqihar; 2000–2003 | Succeeded by Lin Xiushan (林秀山) |
Party political offices
| Preceded by Fan Guangju (范广举) | Communist Party Secretary of Qiqihar; 2003–2009 | Succeeded by Hao Huilong (郝会龙) |
