= Nurlan Abilmazhinuly =

Chinese politician (born 1962)

- 努尔兰·阿不都满金; نۇرلان ٴابىلماجىن ۇلى
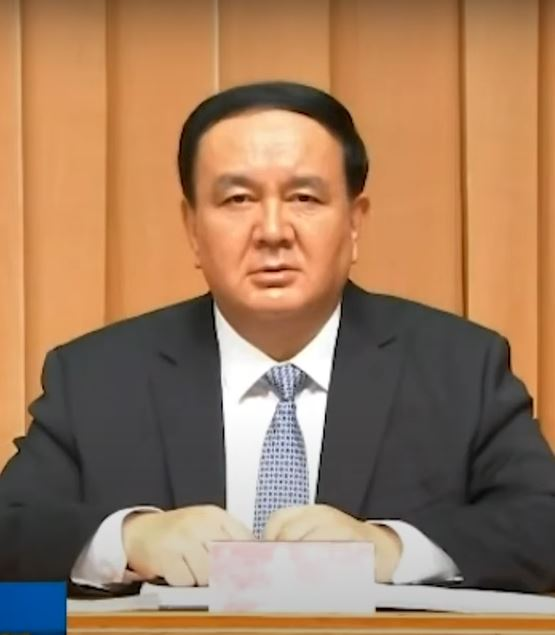
- Nurlan in 2022

Chairman of the Xinjiang Uygur Autonomous Regional Committee of the Chinese People's Political Consultative Conference
- Incumbent
- Assumed office January 2013
- Preceded by: Asqat Kerimbay

Governor of Ili Kazakh Autonomous Prefecture
- In office February 2002 – January 2003
- Preceded by: Alpysbai Rakhimuly
- Succeeded by: Kyzaizhan Seilkozhauly

Personal details
- Born: December 1962 (age 63) Huocheng County, Xinjiang, China
- Party: Chinese Communist Party
- Education: Xinjiang University; Beijing Normal University

Chinese name
- Simplified Chinese: 努尔兰·阿不都满金
- Traditional Chinese: 努爾蘭·阿不都滿金
Transcriptions
Standard Mandarin
- Hanyu Pinyin: Nǔ'ěrlán Ābùdūmǎnjīn
- Wade–Giles: Nu^{3}-erh^{3}-lan^{2} A^{1}-pu^{4}-tu^{1}-man^{3}-chin^{1}

Kazakh name
- Kazakh: نۇرلان ٴابىلماجىن ۇلى; Нұрлан Әбілмәжінұлы; Nūrlan Äbılmäjınūly

Nurlan Abilmazhinuly (Note: Kazakh: نۇرلان ٴابىلماجىن ۇلى, romanized: Nūrlan Äbılmäjınūly; Chinese: 努尔兰·阿不都满金; pinyin: Nǔ'ěrlán Ābùdūmǎnjīn) (born December 1962) is a Chinese politician of Kazakh ethnicity serving as chairman of the Xinjiang Regional Committee of the Chinese People's Political Consultative Conference. He is an ethnic Kazakh from Huocheng County, on the China–Kazakhstan border.

He was an alternate of the 18th Central Committee of the Chinese Communist Party and is a member of the 19th Central Committee of the Chinese Communist Party. He was a representative of the 16th and 18th National Congress of the Chinese Communist Party, and is a representative of the 19th National Congress of the Chinese Communist Party. He was a member of the 12th National Committee of the Chinese People's Political Consultative Conference and is a member of the 13th National Committee of the Chinese People's Political Consultative Conference.

== Early life and education ==
Nurlan Abilmazhinuly was born in Huocheng County, Xinjiang, in December 1962. In 1981, he began studying law at Xinjiang University.

== Career ==
He joined the Chinese Communist Party in May 1985. After graduating from law school in July 1985, he became a judge in the Gongliu County people's court. He was eventually promoted to president in March 1987. In January 1992, he became vice president of the Ili Prefecture Branch of the Higher People's Court of Xinjiang Uygur Autonomous Region, rising to president the next year. He served as vice governor of Ili Kazakh Autonomous Prefecture in July 2001, and one year later was promoted to the governor position. He was promoted to vice chairman of Xinjiang in January 2003, concurrently served as deputy secretary of the Political and Legal Committee of the Party Committee of Xinjiang Uygur Autonomous Region. In October 2006, he was promoted to member of the standing committee of the Xinjiang Regional Party Committee, the region's top authority. In January 2013, he was appointed chairman of the Xinjiang Regional Committee of the Chinese People's Political Consultative Conference (CPPCC), succeeding Asqat Kerimbay.

In response to sanctions by Western countries following the human rights abuses in Xinjiang, Nurlan stated at a speech in 2024 that the committee "opposes slander and sanctions by the United States and Western countries" and "will refute inaccurate, negative and harmful remarks to show Xinjiang's new face of openness and self-confidence."

== Notes ==
Government offices
Preceded by Alpysbai Rahymūly	Governor of Ili Kazakh Autonomous Prefecture; 2002–2003	Succeeded by Qızaýjan Seýilqojaulı
Assembly seats
Preceded by Asqat Kerimbay	Chairman of the Xinjiang Regional Committee of the Chinese People's Political Consultative Conference; 2013–present	Incumbent
