= Kunming Medical University =

Medical school in Kunming, China

- 昆明医科大学
- Type: Public
- Established: 1933; 93 years ago
- President: Song Li
- Location: Kunming, Yunnan, China
- Website: https://www.kmmu.edu.cn

Kunming Medical University
- Simplified Chinese: 昆明医科大学
- Traditional Chinese: 昆明醫科大學
Transcriptions
Standard Mandarin
- Hanyu Pinyin: Kūnmíng Yīkē Dàxué

Kunming Medical University, previously known as Kunming Medical College, is a medical school located in Kunming City, Yunnan Province, China.

== History ==
In 1933, Donglu University initiated specialized program in medicine, which was the origin of today's medical education at the Kunming Medical University (KMU). In 1937, with the development of the program, the School of Medicine was established and affiliated to the Yunnan University that was former Donglu University. In 1956, the School became an independent medical school and was named Kunming Medical College, and in 1993 it was listed as one of the key higher institutions in the Yunnan province. In 2012, after the evaluation of the Ministry of Education of China, the college was updated to the university level and was renamed Kunming Medical University. Presently, Kunming Medical University has become the largest specialized medical university in Yunnan province.

== Campus, Organization, Staff ==
The university campus occupies 125.4 hectares (310 acres). It has about 15,000 students, of which more than 1,400 are graduate students. The university has 6,000 staff, and over 1,150 are professors and associate professors.

KMU has 13 schools, offering 15 Bachelor's Degree programs, 34 Master's Degree programs, and 1 Doctor's Degree program. It has 5 research institutes, 9 affiliated hospitals, 9 teaching hospitals, 39 practice hospitals, 9 forensic medicine sites, 6 preventive medicine practice sites, 4 pharmaceutical practice sites, and 2 optical practice sites. All of this provides KMU students a stable studying and practicing environment.

With a collection of nearly 100,000 books, the university library has been designated as Yunnan's Central Sharing Library Network of National Literature. It is also a First-class Repository for China's Medical and Academic Literature. KMU is a National Clinical Medicine Trial Center, and Yunnan Provincial Expert Testimony Center.

The 9 affiliated hospitals of Kunming Medical University have over 9,800 patient beds. Seven of the Affiliated Hospitals are accredited as Level-A Tertiary General Hospitals of China. The First Affiliated Hospital has over 3,000 outpatients per day and is the largest general hospital in the province. The Second Affiliated Hospital of Kunming Medical University is among the "100 best general hospitals of China" and is the center for both human organ transplant and burn treatment in Yunnan. The Third Affiliated Hospital is the largest specialized cancer hospital in the province and houses three provincial cancer research centers. The Affiliated Stomatology Hospital has over 100 dental chairs and uses the most advanced technology available. It is the largest specialized Stomatology Hospital in Yunnan.

Yunnan boasts abundant natural resources with that, KMU is carrying on extensive scientific research on Yunnan's commonly encountered, endemic and frequently encountered diseases, and constantly uses the most advanced technologies for diagnosis and treatment. KMU is involved in several phases of scientific research. This includes basic research, application research and developmental research, involving multiple subjects and multiple specialties. KMU is responsible for large numbers of national and provincial key scientific projects and international cooperation programs. Since 2004, there have been over 800 scientific research won awards on the national and provincial levels, as well as national invention awards, national scientific technology conference awards, and many others. KMU is a leader in the provincial medicine and health field.

== International exchange ==
Kunming Medical University has made remarkable achievements in the area of international exchange and cooperation. It has launched inter-institutional academic partnerships and exchange programs with more than 100 medical schools and institutions in the countries worldwide, such as the US, the UK, India, France, Sweden, Italy, Germany, Australia, Japan, Thailand and Vietnam. It also conferred the titles of honorary professor and guest professor to more than 60 foreign scholars.

== Schools and Institutes ==
- School of Basic Medical Sciences
- School of Clinical Medicine
- School of Clinical Oncology
- School of Stomatology
- School of Forensic Medicine
- School of Nursing
- School of Public Health
- School of Pharmaceutical Science
- School of Humanities and Social Science
- School of Continuing Education
- School of Advanced Vocational Education and Training
- Haiyuan College
- Institute of Health Science
- Institute of Neuroscience
- Institute of Higher Medical Education
- Clinical Skill Training Center
- Yunnan Key Laboratory of Pharmacology for Natural Products
- Biomedical Engineering Research Center
- Scientific Research Center

== Programs ==
=== Bachelor's programs ===
KMU provides Bachelor's programs in 15 fields:

- Clinical Medicine (5 years)
- Stomatology (6 years)
- Clinical Anaesthesiology (5 years)
- Laboratory Medicine (5 years)
- Medical Imaging (5 years)
- Optometry (5 years)
- Forensic Medicine (5 years)
- Preventive Medicine (5 years)
- Nursing (4 years)
- Pharmacology (4 years)
- Public Health Management (4 years)
- Labor & Social Security (4 years)
- Law (Medical Law) (4 years)
- Rehabilitation Treatment (4 years)
- Aesthetic Medicine (4 years)

=== Master's programs ===
KMU provides Master's programs (3 years) in 34 fields:

- Oral Medicine
- Physiology
- Neurophysiology
- Biochemistry and Molecular Biology
- Human Anatomy & Histology and Embryology
- Pathogenic Biology
- Pathology and Pathophysiology
- Forensic Medicine
- Internal Medicine
- Pediatrics
- Neurology
- Psychiatry and Mental Health
- Dermatology and Venereology
- Radiology and Nuclear Medicine
- Clinical Laboratory Diagnostics
- Surgery
- Obstetrics
- Ophthalmology
- Otolaryngology
- Oncology
- Anaesthesiology
- Oral Basic Medicine
- Oral Clinical Medicine
- Epidemiology and Biostatistics
- Occupational and Environmental Health
- Maternal and Child Health Care
- Pharmaceutical Chemistry
- Pharmacology
- Social Medicine and Public Health Management
- Rehabilitation and Physical Medicine
- Emergency Medicine
- Health Toxicology
- Combination of Traditional Chinese Medicine and Western Medicine
- Gerontology

=== Doctorate ===
KMU also provides one Doctorate program (3 years):

- Surgery (includes seven disciplines: General surgery, Neurosurgery, Orthopedic Surgery, Plastic Surgery, Thoracic Surgery, Cardiac Surgery, Burns Surgery)
