= Janabil =

Chinese politician (1934–2024)

Janabıl Symağūlūly
- Жанабіл Сымағұлұлы

Chairman of the Xinjiang Regional Committee of the Chinese People's Political Consultative Conference
- In office January 1993 – January 2003
- Preceded by: Ba Dai
- Succeeded by: Ashat Kerimbay

Personal details
- Born: April 1934 Kaba County, Xinjiang Province, China
- Died: 22 November 2024 (aged 90) Ürümqi, Xinjiang, China
- Party: Chinese Communist Party

Janabıl Symağūlūly (Kazakh: Жанабіл Сымағұлұлы; Chinese: 贾那布尔·司马胡里; pinyin: Jiǎnàbù'ěr·Sīmǎhúlǐ; April 1934 – 22 November 2024) was a Chinese politician of Kazakh nationality. He was born in April 1934 Kaba (Habahe) County, Xinjiang Uygur Autonomous Region. He died on 22 November 2024, at the age of 90.

Assembly seats
Preceded by Ba Dai	Chairman of the Xinjiang Regional Committee of the Chinese People's Political Consultative Conference; 1993–2003	Succeeded by Ashat Kerimbay
