= Xu Liqing =

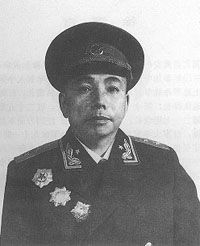
- Native name: 徐立清
- Born: April 5, 1910; Shangcheng County, Henan, Republic of China
- Died: 6 January 1983 (aged 72) Beijing, People’s Republic of China
- Allegiance: Communist China; Republic of China; China
- Branch: Chinese Red Army; People's Liberation Army
- Rank: lieutenant general
- Conflicts: Chinese Civil War; Second Sino-Japanese War

Xu Liqing (Chinese: 徐立清) (April 5, 1910 – January 6, 1983) birth name Xu Yingqing (Chinese: 徐映清), was a lieutenant general in the People's Liberation Army. He was born in Shangcheng County, Henan Province (his birthplace is now part of Jinzhai County, Anhui Province). In August 1929 he joined the Chinese Workers' and Peasants' Red Army and the Chinese Communist Party (CCP) that September. In the Chinese Civil War, he was active in the border region of Hubei, Henan and Anhui. In 1940, he returned to Yan'an, then headquarters of CCP and placed in charge of the Shaanxi-Gansu-Ningxia region.

He was an alternate member of the 11th Central Committee of the Chinese Communist Party between August 1977 and September 1982. He was a member of the Central Advisory Commission between September 1982 and his January 1983 death.
