= Xinjiang Uygur Autonomous Regional Committee of the Chinese People's Political Consultative Conference =

Xinjiang Uygur Autonomous Regional Committee of the Chinese People's Political Consultative Conference 中国人民政治协商会议新疆维吾尔自治区委员会 جۇڭگو خەلق سىياسىي مەسلىھەت كېڭىشى شىنجاڭ ئۇيغۇر ئاپتونوم رايونلۇق كومىتېتى
- 13th Xinjiang Uygur Autonomous Regional Committee of the Chinese People's Political Consultative Conference

Type
- Type: Regional committee of the Chinese People's Political Consultative Conference
- Established: May 1951

Leadership
- Chairman: Nurlan Abilmazhinuly
- Vice Chairpersons: See list: Jërullah Hesamidin; Kong Xinglong; Dou Wangui; Yang Yong; Abdurëqip Tumuniyaz; Nūryn Smayilxan; Ezizi Musa; Liu Huijun; Liu Jianming; Pu Xuemei; Xu Xianyi; Asanjan Axmad; Jin Zhizhen
- Secretary-General: Gao Jianghuai

Website
- www.xjzx.gov.cn

Xinjiang Uygur Autonomous Regional Committee of the Chinese People's Political Consultative Conference

Chinese name
- Simplified Chinese: 中国人民政治协商会议新疆维吾尔自治区委员会
Transcriptions
Standard Mandarin
- Hanyu Pinyin: Zhōngguó Rénmín Zhèngzhì Xiéshāng Huìyì Xīnjiāng Wéiwú'ěr Zìzhìqū Wěiyuánhuì

Alternative Chinese name
- Simplified Chinese: 政协新疆维吾尔自治区委员会
Transcriptions
Standard Mandarin
- Hanyu Pinyin: Zhèngxié Xīnjiāng Wéiwú'ěr Zìzhìqū Wěiyuánhuì

Uyghur name
- Uyghur: جۇڭگو خەلق سىياسىي مەسلىھەت كېڭىشى شىنجاڭ ئۇيغۇر ئاپتونوم رايونلۇق كومىتېتى

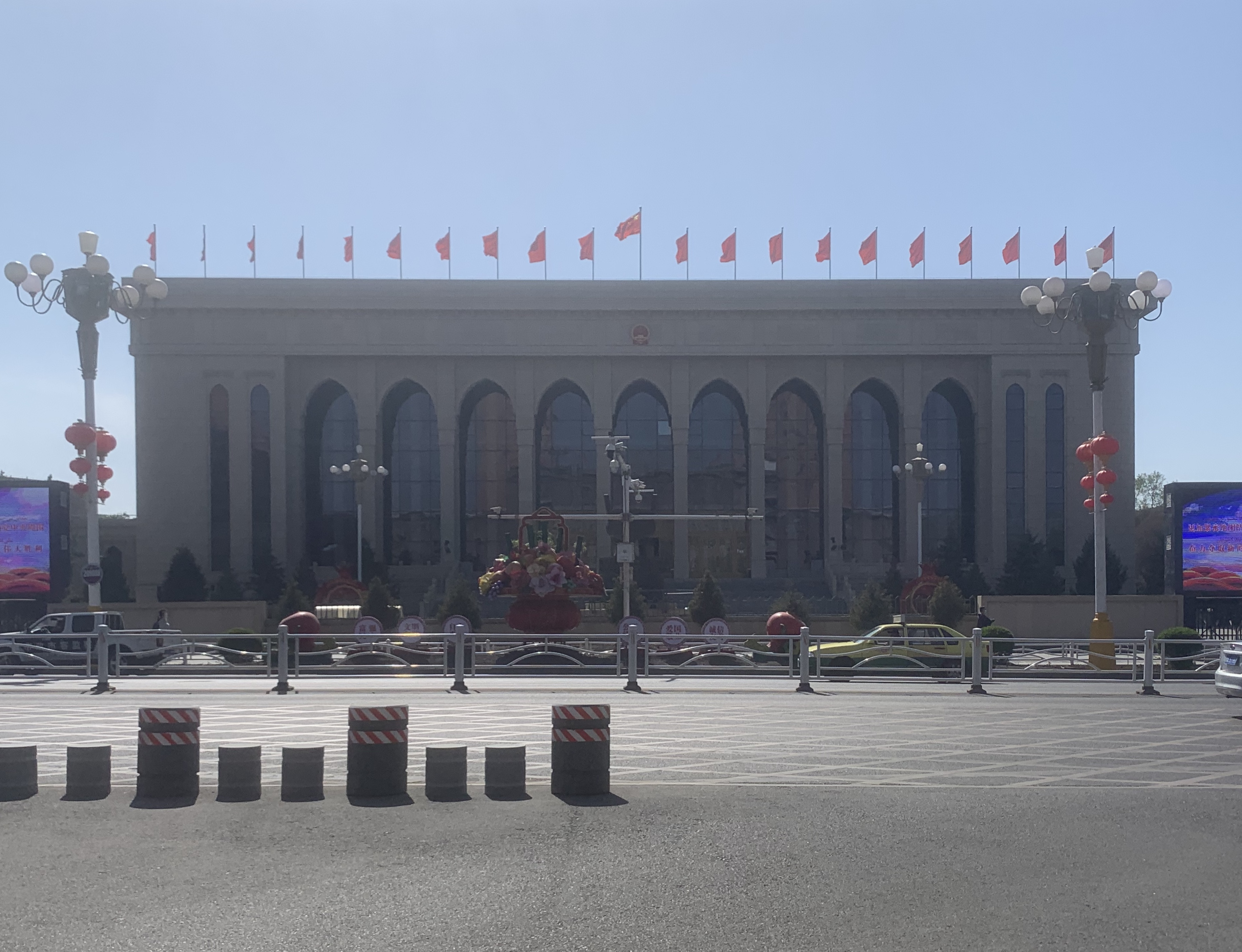
People's Hall of Xinjiang is the venue for meetings of the CPPCC Xinjiang Uygur Autonomous Region Committee

Xinjiang Uygur Autonomous Regional Committee of the Chinese People's Political Consultative Conference is the branch of the Chinese People's Political Consultative Conference in the Xinjiang Uygur Autonomous Region.

== History ==
In May 1951, the inaugural conference of representatives from various ethnic groups and sectors convened in Xinjiang Province, resulting in the election of the Xinjiang Provincial Consultative Committee, formally establishing the local Chinese People's Political Consultative Conference (CPPCC) organization in Xinjiang. In February 1955, the inaugural session of the Xinjiang Provincial Committee of the CPPCC convened in Xinjiang Province, resulting in the election of the first CPPCC organization, with Saifuddin Azizi as the first chairman. Subsequently, in October 1955, following the establishment of the Xinjiang Uygur Autonomous Region, it was officially reconstituted as the CPPCC Xinjiang Uygur Autonomous Region Committee.
