= List of administrative divisions of Ili =

Ili Kazakh Autonomous Prefecture
- Capital: Yining

Prefecture-level divisions
- Sub-provincial autonomous prefectures: 1
- Prefectures: 2

County level divisions
- County cities: 5
- Counties: 17
- Autonomous counties: 2

Township level divisions
- Towns: 73
- Townships: 124
- Ethnic townships: 17
- Subdistricts: 23
- Other entries: 117
- The other entries are not counted in the Township level divisions.

Ili, an autonomous prefecture of the People's Republic of China located in Xinjiang, is made up of the following administrative divisions.

The following table lists only the prefecture-level and county-level divisions of Ili.

Prefecture level	County Level						
Prefecture level	Name	Kazakh (Arabic script)	Kazakh Latin transcription	Uyghur (UEY)	SASM/GNC official Uyghur transcription	Chinese (S)	Hanyu Pinyin
Direct administration Ili Kazakh; Autonomous; Prefecture ىله قازاق اۆتونو مىيالى وبلىسى; Ili Qazaq; Aptonom Oblasti ئىلى قازاق ئاپتونوم ئوبلاستى; Ili K̂azak̂ Aptonom Oblasti 伊犁哈萨克自治州; Yīlí Hāsàkè; Zìzhìzhōu	Yining City	قۇلجا قالاسى	Qulja qalası	غۇلجا شەھىرى	Ĝulja Xäĥiri	伊宁市	Yīníng Shì
Direct administration Ili Kazakh; Autonomous; Prefecture ىله قازاق اۆتونو مىيالى وبلىسى; Ili Qazaq; Aptonom Oblasti ئىلى قازاق ئاپتونوم ئوبلاستى; Ili K̂azak̂ Aptonom Oblasti 伊犁哈萨克自治州; Yīlí Hāsàkè; Zìzhìzhōu	Kuitun City	كۇيتۇن قالاسى	Küytün qalası	كۈيتۇن شەھىرى	Küytun Xäĥiri	奎屯市	Kuítún Shì
Direct administration Ili Kazakh; Autonomous; Prefecture ىله قازاق اۆتونو مىيالى وبلىسى; Ili Qazaq; Aptonom Oblasti ئىلى قازاق ئاپتونوم ئوبلاستى; Ili K̂azak̂ Aptonom Oblasti 伊犁哈萨克自治州; Yīlí Hāsàkè; Zìzhìzhōu	Yining County	قۇلجا اۋدانى	Qulja awdanı	غۇلجا ناھىيىسى	Ĝulja Naĥiyisi	伊宁县	Yīníng Xiàn
Direct administration Ili Kazakh; Autonomous; Prefecture ىله قازاق اۆتونو مىيالى وبلىسى; Ili Qazaq; Aptonom Oblasti ئىلى قازاق ئاپتونوم ئوبلاستى; Ili K̂azak̂ Aptonom Oblasti 伊犁哈萨克自治州; Yīlí Hāsàkè; Zìzhìzhōu	Huocheng County	قورعاس اۋدانى	Qorğas awdanı	قورغاس ناھىيىسى	K̂orqas Naĥiyisi	霍城县	Huòchéng Xiàn
Direct administration Ili Kazakh; Autonomous; Prefecture ىله قازاق اۆتونو مىيالى وبلىسى; Ili Qazaq; Aptonom Oblasti ئىلى قازاق ئاپتونوم ئوبلاستى; Ili K̂azak̂ Aptonom Oblasti 伊犁哈萨克自治州; Yīlí Hāsàkè; Zìzhìzhōu	Gongliu County	توعىزتاراۋ اۋدانى	Toğıztaraw awdanı	توققۇزتارا ناھىيىسى	Tok̂k̂uztara Naĥiyisi	巩留县	Gǒngliú Xiàn
Direct administration Ili Kazakh; Autonomous; Prefecture ىله قازاق اۆتونو مىيالى وبلىسى; Ili Qazaq; Aptonom Oblasti ئىلى قازاق ئاپتونوم ئوبلاستى; Ili K̂azak̂ Aptonom Oblasti 伊犁哈萨克自治州; Yīlí Hāsàkè; Zìzhìzhōu	Xinyuan County	كۇنەس اۋدانى	Künes awdanı	كۈنەس ناھىيىسى	Künäs Naĥiyisi	新源县	Xīnyuán Xiàn
Direct administration Ili Kazakh; Autonomous; Prefecture ىله قازاق اۆتونو مىيالى وبلىسى; Ili Qazaq; Aptonom Oblasti ئىلى قازاق ئاپتونوم ئوبلاستى; Ili K̂azak̂ Aptonom Oblasti 伊犁哈萨克自治州; Yīlí Hāsàkè; Zìzhìzhōu	Zhaosu County	موڭعۇلكۇرە اۋدانى	Moñğulküre awdanı	موڭغۇلكۈرە ناھىيىسى	Mongĝulkürä Naĥiyisi	昭苏县	Zhāosū Xiàn
Direct administration Ili Kazakh; Autonomous; Prefecture ىله قازاق اۆتونو مىيالى وبلىسى; Ili Qazaq; Aptonom Oblasti ئىلى قازاق ئاپتونوم ئوبلاستى; Ili K̂azak̂ Aptonom Oblasti 伊犁哈萨克自治州; Yīlí Hāsàkè; Zìzhìzhōu	Tekes County	تەكەس اۋدانى	Tekes awdanı	تېكەس ناھىيىسى	Têkäs Naĥiyisi	特克斯县	Tèkèsī Xiàn
Direct administration Ili Kazakh; Autonomous; Prefecture ىله قازاق اۆتونو مىيالى وبلىسى; Ili Qazaq; Aptonom Oblasti ئىلى قازاق ئاپتونوم ئوبلاستى; Ili K̂azak̂ Aptonom Oblasti 伊犁哈萨克自治州; Yīlí Hāsàkè; Zìzhìzhōu	Nilka County	نىلقى اۋدانى	Nılqı awdanı	نىلقا ناھىيسى	Nilk̂a Naĥiyisi	尼勒克县	Nílèkè Xiàn
Direct administration Ili Kazakh; Autonomous; Prefecture ىله قازاق اۆتونو مىيالى وبلىسى; Ili Qazaq; Aptonom Oblasti ئىلى قازاق ئاپتونوم ئوبلاستى; Ili K̂azak̂ Aptonom Oblasti 伊犁哈萨克自治州; Yīlí Hāsàkè; Zìzhìzhōu	Qapqal Xibe; Autonomous County	شاپشال سىبە اۆتونوميالىق اۋدانى	Şapşal Sibe avtonomyalı awdanı	چاپچال شىبە ئاپتونوم يېزىسى	Qapqal Xibä; Aptonom Naĥiyisi	察布查尔 锡伯自治县	Chábùchá'ěr; Xībó Zìzhìxiàn
Tacheng Prefecture تارباعاتاي ايماعى; Tarbağatay aymağı تارباغاتاي ۋىلايىتى; Tarbaĝatay Vilayiti 塔城地区; Tǎchéng Dìqū	Tacheng City	شاۋەشەك قالاسى	Şäwesek qalası	چۆچەك شەھىرى	Qöqäk Xäĥiri	塔城市	Tǎchéng Shì
Tacheng Prefecture تارباعاتاي ايماعى; Tarbağatay aymağı تارباغاتاي ۋىلايىتى; Tarbaĝatay Vilayiti 塔城地区; Tǎchéng Dìqū	Wusu City	شيحۋ قالاسى	Şïxw qalası	شىخۇ شەھىرى	Xihu Xäĥiri	乌苏市	Wūsū Shì
Tacheng Prefecture تارباعاتاي ايماعى; Tarbağatay aymağı تارباغاتاي ۋىلايىتى; Tarbaĝatay Vilayiti 塔城地区; Tǎchéng Dìqū	Emin County	ءدوربىلجىن اۋدانى	Dörbiljin awdanı	دۆربىلجىن ناھىيىسى	Dörbiljin Naĥiyisi	额敏县	Émǐn Xiàn
Tacheng Prefecture تارباعاتاي ايماعى; Tarbağatay aymağı تارباغاتاي ۋىلايىتى; Tarbaĝatay Vilayiti 塔城地区; Tǎchéng Dìqū	Shawan County	ساۋان اۋدانى	Sawan awdanı	ساۋەن ناھىيىسى	Savän Naĥiyisi	沙湾县	Shāwān Xiàn
Tacheng Prefecture تارباعاتاي ايماعى; Tarbağatay aymağı تارباغاتاي ۋىلايىتى; Tarbaĝatay Vilayiti 塔城地区; Tǎchéng Dìqū	Toli County	تولى اۋدانى	Tolı awdanı	تولى ناھىيىسى	Toli Naĥiyisi	托里县	Tuōlǐ Xiàn
Tacheng Prefecture تارباعاتاي ايماعى; Tarbağatay aymağı تارباغاتاي ۋىلايىتى; Tarbaĝatay Vilayiti 塔城地区; Tǎchéng Dìqū	Yumin County	شاعانتوعاي اۋدانى	Şağantoğay awdanı	چاغانتوقاي ناھىيىسى	Qaĝantok̂ay Naĥiyisi	裕民县	Yùmín Xiàn
Tacheng Prefecture تارباعاتاي ايماعى; Tarbağatay aymağı تارباغاتاي ۋىلايىتى; Tarbaĝatay Vilayiti 塔城地区; Tǎchéng Dìqū	Hoboksar Mongol; Autonomous County	قوبىقسارى موڭعۇل اۆتونوميالىق اۋدانى	Qobıqsarı Moñğul avtonomyalı awdanı	قوبۇقسار موڭغۇل ئاپتونوم ناھىيىسى	K̂obuk̂sar Mongĝul; Aptonom Naĥiyisi	和布克赛尔 蒙古自治县	Hébùkèsài'ěr; Měnggǔ Zìzhìxiàn
Altay Prefecture ئالتاي ۋىلايىتى; Altay aymağı ئالتاي ۋىلايىتى; Altay Vilayiti 阿勒泰地区; Ālètài Dìqū	Altay City	التاي قالاسى	Altay qalası	ئالتاي شەھىرى	Altay Xäĥiri	阿勒泰市	Ālètài Shì
Altay Prefecture ئالتاي ۋىلايىتى; Altay aymağı ئالتاي ۋىلايىتى; Altay Vilayiti 阿勒泰地区; Ālètài Dìqū	Burqin County	بۋىرشىن اۋدانى	Bwırşın awdanı	بۇرچىن ناھىيىسى	Burqin Naĥiyisi	布尔津县	Bù'ěrjīn Xiàn
Altay Prefecture ئالتاي ۋىلايىتى; Altay aymağı ئالتاي ۋىلايىتى; Altay Vilayiti 阿勒泰地区; Ālètài Dìqū	Fuyun County	كوكتوعاي اۋدانى	Köktoğay awdanı	خْكتْكاَي ناھىيىسى	Koktokay Naĥiyisi	富蕴县	Fùyùn Xiàn
Altay Prefecture ئالتاي ۋىلايىتى; Altay aymağı ئالتاي ۋىلايىتى; Altay Vilayiti 阿勒泰地区; Ālètài Dìqū	Fuhai County	بۋرىلتوعاي اۋدانى	Bwrıltoğay awdanı	بۇرۇلتوقاي ناھىيىسى	Burultok̂ay Naĥiyisi	福海县	Fúhǎi Xiàn
Altay Prefecture ئالتاي ۋىلايىتى; Altay aymağı ئالتاي ۋىلايىتى; Altay Vilayiti 阿勒泰地区; Ālètài Dìqū	Habahe County	قابا اۋدانى	Qaba awdanı	قابا ناھىيىسى	K̂aba Naĥiyisi	哈巴河县	Hābāhé Xiàn
Altay Prefecture ئالتاي ۋىلايىتى; Altay aymağı ئالتاي ۋىلايىتى; Altay Vilayiti 阿勒泰地区; Ālètài Dìqū	Qinggil County	شىڭگىل اۋدانى	Şiñgil awdanı	چىڭگىل ناھىيىسى	Qinggil Naĥiyisi	青河县	Qīnghé Xiàn
Altay Prefecture ئالتاي ۋىلايىتى; Altay aymağı ئالتاي ۋىلايىتى; Altay Vilayiti 阿勒泰地区; Ālètài Dìqū	Jeminay County	جەمەنەي اۋدانى	Jemeney awdanı	جېمىنەي ناھىيىسى	Jêminäy Naĥiyisi	吉木乃县	Jímùnǎi Xiàn
