= Kyrgyz in China =

Turkic ethnic group in Xinjiang, China

中国柯尔克孜族 (Chinese) جۇڭعو قىرعىزدارى (Kyrgyz)

Total population
- 204,402 (2020)

Languages
- Kyrgyz, Central Plains Mandarin

Religion
- Predominantly: Sunni Islam

Related ethnic groups
- Other Kyrgyz, along with Kazakhs in China, Uzbeks in China

Kyrgyz

Chinese name
- Simplified Chinese: 柯尔克孜族
- Traditional Chinese: 柯爾克孜族
Transcriptions
Standard Mandarin
- Hanyu Pinyin: Kērkèzīzú

Dunganese name
- Dungan: Хырхыззў

Kyrgyz name
- Kyrgyz: جۇڭعو قىرعىزدارى; Кытай кыргыздары Kytai kyrgyzdary [qɤ̆ˈtʰáɪ qɤɾʁɤ́staɾɤ́]

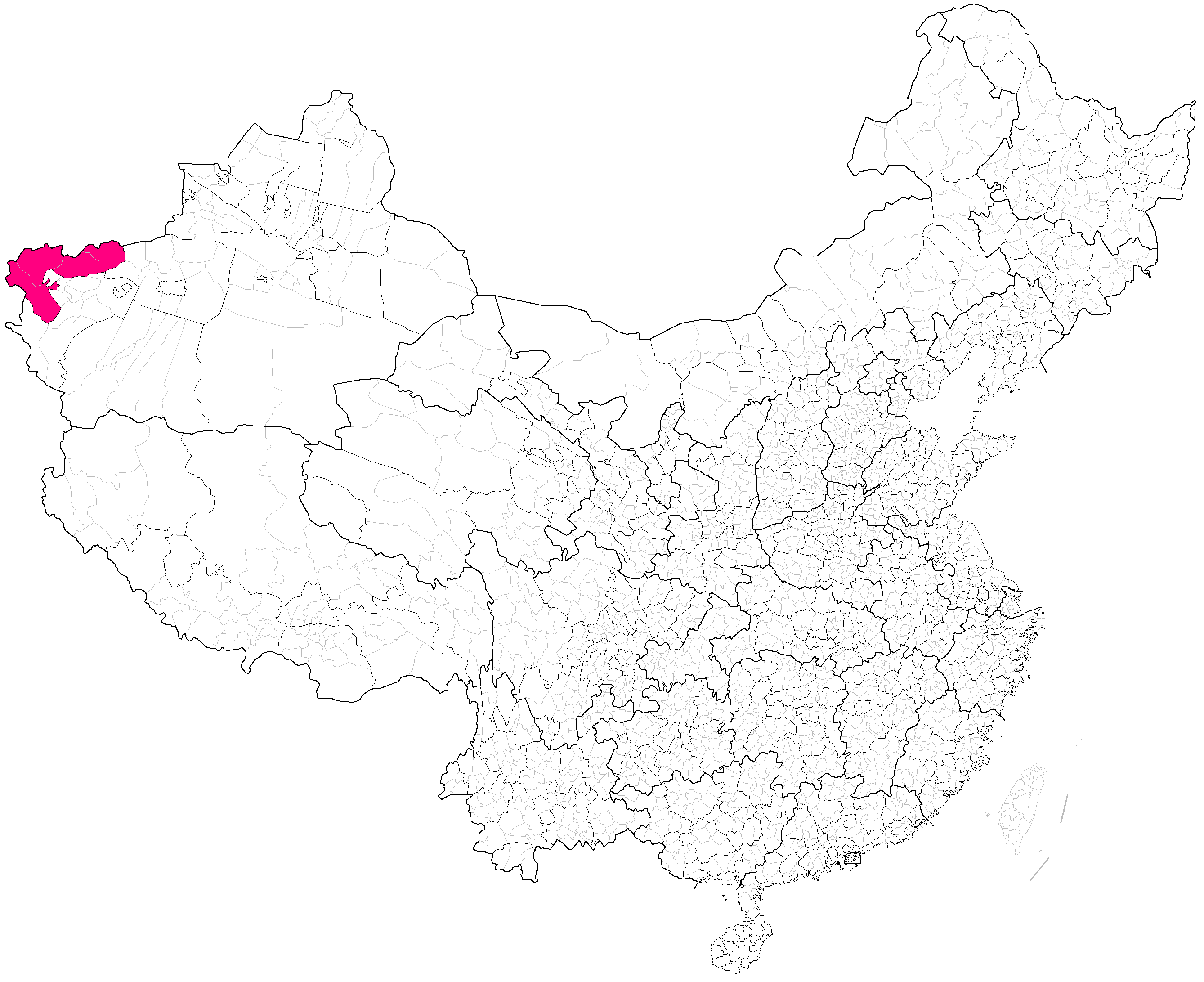
Kyrgyz autonomous prefectures and counties in China.

The Kyrgyz are a Turkic ethnic group and one of the 56 ethnic groups officially recognized by the People's Republic of China. Mainly distributed in Kizilsu Kyrgyz Autonomous Prefecture, in the southwest of Xinjiang Uyghur Autonomous Region, a few Kyrgyz communities reside in neighboring Uqturpan, Aksu, Yarkant, Yengisar, Taxkorgan and Pishan. According to the fifth national census of the People's Republic of China, conducted in 2000, there were 160,875 Kyrgyz people in the country.

== History ==
At the end of the 3rd century BC, The Xiongnu conquered the Kyrgyz ancestors who lived around the Khyargas Lake and were called "Ge Kun". At the beginning of the seventh century AD, the Kyrgyz people were ruled by the Turks and were called "Qigu". After the Tang Empire defeated the Turks, they belonged to the Protectorate of Yanran. Later, it was conquered by the Huihe Khanate, and it was called Xigas. In the 9th century, Xigas gradually became stronger, and in 840 AD defeated and killed the khan Zhugluob, and established the Xigas Khanate in the Tuva area. In the 10th century, with the rise of Khitan, Xigas became its vassal state. In the Yuan dynasty, the Kyrgyz people were called Qierjisi or Jilijisi. At the end of the 16th century, the Junggar tribe in Mongolia gradually became stronger, and at the beginning of the 17th century, most of the Kyrgyz people became the tribes and territories of the Junggar.

The Kyrgyz traditional domain between the expanding Russia and the Qing Empire was gradually attacked by foreign forces, and shrank with the annexation of Russia and the Qing dynasty. In the autumn of 1703, most of the four Kyrgyz tribes of Tuva, Yezer, Aletir and Aletisar in the Yenisei River in Siberia moved to the Issyk-Kul region and the Fergana Basin on the edge of the Qing Empire. and the nearby mountainous areas, the Qing dynasty documents called the Kyrgyz as Brut, and recorded the Kyrgyz tribes as Sayak, Sarbagash, Buku, Hosuochu, Qitai, Salou, Edegna, Monkordoer, Qilik, Baszi, Chongba Gash, Hushqi, Yuevash, Tiyit, Naiman, Shibchak, Neugut, Suletu, etc., The chiefs of the Kyrgyz tribes who belonged to the Qing dynasty were given the tops of the second to seventh grades, which were under the exclusive control of the counselor and minister of Kashgar, and the general Yili sent the leading ministers to inspect once every two years in the area close to Ili.

The attitude of the Kyrgyz towards Russia was initially neutral as their first interaction with the Russian Empire was in the context of the Russo-Kazakh war, before Russia expanded into traditional Kyrgyz territory, the Kazakhs had begun to settle the Kyrgyz A series of raids were carried out, so the Kyrgyz were happy to gain an ally militarily superior to the Kazakhs, especially the Russian raids in the 1850s on the Kokand Khanate, which was hostile to the Kyrgyz clans. But in 1860 Cossacks from the Russian Empire sacked the Kyrgyz city of Bishkek and annexed the area for the Russian Empire, and by 1865 Kyrgyzstan was completely subordinate to Russia.

With the increasing conflict between Russian settlers who move into traditional Kyrgyz lands and nomadic Kyrgyz people, the Kyrgyz people are sure that China will defeat Russia in the coming war due to China's greater benefits to the Kyrgyz people compared to Russia, Many Kyrgyz people moved to China, and Russia also believed that the Kyrgyz people would be the cause of a potential conflict with China, and began to drive the Kyrgyz people to China, causing their population in China to continue to increase. In 1916, in order to avoid purges/massacres by the Russians, about 150,000 Kyrgyz people fled to China on a large scale, moving to Yili in the north, Aksu, Ushi, Kashgar, and Jiashi in the south.

As a tribal alliance composed of various tribal groups, each Kyrgyz tribal group has its own leader. After Xinjiang was established as a province in 1884 and the Kyrgyz area was completely incorporated into the administrative management system in the 1930s, the traditional Kyrgyz nationality The clan and tribal system began to disintegrate gradually, but the influence of tribal concepts and tribal leaders still existed, which was more obvious in pastoral areas. On July 14, 1954, the Kyzilsu Kyrgyz Autonomous Prefecture was announced.

== Culture ==
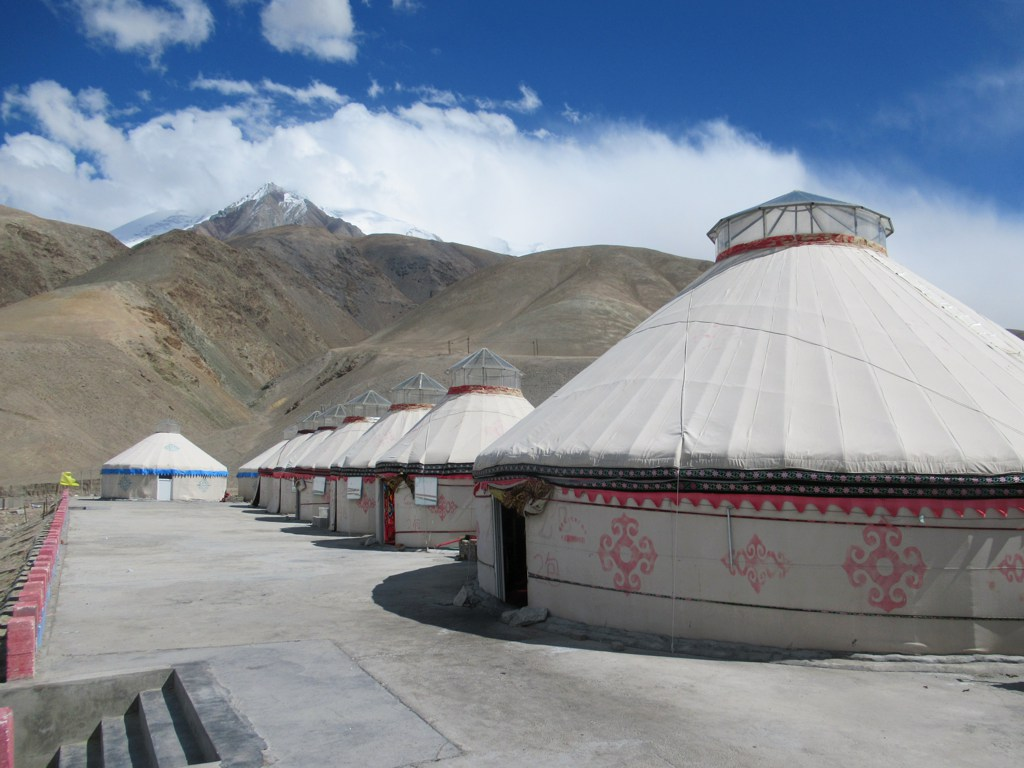
Kyrgyz yurts in Bulungkol

The majority of the Kyrgyz in China are herders, mainly raising camels and sheep. Their language and culture is very similar to the Kazakhs in China. They speak the Kyrgyz language as their mother tongue. The Kyrgyz people living in Aktao and other counties also commonly speak Uyghur. Most of the Kyrgyz in Tekes and Zhaosu speak Kazakh and Chinese while many Kyrgyz who live in Tacheng and Emin often use or combine Kazakh, Mongolian and Chinese.

Common dress for Kyrgyz men includes black or blue sleeveless long gowns made out of camel hair, sheep skin, or cotton cloth (in the summer). This robe is usually worn over a white embroidered shirt and leather trousers. Both genders wear leather boots but women's boots are embroidered as well. Kyrgyz women commonly wear a wide collarless jacket and vest over a long dress. Clothing accessories include leather belts which nomadic Kyrgyz tend to hang a flint (to start a fire) or a small knife on. Women routinely wear silver chains in their hair. Both the men and women wear a small corduroy skullcap which is sometimes placed over a high-topped leather hat. Women occasionally wear a bright headscarf over their cap.

The Kyrgyz people first believed in shamanism. By the 18th century, most of the Kyrgyz adopted Islam, and they combined many elements of shamanism and primitive beliefs.

The traditional handicraft industries of the Kyrgyz include wood ware making, metal processing, textile embroidery, etc. They are also famous for making felt products. There are many kinds of grass weaving, and most of them are made of Achnatherum splendens. The villages in the rural areas are mainly flat-roofed houses with brick and wood structures, and the pastoral areas use white felts to cover the yurts. The epic "Manas" occupies the primary place in Kyrgyz folk literature. The Kyrgyz people call the dance "Biyi", and the traditional musical instruments include Kumuzi, Ozkumuzi, Keyak, Qiuur, Doul, Bas, and Bandaru.

== Notable people ==
- Ishaq Beg Munonov (1902–1949), Kyrgyz military leader
- Perhat Turdi (born 1957), Governor of Kizilsu Kyrgyz Autonomous Prefecture
- Dilshat Kidirhan (born 1966), Governor of Kizilsu Kyrgyz Autonomous Prefecture
- Kyranbek Makhan (born 1992), professional basketball player

== See also ==
- China–Kyrgyzstan relations
- Ethnic minorities in China
- Kyrgyz people
