= Qadan =

Qadan can refer to:

- Kadan, also spelled "Qadan", son of Ögedei, Great Khan of the Mongols
- Qadan culture, ancient culture in Nubia
- Qadan Käbenuly, Chinese politician
- Osama Qadan, technology executive
- Qazi Qadan (1493–1551), Samma dynasty Sufi poet
