= Ili Kazakh Autonomous Prefecture =

Autonomous prefecture in Xinjiang, China

- Autonomous prefecture

Name transcription(s)
  - Chinese: 伊犁哈萨克自治州
  - Uyghur: ئىلى قازاق ئاپتونوم ئوبلاستى
  - Kazakh: ىلە قازاق اۆتونوميالىق وبلىسى
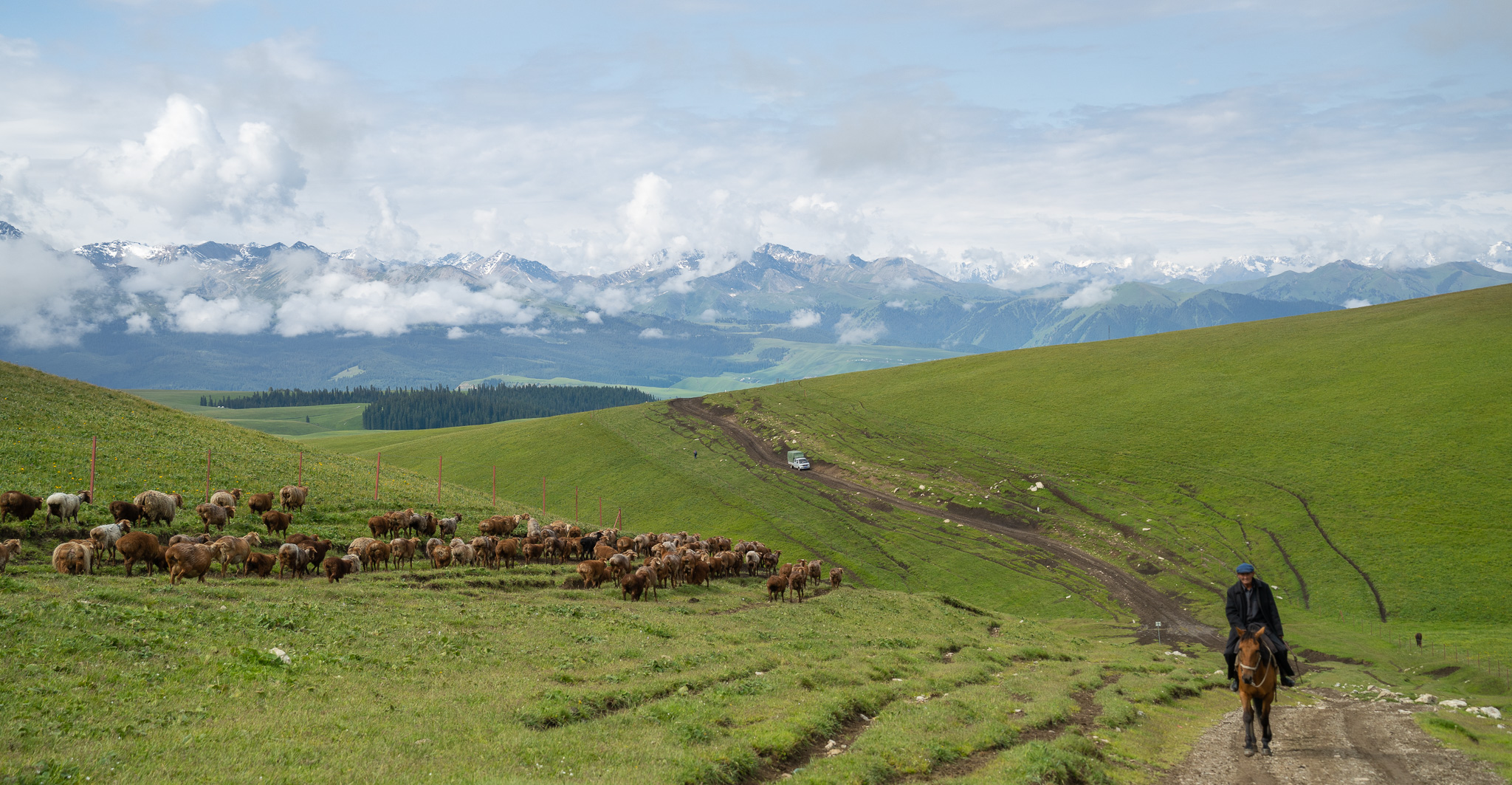
- Kalajun Grassland in Tekes County, with the Tian Shan in the background

- Ili Prefecture (red) in Xinjiang (orange)
- Coordinates: 43.92°N 81.32°E
- Country: China
- Region: Xinjiang
- Capital: Yining

Government
  - Type: Autonomous prefecture
  - Body: Ili Kazakh Autonomous Prefectural People's Congress
  - CCP Secretary: Qiu Shuhua
  - Congress Chairman: Abdussalam Sadiq
  - Governor: Qadan Käbenuly
  - CPPCC Chairman: Serikzhan Orynbai

Area
  - Land: 56,381.52 km^{2} (21,769.03 sq mi)
  - inc. Altay & Tacheng: 268,778.71 km^{2} (103,776.04 sq mi)

Population (2020)
  - Total: 6,582,500
  - Density: 116.75/km^{2} (302.38/sq mi)

GDP
  - Total: CN¥ 222.6 billion US$ 32.2 billion
  - Per capita: CN¥ 47,390; US$ 6,858
- Time zone: UTC+8 (China Standard)
- ISO 3166 code: CN-XJ-40

Ili Kazakh Autonomous Prefecture

Chinese name
- Simplified Chinese: 伊犁哈萨克自治州
- Traditional Chinese: 伊犁哈薩克自治州
Transcriptions
Standard Mandarin
- Hanyu Pinyin: Yīlí Hāsàkè Zìzhìzhōu
- Wade–Giles: I^{1}-li^{2} Ha^{1}-sa^{4}-kʻo^{4} Tzŭ^{4}-chih^{4}-chou^{1}
other Mandarin
- Xiao'erjing: اِلِ هَاصَاكْ ذِجِجِوْ

Dunganese name
- Dungan: Йили Хазах Зыҗыҗу

Uyghur name
- Uyghur: ئىلى قازاق ئاپتونوم ئوبلاستى
Transcriptions
- Latin Yëziqi: Ili Qazaq aptonom oblasti
- SASM/GNC: Ili Kazak aptonom oblasti
- Siril Yëziqi: Или Қазақ аптоном области

Kazakh name
- Kazakh: ىلە قازاق اۆتونوميالىق وبلىسى; Іле Қазақ автономиялық облысы Ile Qazaq avtonomialyq oblysy

Kyrgyz name
- Kyrgyz: ىلە قازاق اپتونوم وبلاسى; Иле Казак автоном облусу Ile Kazak autonom oblusu

Ili Kazakh Autonomous Prefecture (Note: Kazak is the official English spelling of Kazakh in China.) (Note: Chinese: 伊犁哈萨克自治州; pinyin: Yīlí Hāsàkè Zìzhìzhōu; Uyghur: ئىلى قازاق ئاپتونوم ئوبلاستى, romanised: Ili Qazaq aptonom oblasti; Kazakh: ىلە قازاق اۆتونوميالىق وبلىسى, romanised: Ile Qazaq avtonomialyq oblysy) is an autonomous prefecture in northern Xinjiang, China. Its capital is Yining, also known as Ghulja or Kulja. Covering an area of 268,591 square kilometres (16.18 per cent of Xinjiang), Ili Prefecture shares a 2,019-kilometre (1,255 mi)-long border with Kazakhstan, Mongolia, and Russia. There are nine ports of entry in Ili Prefecture at the national level, notably Khorgas. Directly administered regions (直辖区域) within the prefecture cover 56,622 square kilometres (21.08 per cent of Ili's total area) and have a population of 4,930,600 (63.95 per cent of Ili's registered population). Kazakhs are the second largest ethnicity in the prefecture after the Han Chinese, and make up a little over a quarter of the population.

Ili is the only prefecture-level division that has other prefecture-level divisions (Altay and Tacheng Prefectures) under its administration. The term "sub-provincial autonomous prefecture" (副省级自治州) has often been applied to Ili, but the term has no legal basis and is a misnomer.

== History ==
=== Early history ===
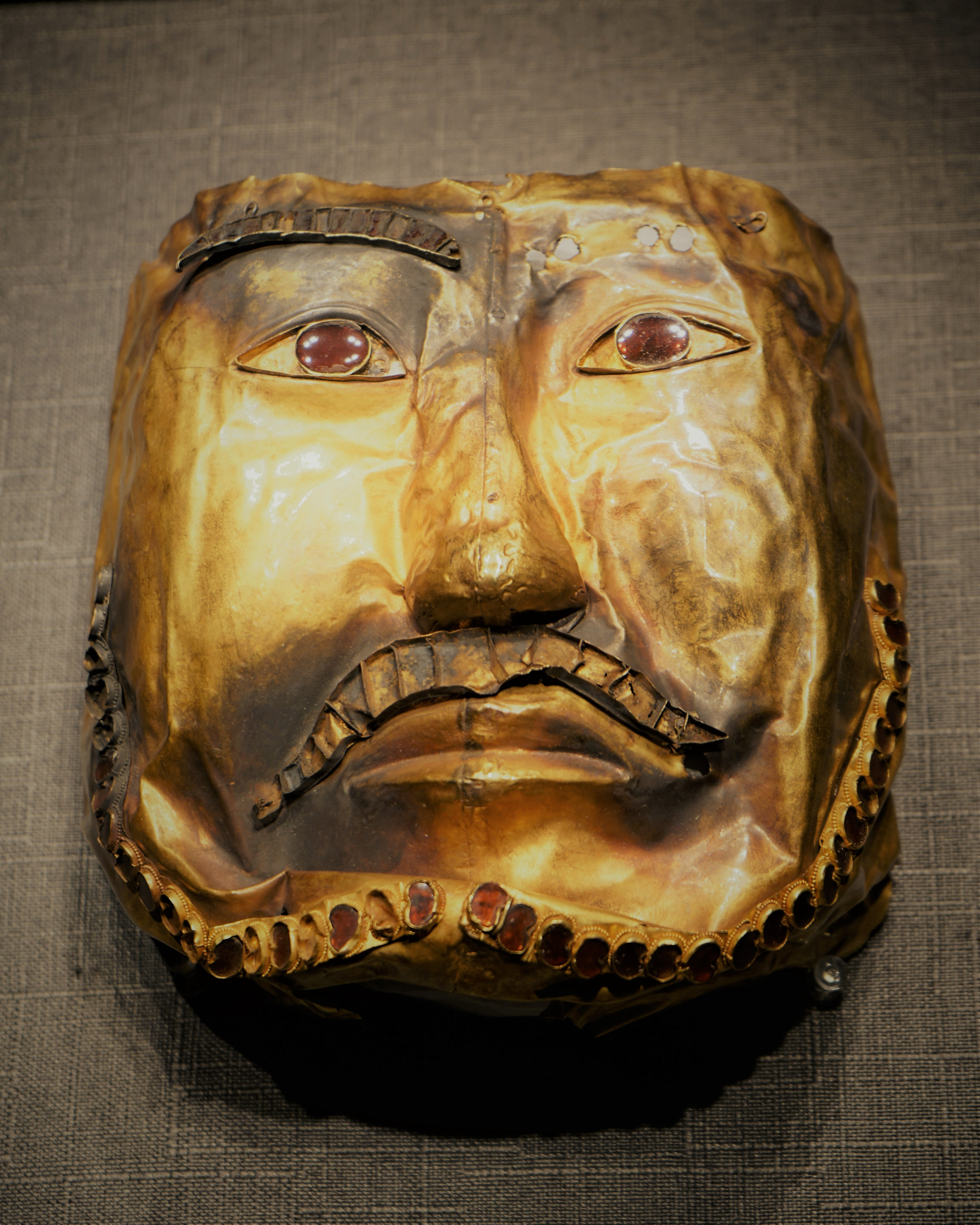
A golden mask inlaid with rubies, likely from the First Turkic Khaganate (552–603). It was excavated at the Boma tomb in Zhaosu County and is a part of the Ili Prefecture Museum's collection.

Before the advent of the Qin dynasty (221 BC – 206 BC), Ili was inhabited by the Wusuns, a tributary tribe of the Huns. The Wusuns were driven away in the 6th century AD by the northern Xiongnu, who established the First Turkic Khaganate in 552. The area later became a dependency of Dzungaria. During the Tang dynasty (618–907), the khanate became the Protectorate General to Pacify the West of the Tang Empire.

Ili came under the control of the Uyghur Khaganate in the 8th and 9th centuries, the Qara Khitai in the 12th century, and Genghis Khan in the 13th century. The Oirats, specifically the Dzungars, conquered Ili at the end of the 16th or the beginning of the 17th century.

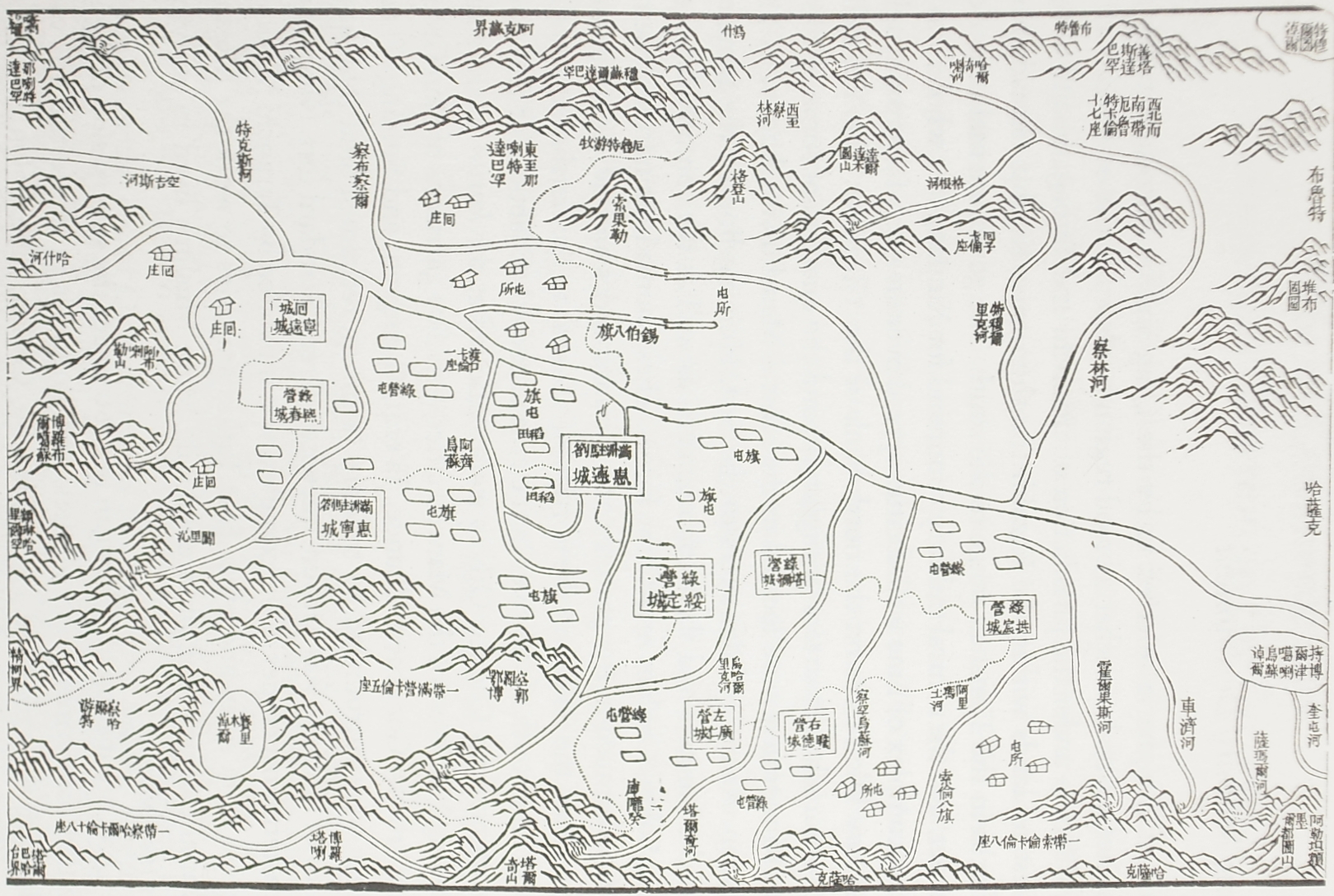
Map of the Ili region, c. 1809. It is "upside down", i.e. the south is on the top and the west on the right. The nine fortified towns are shown as double rectangles.

=== Qing dynasty ===
The Dzungar Khanate controlled both Dzungaria and the Ili basin until 1755, when the region was conquered by the Manchu-led Qing dynasty under the Qianlong Emperor. Having defeated the Dzungars in the Dzungarian and Ili basins, as well as the Afaqi Khojas in Kashgaria, the Qing court decided to make the Ili basin the main base of their control in Xinjiang.

In the 1760s, the Qing built nine fortified towns in the Ili basin:

Original Chinese name	Chinese	Turki (Uyghur) name	Modern name	Notes
Huiyuan Cheng	惠遠城	Kürä Shahr	Huiyuan Town (惠遠鎮) in Huocheng County	Old Huiyuan was the residence of the General of Ili from 1765 to 1866. New Huiyuan was the residence of the General of Ili from 1894 to 1912. Historically known as New / Manchu Kulja or Ili.
Ningyuan Cheng	寧遠城	Kulja (Ghulja)	Yining	Also was known as Old Kulja or Taranchi Kulja. County seat of Ningyuan County (1888–1914) and Yining County (1914–1952).
Huining Cheng	惠寧城	Bayandai	Bayandai Town (巴彥岱鎮) within Yining, some 10 to 18 kilometres to the west of Yining's city centre	
Taleqi Cheng	塔勒奇城	Tarchi	Within Huocheng County	
Zhande Cheng	瞻德城	Chaghan Usu	Qingshuihe Town (清水河鎮) in Huocheng County	
Guangren Cheng	廣仁城	Ukurborosuk	Lucaogou Town (蘆草溝鎮) in Huocheng County, NE of Qingshuihe	
Gongchen Cheng	拱宸城	Khorgos	Khorgas City (霍爾果斯市)	
Xichun Cheng	熙春城	Khara Bulaq	Area commonly referred to as Chengpanzi (城盤子). Located in Hanbin Township (漢賓鄉) within Yining, a few kilometres west of the city centre.	
Suiding Cheng	綏定城	Ukharliq	Shuiding Town (水定鎮), county seat of Huocheng County since 1966	Also known as New / Manchu / Chinese Kulja. Renamed Shuiding in 1965. Residence of the General of Ili from 1762 to 1765 and 1883 to 1894. County seat of Suiding County (1888–1965) and Shuiding County (1965–1966).

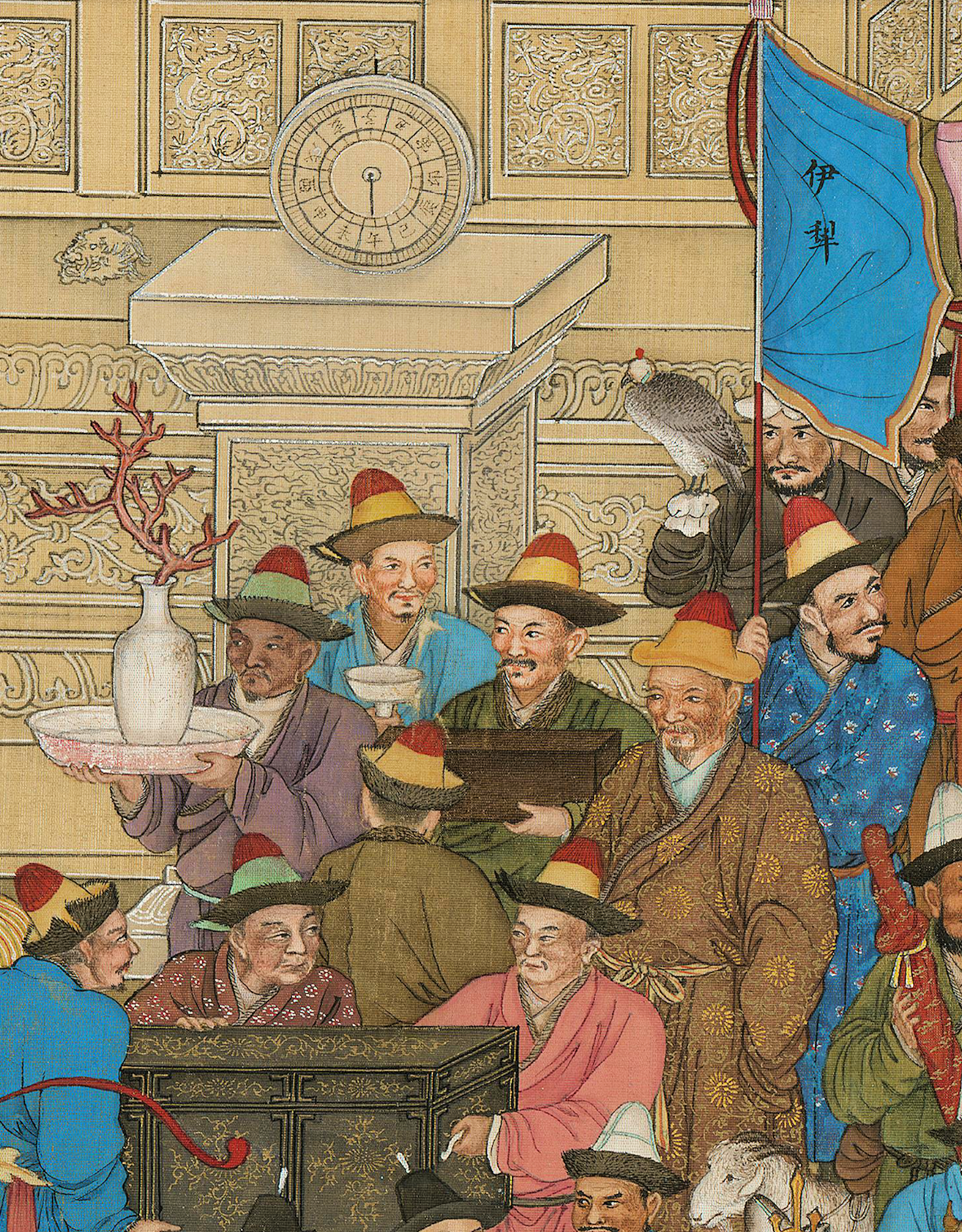
Ili (伊犁) delegates in Peking (Beijing) in 1761. From Ten Thousand Nations Coming to Pay Tribute.

Huiyuan Cheng, as the residence of the General of Ili, the chief commander of Qing troops in Xinjiang, became the administrative capital of the region. It was provided with a large penal establishment and a strong garrison. This city was called "New Kulja", "Manhcu Kulja" or "Chinese Kulja" by foreigners to distinguish it from Ningyuan / Yining, known as "Old Kulja" or "Taranchi Kulja".

The first General of Ili was Ming Rui. The Qing tradition, unbroken until the days of Zuo Zongtang in the 1870s, was to only appoint Manchus as officials in Xinjiang.

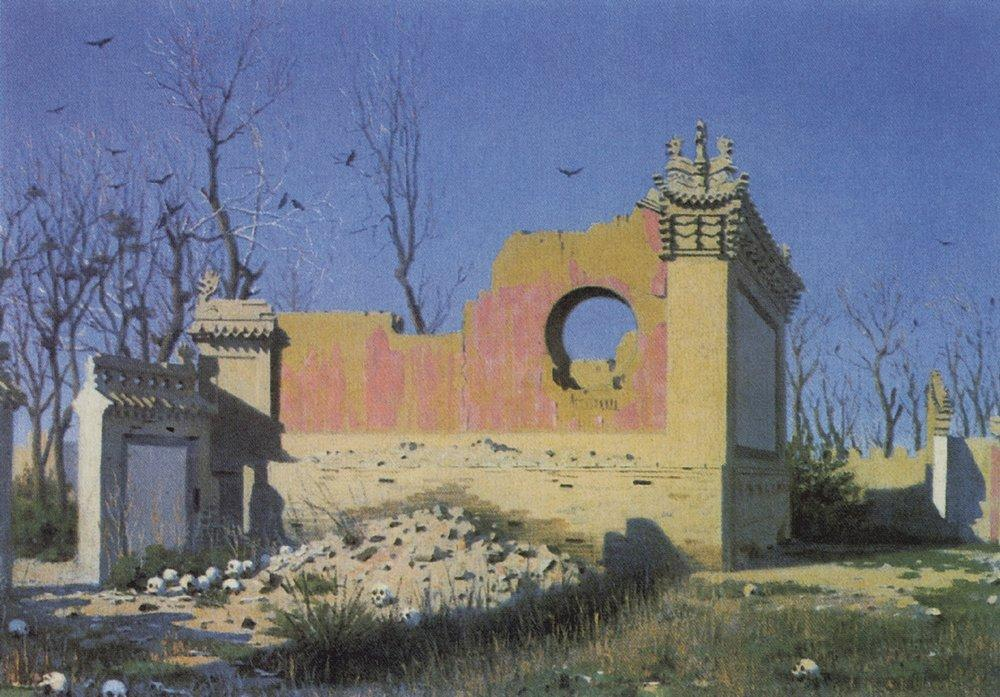
Tacheng (Chuguchak) was among the towns that suffered greatly during the Muslim revolt of 1864.

During the Muslim revolt of 1864, Dungans and Taranchis of the area formed the Taranchi Sultanate. Huiyuan Cheng was the last Qing fortress in the Ili basin to fall to the rebels. The Dungan rebels massacred most of the city's inhabitants; Governor General Mingsioi (Mingxu) assembled his family and staff in his mansion and blew it up, dying under its ruins.

The insurrection led to the occupation of the Ili basin by the Russians in 1871. Ten years later, part of the territory was returned to China in accordance with the 1881 Treaty of Saint Petersburg.

In October 1884, the Qing government officially approved the establishment of Xinjiang Province and the local political system in Ili consequently went through major reforms. The Amban (軍府制) and Baig systems (伯克制) were abolished and replaced by circuit, urban prefecture, prefecture, and county systems. The position of General of Ili was renamed Ili Garrison General (伊犁駐防將軍) and its responsibilities were greatly reduced. The Ili Garrison General would only oversee the military affairs of Ili and Tacheng instead of the whole of Xinjiang, the latter responsibility being delegated to the newly created position of Xinjiang Grand Coordinator (新疆巡撫). The Ili Garrison General was based in Huiyuan Town.

Yita Circuit (伊塔道) was formed in Ili and Tacheng in 1888, as a subdivision of Xinjiang Province. It was headquartered in Ningyuan County (present-day Yining). Yita Circuit was divided into Ili Prefecture (伊犁府), Tacheng Directly Administered Division (塔城直隸廳), and Jinghe Directly Administered Division (精河直隸廳). Altay region was formed from Khovd (科布多; seat in Khovd Town) in 1904.

=== Modern history ===
The Xinhai Revolution broke out on 10 October 1911. Under the leadership of Yang Zuanxu (楊纘緒), a general of the Ili New Army, an armed rebellion against the Qing broke out on 7 January 1912. The rebels occupied Huiyuan Town and killed Zhi Rui (志銳), the Ili Garrison General. On 12 February 1912, the Provisional Government of the Republic of China was established in Beijing, and on 15 March, it ordered the Xinjiang Grand Coordinator, Yuan Dahua (袁大化), to end Qing rule in Xinjiang.

With the end of hostilities between Qing and Republican forces, the position of Grand Coordinator of Xinjiang was abolished and replaced with the position of Military Governor of Xinjiang (都督). Guang Fu (廣福), Zhi Rui's predecessor as Ili Garrison General, was appointed Xinjiang's first military governor. On 25 April, Yuan Dahua was forced to resign as Grand Coordinator of Xinjiang. On 18 May, Yang Zengxin (楊增新) was recommended for the position of Military Governor of Xinjiang. On 8 July, the Qing and Republican governments signed a peace agreement, which stipulated that the position of Ili Garrison General would be replaced by the position of Defence Governor of Ili (伊犁鎮邊使), under the direct supervision of the Republican government in Beijing. Guang Fu was subsequently appointed as the first Defence Governor of Ili. The agreement also recognised Yang Zengxin as the top military and political authority in all of Xinjiang.

In August 1912, the Republican government adjusted Ili's administrative divisions. The Defence Governor of Ili headquarters were established in Huiyuan Town, the Counsellor's (參贊) in Tacheng, and the Business Executive's (辦事長官) in Altay. Yita Circuit (伊塔道) was retained to govern local civil affairs; it was placed under the administration of the Defence Governor.

The position of Ili Defence Governor became vacant after Guang Fu died of illness on 1 February 1914. Yang Zengxin flew to Beijing to petition the Beiyang government (Republican government) to appoint Yang Feixia (楊飛霞) as Guang Fu's replacement. The appointment was approved by Beijing, and the administrative jurisdiction of the position was transferred from the central government to the government of Xinjiang Province. Yita Circuit was then divided into two circuits, Ili and Tacheng, in 1916. The Circuit Governor of Tacheng (塔城道尹) replaced the Counsellor of Tacheng (塔城參贊) with the establishment of Tacheng Circuit.

In 1919, the Beiyang government placed the Altay Chief under the jurisdiction of the government of Xinjiang Province and Ashan Circuit (阿山道) was established from the Altay region. In August 1939, by decree of the Beiyang government, the mingyan (千戶長) and centenari (百戶長) administrative divisions were abolished and replaced with district and township divisions. Kazakh pastoral affairs were gradually integrated into local government services.

Ili Prefecture (伊犁專區) was established in 1943, with 11 counties and Xinyuan Division (新源設治局; present-day Xinyuan County) under its administration. The 11 counties were Yining, Suiding (綏定; part of present-day Huocheng), Khorgas (present-day Huocheng), Gongliu, Tekes, Gongha (鞏哈; present-day Nilka), Ningxi (寧西; present-day Qapqal), Jinghe, Bole, Wenquan and Zhaosu. In December 1953, the Ili Kazakh Autonomous Region was established. It was declared a prefecture-level division under the jurisdiction of Xinjiang Province, with the three prefectures of Ili, Tacheng, and Altay under its administration. Bortala Mongol Autonomous Prefecture was created in July 1954 from the counties of Bole, Jinghe, and Wenquan, three counties of Ili Prefecture. Ili Kazakh Autonomous Region was renamed Ili Kazakh Autonomous Prefecture on 5 February 1955.

During the Yi–Ta incident from March to May 1962, a mass exodus of 14,000 people from Ili Prefecture occurred. Chinese citizens, predominantly Kazakhs, left through the border port of Korgas, driven by deteriorating living conditions in Xinjiang and rumours of Soviet citizenship. To compensate for the loss in manpower brought about by the exodus, thousands of Bingtuan soldiers were relocated to northern Xinjiang from the region's interior. The Chinese government also encouraged the migration of hundreds of thousands of Han Chinese youth from major cities such as Beijing, Shanghai, and Tianjin. By 1969 the number of Han Chinese in Ili Prefecture had reached 1.2 million, outnumbering the number of Kazakhs and Uyghurs combined.

== Geography ==
Ili Kazakh Autonomous Prefecture is located in the hinterland of Eurasia, in the northwest of Xinjiang, north of the Tian Shan. It covers a total area of 268,591 square kilometres, accounting for 16.18 per cent of the total area of Xinjiang. The autonomous prefecture is bordered to the north by Russia, to the east by Mongolia, to the west by Kazakhstan and Bortala Autonomous Prefecture, and to the south by Aksu Prefecture, Bayingolin Autonomous Prefecture, Changji Autonomous Prefecture, Ürümqi, and Shihezi. Karamay is an enclave within Ili Kazakh Autonomous Prefecture.

Chongqing-Xinjiang-Europe Railway, G218 National Highway, G217 National Highway and S316 Provincial Highway pass through the autonomous prefecture. It has a 2,019 kilometre-long international border with nine ports of entry, including Khorgas, Bakhty, and Jeminay. Due to its strategic location in the middle of Asia, Ili Kazakh Autonomous Prefecture has become an important commercial hub and dry port for trade with Europe and the Middle East.

In the autonomous prefecture, there are four types of landforms: 83,632 square kilometres of mountains, 62,989 square kilometres of hills, 102,974 square kilometres of plains, and 20,439 square kilometres of desert. Three major mountain ranges – the Altai, Dzungarian Alatau, and Tian Shan – stand from the north to south, with year-round ice and snow. Friendship Peak in Burqin County is the highest peak of the Altai mountain range, standing at 4,374 metres high. The snow line is 3,000 to 3,200 metres high, the glacier area is 293.2 square kilometres, and the glacier reserves are 16.4 billion cubic metres. The peaks of the Dzungarian Alatau are 3,500 to 3,700 metres high. The snow line of Tian Shan is 3,600 to 4,400 metres high with a glacier area of 3,139 square kilometres, and its glacier reserves are 118.5 billion cubic metres.

== Administrative divisions ==
Ili Kazakh Autonomous Prefecture administers the directly administered, county-level city of Yining; 2 other county-level cities; 7 counties; 1 autonomous county; and the two prefectures of Altay and Tacheng, despite Ili being a prefecture-level division itself.

Districts under direct administration of Ili Prefecture; Tacheng Prefecture; Altay Prefecture											
Part	Division code	Name	Chinese	Hanyu Pinyin	Uyghur (UEY)	Uyghur Latin (ULY)	Kazakh (Arabic script)	Kazakh Latin alphabet Kazakh Cyrillic Alphabet	Population (2020 Census)	Area (km^{2})	Density (/km^{2})
Districts under direct administration of Ili Prefecture			自治州直辖县级行政单位	Zìzhìzhōu zhíxiá xiàn jí xíngzhèng dānwèi	ئوبلاستقا بىۋاستە قاراشلىق رايونلار	Oblastqa biwaste qarashliq rayonlar	وبلىسقا تىكەلەي باعىناتىن اۋداندار	Oblysqa tıkelei bağynatyn audandar Облысқа тікелей бағынатын аудандар	2,778,869	56,522.92	49.16
Districts under direct administration of Ili Prefecture	654002	Yining	伊宁市	Yīníng Shì	غۇلجا شەھىرى	Ghulja Shehiri	قۇلجا قالاسى	Qūlja qalasy Құлжа қаласы	778,047	644	1208.15
Districts under direct administration of Ili Prefecture	654003	Kuytun	奎屯市	Kuítún Shì	كۈيتۇن شەھىرى	Küytun Shehiri	كۇيتۇن قالاسى	Küitūn qalasy Қойтүн қаласы	229,122	1,171	195.66
Districts under direct administration of Ili Prefecture	654004	Korgas	霍尔果斯市	Huò'ěrguǒsī Shì	قورغاس شەھىرى	Qorghas Shehiri	قورعاس قالاسى	Qorğas qalasy Қорғас қаласы	71,466	1,908	37.46
Districts under direct administration of Ili Prefecture	654021	Yining County	伊宁县	Yīníng Xiàn	غۇلجا ناھىيىسى	Ghulja Nahiyisi	قۇلجا اۋدانى	Qūlja aýdany Құлжа ауданы	365,307	4,476	81,61
Districts under direct administration of Ili Prefecture	654020	Qapqal Xibe Autonomous County	察布查尔锡伯自治县	Chábùchá'ěr Xībó Zìzhìxiàn	چاپچال شىبە ئاپتونوم ناھىيىسى	Chapchal Shibe Aptonom Nahiyisi	شاپشال سىبە اۆتونوميالىق اۋدانى	Şapşal-Sibe avtonomiyalyq audany Шапшал-Сібе автономиялық ауданы	157,764	4,469	35.30
Districts under direct administration of Ili Prefecture	654023	Huocheng County	霍城县	Huòchéng Xiàn	قورغاس ناھىيىسى	Qorghas Nahiyisi	قورعاس اۋدانى	Qorğas audany Қорғас ауданы	243,303	3,546	68.61
Districts under direct administration of Ili Prefecture	654024	Gongliu County	巩留县	Gǒngliú Xiàn	توققۇزتارا ناھىيىسى	Toqquztara Nahiyisi	توعىزتاراۋ اۋدانى	Toğyztarau audany Тоғызтарау ауданы	175,766	4,111	42.76
Districts under direct administration of Ili Prefecture	654025	Xinyuan County	新源县	Xīnyuán Xiàn	كۈنەس ناھىيىسى	Künes Nahiyisi	كۇنەس اۋدانى	Künes audany Күнес ауданы	306,525	7,581	40.43
Districts under direct administration of Ili Prefecture	654026	Zhaosu County	昭苏县	Zhāosū Xiàn	موڭغۇلكۈرە ناھىيىسى	Mongghulküre Nahiyisi	موڭعۇلكۇرە اۋدانى	Moŋğolküre audany Моңғолкүре ауданы	146,887	10,427	14.09
Districts under direct administration of Ili Prefecture	654027	Tekes County	特克斯县	Tèkèsī Xiàn	تېكەس ناھىيىسى	Tëkes Nahiyisi	تەكەس اۋدانى	Tekes audany Текес ауданы	148,945	8,066	18.47
Districts under direct administration of Ili Prefecture	654028	Nilka County	尼勒克县	Nílèkè Xiàn	نىلقا ناھىيىسى	Nilqa Nahiyisi	نىلقى اۋدانى	Nylqy audany Нылқы ауданы	155,737	10,123	15.538
↪ Altay Prefecture			阿勒泰地区	Ālètài Dìqū	ئالتاي ۋىلايىتى	Altay Wilayiti	التاي ايماعى	Altai aimağy Алтай аймағы	648,173	117,710	5.51
↪ Tacheng Prefecture			塔城地区	Tǎchéng Dìqū	تارباغاتاي ۋىلايىتى	Tarbaghatay Wilayiti	تارباعاتاي ايماعى	Tarbağatai aimağy Тарбағатай аймағы	1,108,747	94,869	11.69

== Demographics ==
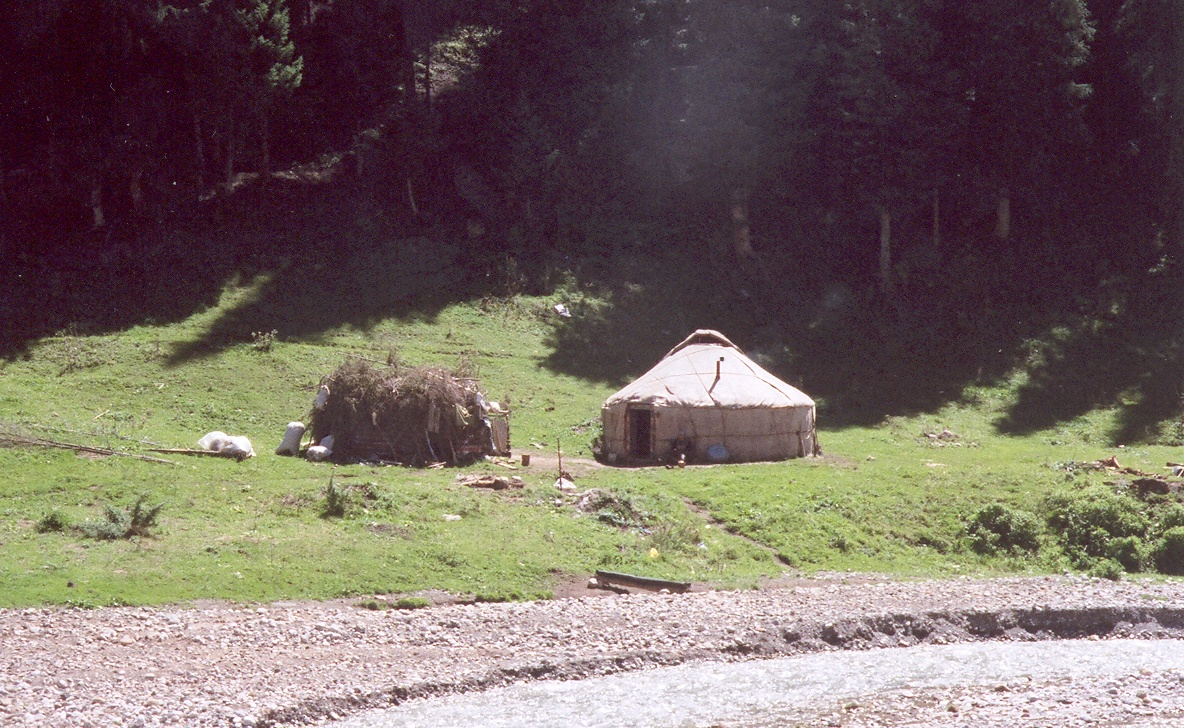
A Kazakh yurt in the Ili basin

Ili is a multi-ethnic autonomous prefecture; there are 13 local ethnic groups: the Han, Kazakhs, Uyghurs, Hui, Mongols, Xibe, Kyrgyz, Uzbek, Manchus, Tatar, Russians, Daur, and Chinese Tajiks. As of 2018, Ili had a population of 4,582,500, of whom 2,745,500 (59.9 per cent) were part of an ethnic minority.

A 2015 report provided the following ethnic breakdown of the population: 1,934,571 Han (41.2 per cent), 1,257,003 Kazakhs (26.8 per cent), 819,701 Uyghurs (17.45 per cent), 433,045 Hui (9.2 per cent), 75,597 Mongols (1.6 per cent), 34,457 Xibe, 22,428 Kyrgyz, 8,298 Uzbeks, 8,298 Daurs, 5,394 Russians, 5,199 Manchus, 2,852 Tatars, 153 Chinese Tajiks and 91,749 "others".

Ethnic breakdown in Ili Kazakh Autonomous Prefecture, 2018
Ethnic group	Percentage
Han	40.1%
Kazakhs	27.2%
Uyghurs	17.9%
Hui	9.3%
Mongols	1.6%
Xibe	0.7%
Kyrgyz	0.5%
Uzbeks	0.2%
Others	2.5%

Ethnic breakdown of cities and counties under the direct administration of Ili Kazakh Autonomous Prefecture, 2018
Ethnic group	Percentage
Han	35.2%
Uyghurs	26.3%
Kazakhs	21.6%
Hui	10.9%
Mongols	1.1%
Xibe	1.1%
Kyrgyz	0.7%
Uzbeks	0.3%
Others	2.8%

Population growth by ethnicity in Ili Kazakh Autonomous Prefecture (1949, 1959, 1969)
Year	Kazakhs	Uyghurs	Han Chinese
1949	361,655	171,823	38,099
1959	427,425(+18.2%)	238,870(+39.0%)	365,250(+858.7%)
1969	471,770(+10.4%)	295,153(+23.6%)	1,196,477(+227.6%)

== Tourism ==
Ili's major tourist attractions include the Narati Grassland, Guozigou Lake, and Kanas Lake. In 2015, Ili saw over 25 million visitors and earned over CN¥19 billion (US$2.92 billion) in tourism revenue.

== Transport ==
=== Road and railway ===
An extensive road network is being built across the prefecture for economic development. In 2015, 66 million passengers travelled on Ili's roads.

The railway has extended to the northern extremes of Altay and the westmost city of Khorgas on the China–Kazakhstan border.

=== Border crossings ===
Ili has nine international ports of entry:

- With Kazakhstan
  - Aqimbek (Chinese: 阿黑木别克) of Altay Prefecture
  - Bakhtu (巴克图), 17 km (11 mi) from Tacheng; another primary point or port
  - Dulat (都拉塔), in Qapqal Xibe Autonomous County: under Ili
  - Jeminay (吉木乃) of Altay Prefecture; another primary point or port
  - Khorgas (霍尔果斯), in Huocheng County; under Ili; a primary Chinese "national" border crossing point or port of entry
  - Muzart (木扎尔特), in Zhaosu County: directly controlled by Ili; another primary point or port
- With Mongolia
  - Khiziltaw (红山嘴) of Altay Prefecture
  - Taskhin (塔克什肯) of Altay Prefecture to Khovd
  - Dayan-Khunshanzyui of Altay Prefecture to Bayan-Ölgii. Only open during Summer.

== Heads ==
=== First Secretaries ===
1. Zhao Tianjie (赵天杰) (2017–2020)
2. Qiu Shuhua (邱树华) (current position)

=== Governors ===
1. Pätіhan (Fathan) Dälelhanūly Sügіrbaev (Chinese: 帕提汗·苏古尔巴也夫; Kazakh: Фатхан (Пәтіхан) Дәлелханұлы Сүгірбаев), November 1954 – June 1955
2. Jağda Babylyqūly (贾和达·巴巴里科夫; Жағда Бабалықұлы), June 1955 – February 1957 Acting Act, from May 1958
3. Qūrmanälі Ospanūly (库尔班阿里·乌斯曼诺夫; Құрманәлі Оспанұлы), June 1958 – September 1963
4. Erğali Äbіlqaiyrūly (伊尔哈里·阿不力海依尔; Ерғали Әбілқайырұлы), September 1963 – May 1969
5. Zhong Liangshu (钟良树; Чұң Лияң Шо), May 1969 – May 1970 (military government)
6. Wang Zhenzhong (王振中; Уаң Жын Жұң), May 1970 – July 1975 (military government)
7. Xie Gaozhong (谢高忠; Шие Гау Жұң), July 1975 – September 1975 (military government)
8. Jänäbil Smağūlūly (贾那布尔·司马胡里; Жанәбіл Смағұлұлы), September 1975 – February 1978
9. Qasymbek Seiіtjanūly (哈生别克·赛依提江; Қасымбек Сейітжанұлы), March 1979 – April 1983
10. Dıar Qūrmaşūly (迪牙尔·库马什; Дияр Құрмашұлы), April 1983 – May 1988
11. Ashat Kerimbay (艾斯海提·克里木拜; Асхат Керімбайұлы), May 1988 – May 1993
12. Bekmūhammed Mūsaūly (别克木哈买提·木沙; Бекмұхамет Мұсаұлы), April 1993 – March 1998
13. Alpysbai Rahymūly (阿勒布斯拜·拉合木; Алпысбай Рахымұлы), March 1998 – June 2001
14. Nurlan Äbilmäjinulı (努尔兰·阿不都满金; Нұрлан Әбілмәжінұлы), March 2002 – January 2003
15. Qyzaijan Seiіlqojaūly (柯赛江·赛力禾加; Қызайжан Сейілқожаұлы), March 2003 – November 2007
16. Mäuken Seiіtqamzaūly (毛肯·赛衣提哈木扎; Мәукен Сейітқамзаұлы), November 2007 – January 2012
17. Mänen Zeinelūly (马宁·再尼勒; Мәнен Зейнелұлы), February 2012 – January 2016
18. Qūrmaş Syrjanūly (库尔玛什·斯尔江; Құрмаш Сыржанұлы), February 2016 – April 2021
19. Qadan Käbenuly (哈丹·卡宾; Қадан Кәбенұлы), April 2021 - October 2021
20. Ershat Tursynbay (s叶尔夏提·吐尔逊拜; Ершат Тұрсынбайұлы), from December 2021

== Notable people ==
- Ehmetjan Qasim
- Sayragul Sauytbay
- Shayilan Nuerdanbieke

== See also ==
- Ili pika
- Second East Turkestan Republic
- Treaty of Livadia
