= Zhagda Babalykov =

Kazakh politician

Jağda Babylyqūly
- Жағда Бабалықұлы Бабалықов

Governor of Ili Kazakh Autonomous Prefecture
- In office 1955–1958
- Preceded by: Fathan (Pätіhan) Dälelhanūly Sügіrbaev
- Succeeded by: Qūrmanälі Ospanūly

Personal details
- Born: 1 November 1917 Kuzhyrtai, Xinjiang, Republic of China
- Died: April 3, 2010 (aged 92) Almaty, Kazakhstan

Chinese name
- Simplified Chinese: 贾和达·巴巴里科夫
- Traditional Chinese: 賈和達·巴巴里科夫
Transcriptions
Standard Mandarin
- Hanyu Pinyin: Jiǎhédá Bābālǐkēfū

Zhagda Babalykov (Kazakh: Жағда Бабалықұлы Бабалықов, romanized: Jağda Babalıqulı Babalıqov; 1 November 1917 – 3 April 2010) was a Kazakh politician who served as governor of Ili Kazakh Autonomous Prefecture between 1955 and 1958, and chairman of Ili Kazakh Autonomous Prefecture Committee of the Chinese People's Political Consultative Conference between 1955 and 1959.

== Biography ==
Zhagda Babalykov was born in the village of Kuzhyrtai, at the foot of the Zhaiyr Mountains, on 1 November 1917. His father, Babalyk, born in 1860, was the only child in the family. He studied at a Kazakh school, then in the Tatar language school, then in 1941-1943 he graduated from the gymnasium in the city of Tacheng. That same time, he gathered educated Kazakhs, organized an underground national liberation organization and began active activities in the struggle for independence. For his freedom-loving views and actions, he was arrested and imprisoned more than once. In 1943–1947, while studying at the university in Ürümqi, he was arrested for nationalist actions and imprisoned.

After the founding of the Communist State, he became governor of Ili Kazakh Autonomous Prefecture in June 1955, and held that office until 1958. He also served as conference chairmen from May 1955 to September 1959.

In 1962, he arrived in Kazakhstan along with others. Before Kazakhstan gained independence, he worked in various fields. In particular, he was engaged in the study of ethnography and collected a lot of materials on the vocabulary of the Kazakh language.

He died on 3 April 2010 in Almaty, Kazakhstan, at the age of 92.

Government offices
Preceded by Fathan (Pätіhan) Dälelhanūly Sügіrbaev	Governor of Ili Kazakh Autonomous Prefecture; 1955–1958	Succeeded by Qūrmanälі Ospanūly
