= Dilshat Kidirhan =

Chinese politician of Kyrgyz ethnicity

- دىلشات قىدىرحان

Vice Chairman of the Xinjiang Regional Committee of the Chinese People's Political Consultative Conference
- Incumbent
- Assumed office February 2021
- Chairman: Nurlan Abilmazhinuly

Governor of Kizilsu Kyrgyz Autonomous Prefecture
- Incumbent
- Assumed office June 2016
- Party Secretary: Liu Huijun; An Zhengyu
- Preceded by: Perhat Turdi

Personal details
- Born: January 1966 (age 60) Tekes County, Xinjiang, China
- Party: Chinese Communist Party
- Education: Xinjiang Normal University; Northwest A&F University

Chinese name
- Simplified Chinese: 迪力夏提·柯德尔汗
- Traditional Chinese: 迪力夏提·柯德爾汗
Transcriptions
Standard Mandarin
- Hanyu Pinyin: Dílìxiàtí Kēdé'ěrhán

Dilshat Kidirhan (Kyrgyz: دىلشات قىدىرحان; Chinese: 迪力夏提·柯德尔汗; born January 1966) is a Chinese politician of Kyrgyz ethnicity who is the current governor of Kizilsu Kyrgyz Autonomous Prefecture and vice chairman of the Xinjiang Regional Committee of the Chinese People's Political Consultative Conference. He joined the Chinese Communist Party in December 1988, and entered the workforce in July 1990. He is a delegate to the 13th National People's Congress.

== Early life and education ==
Dilshat Kidirhan was born in Tekes County, Xinjiang, in January 1966. In September 1984, he was accepted to Xinjiang Normal University, majoring in Chinese language and literature. After graduation, he was admitted to Northwest A&F University, where he majored in agricultural economic management.

== Career ==
Dilshat Kidirhan worked in the Animal Husbandry Department of Xinjiang Uygur Autonomous Region after university, and was assigned to the Investment Promotion and Development Bureau of Xinjiang Uygur Autonomous Region in January 2011. In April 2015, he was admitted to member of the standing committee of the CCP Kizilsu Kyrgyz Autonomous Prefectural Committee, the prefecture's top authority. In June 2016, he was named acting governor of Kizilsu Kyrgyz Autonomous Prefecture, concurrently serving as vice chairman of the Xinjiang Regional Committee of the Chinese People's Political Consultative Conference since February 2021.

Government offices
Preceded by Perhat Turdi	Governor of Kizilsu Kyrgyz Autonomous Prefecture; 2016–present	Incumbent
