= Kurmash Syrzhanuly =

Chinese politician of Kazakh ethnicity

Qūrmaş Syrjanūly
- Құрмаш Сыржанұлы

Governor of Ili Kazakh Autonomous Prefecture
- In office February 2016 – April 2021
- Party Secretary: Zeng Cun; Zhao Tianjie
- Preceded by: Mänen Zeýnelulı
- Succeeded by: Qadan Käbenuly

Personal details
- Born: May 1959 (age 67) Jinghe County, Xinjiang, China
- Party: Chinese Communist Party
- Education: Kuitun Normal College; Xinjiang University

Chinese name
- Simplified Chinese: 库尔玛什·斯尔江
- Traditional Chinese: 庫爾瑪什·斯爾江
Transcriptions
Standard Mandarin
- Hanyu Pinyin: Kùěrmǎshí Sīěrjiāng

Kurmash Syrzhanuly (Kazakh: Құрмаш Сыржанұлы, romanized: Qurmaş Sırjanulı, born May 1959) is a Chinese politician of Kazakh ethnicity who served as governor of Ili Kazakh Autonomous Prefecture between 2016 and 2021.

== Biography ==
Qūrmaş Syrjanūly was born in Jinghe County, Xinjiang, in May 1959. He joined the Chinese Communist Party (CCP) in June 1984, and entered the workforce in the following month. He graduated from Kuitun Normal College and Xinjiang University.

After university, he worked at Xinjiang Academy of Forestry Sciences. Beginning in December 1987, he served in several posts in the Organization Department of CCP Xinjiang Uygur Autonomous Region Committee, including section member, deputy director, and investigator. He became deputy director of the Administration of Press and Publication of Xinjiang Uygur Autonomous Region in August 2007 before being appointed deputy head of the Organization Department of CCP Xinjiang Uygur Autonomous Region Committee in March 2008. In August 2013, he was made deputy secretary of its Commission for Discipline Inspection, the party's agency in charge of anti-corruption efforts. In February 2016, he took office as governor of Ili Kazakh Autonomous Prefecture, replacing Mänen Zeýnelulı. He is now a member of the Standing Committee of the People's Congress of Xinjiang Uygur Autonomous Region.

Government offices
Preceded by Mänen Zeýnelulı	Governor of Ili Kazakh Autonomous Prefecture; 2016–2021	Succeeded by Qadan Käbenuly
