= Qadan Käbenuly =

Chinese politician (born 1969)

- 哈丹·卡宾 قادان كابەن ۇلى

Secretary-General of Xinjiang Uygur Autonomous Regional Committee of the Chinese Communist Party
- Incumbent
- Assumed office October 2021
- Party Secretary: Chen Quanguo; Ma Xingrui
- Preceded by: Sarkyt Akanovich

Governor of Ili Kazakh Autonomous Prefecture
- In office April 2021 – October 2021
- Party Secretary: Qiu Shuhua
- Preceded by: Qurmaş Sırjanulı

Governor of Altay Prefecture
- In office March 2017 – April 2021
- Party Secretary: Zhang Yan
- Preceded by: Talgat Usen
- Succeeded by: Zhenis Khadis

Personal details
- Born: March 1969 (age 57) Barköl Kazakh Autonomous County, Xinjiang, China
- Party: Chinese Communist Party
- Education: Dalian University of Technology

Chinese name
- Simplified Chinese: 哈丹·卡宾
- Traditional Chinese: 哈丹·卡賓
Transcriptions
Standard Mandarin
- Hanyu Pinyin: Hādān Kǎbīn

Kazakh name
- Kazakh: قادان كابەن ۇلى; Қадан Кабенұлы; Qadan Kabenulı

Qadan Käbenuly (Chinese: 哈丹·卡宾; Kazakh: قادان كابەن ۇلى; born March 1969) is a Chinese politician of Kazakh ethnicity who is serving as secretary-general of the Xinjiang Uygur Autonomous Region Committee of the Chinese Communist Party (CCP), in office since October 2021. Previously he served as governor of Ili Kazakh Autonomous Prefecture and before that, as governor of Altay Prefecture.

== Biography ==
Qaden Kabenūly was born in Barköl Kazakh Autonomous County, Xinjiang, in March 1969. In 1988, he enrolled in Dalian University of Technology, majoring in organic chemicals. He joined the Chinese Communist Party (CCP) in October 2000.

After graduating in 1992, he joined the Xinjiang Chemical Design and Research Institute, where he was promoted to associate engineer in 1993 and to engineer in 1997. He served in the Xinjiang Uygur Autonomous Region Investment Company for a short while before assigning to the Enterprise Working Committee of Xinjiang Uygur Autonomous Region as an official in October 2000. In November 2004, he became director of Policies and Regulations Division of State Owned Assets Supervision and Administration Commission of Xinjiang Uygur Autonomous Region, a position he held until February 2012, when he was promoted to deputy director of the Economic and Information Technology Commission of Xinjiang Uygur Autonomous Region. In March 2016, he was appointed director of the Environmental Protection Department of Xinjiang Uygur Autonomous Region, but having held the position for only one year, then he took office as governor of Altay Prefecture. In April 2021, he was made governor of Ili Kazakh Autonomous Prefecture, succeeding Qurmaş Sırjanulı. In October 2021, he became secretary-general of CCP Xinjiang Uygur Autonomous Region Committee.

Government offices
Preceded by Dulihong Abdulson	Director of the Environmental Protection Department of Xinjiang Uygur Autonomous Region; 2016–2017	Succeeded by Talgat Usen
Preceded by Talgat Usen	Governor of Altay Prefecture; 2017–2021	Succeeded by Zhenis Khadis
Preceded by Qurmaş Sırjanulı	Governor of Ili Kazakh Autonomous Prefecture; 2021	Succeeded by TBA
Party political offices
Preceded by Sarkyt Akanovich	Secretary-General of the Xinjiang Uygur Autonomous Regional Committee of the Chinese Communist Party; 2021–present	Incumbent
