= Osama Qadan =

Osama Qadan أسامة قعدان
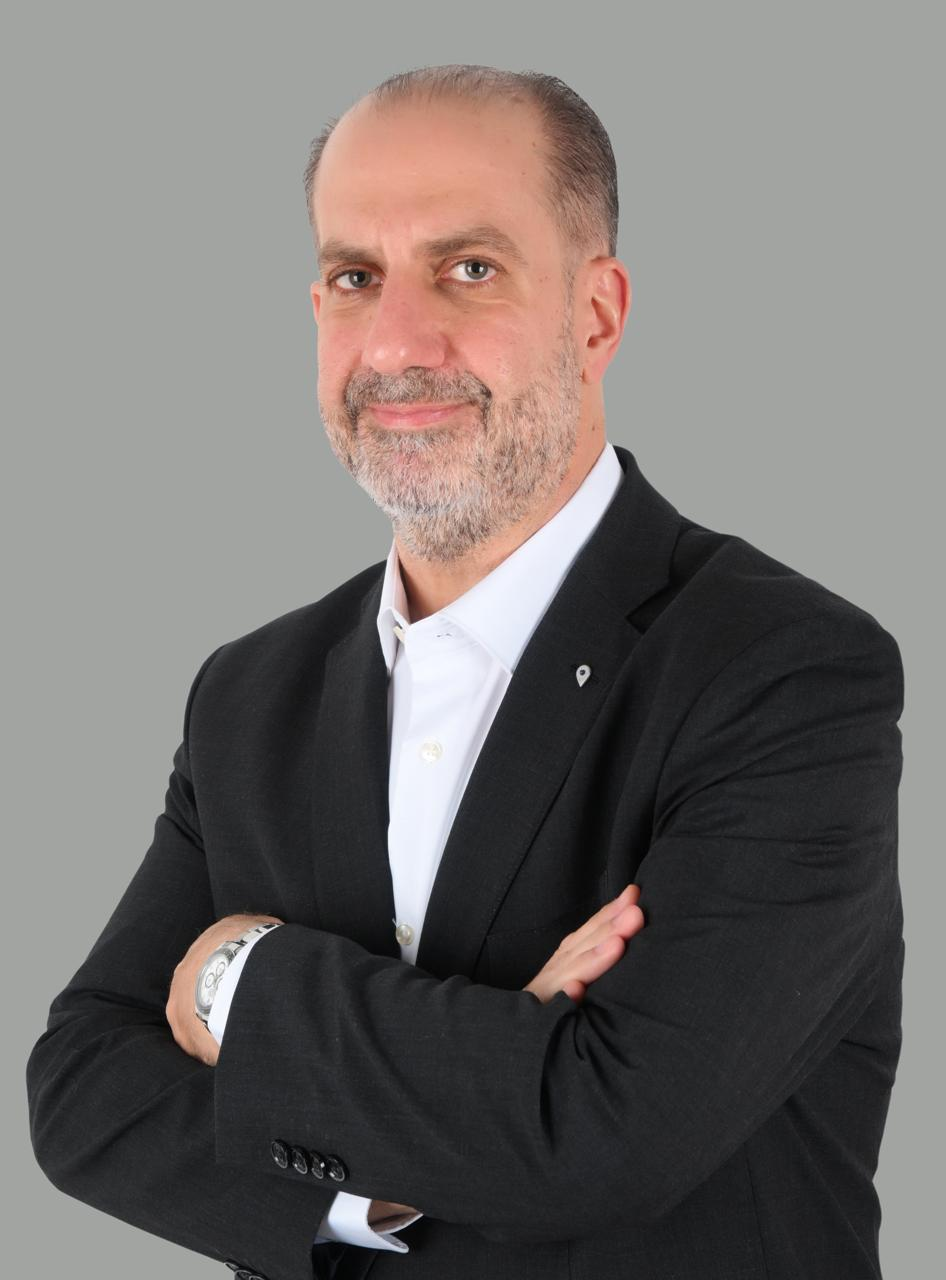
- Occupation: ICT Executive / Business Leader

Osama Qadan (Arabic: أسامه قعدان) is a technology executive active in the Middle East and Africa’s ICT, data centers, and Internet of Things (IoT) sectors. He is the founder of Equinox International and the previous Chief Executive Officer of iWire Global. He is currently the Chief Commercial Officer of Tech964.

== Early life and career ==
Qadan holds a Bachelor's degree in Electrical Engineering from the Jordan University of Science and Technology, a Master’s degree from the Georgia Institute of Technology, and an MBA from Johns Hopkins University.

He began his career in the United States, where he worked at Intelsat and Astrolink International in satellite communications, followed by a senior role at OPNET Technologies.

In 2005, Qadan founded Equinox International, a technology systems integrator operating across the Middle East and Africa. The company was involved in ICT infrastructure projects for government and enterprise sectors. In 2018, Equinox was acquired by Fiber Misr (later renamed Benya Capital), marking a major consolidation in the regional ICT sector.

== Post acquisition and career ==
Following the Equinox acquisition, Qadan became Chief Commercial Officer of Benya Group. He was involved in large-scale projects such as the national fibre-optic network in the Democratic Republic of the Congo, in partnership with the DRC government.

He then served till the end of 2025 as the Chief Executive Officer of iWire Global, a UAE-based IoT provider. He also served as the Chairman of UNA-IOT, which operates the Sigfox 0G network in Turkey. Currently, he serves as the Chief Commercial Officer of Tech964 responsible for directing and handling the commercial and strategic initiatives of the group.

== Research and publications ==
Qadan has co-authored research in satellite communications and network modeling.

- Choi, H.-K., Sala, D., Limb, J. O., Meyers, J., & Qadan, O. (2001). Interactive Web Service via Satellite to the Home. IEEE Communications Magazine, 39(3), 134–140.
- Yegenoglu, F., Faris, F., & Qadan, O. (2000). A Model for Representing Wide Area Internet Packet Behavior. Proceedings of the IEEE International Performance, Computing, and Communications Conference, 303–310.
- Lee, J. S., Duran, J. E., & Qadan, O. (2002). Simulation of the Multimedia Interactive Ku-Band Satellite. [Conference publication].
- Iuoraș, A., Di Girolamo, R., Garl, P., & Qadan, O. (2002). Integrated Protocols for Resource Management in Multimedia Satellites. [Technical paper].
- Qadan, O. (2002). An Overview of Intelsat’s Initiatives in Network Modeling and Simulation. [Technical paper].
