= Perhat Turdi =

Chinese politician of Kyrgyz ethnicity

- 帕尔哈提·吐尔地

Chairman of the People's Congress of Kizilsu Kyrgyz Autonomous Prefecture
- In office June 2016 – 2022

Governor of Kizilsu Kyrgyz Autonomous Prefecture
- In office January 2007 – June 2016
- Party Secretary: Yan Fenxin; Zeng Cun; Zhang Jinbiao; Liu Huijun
- Preceded by: Maimaiaishan Tohdali
- Succeeded by: Dilshat Kidirhan

Personal details
- Born: August 1957 (age 69) Akto County, Xinjiang, China
- Party: Chinese Communist Party
- Education: Xinjiang Finance and Trade School; Tianjin University

Chinese name
- Simplified Chinese: 帕尔哈提·吐尔地
- Traditional Chinese: 帕爾哈提·吐爾地
Transcriptions
Standard Mandarin
- Hanyu Pinyin: Pà'ěrhātí Tǔ'ěrdì

Perhat Turdi (Chinese: 帕尔哈提·吐尔地; born August 1957) is a Chinese politician of Kyrgyz ethnicity who served as governor of Kizilsu Kyrgyz Autonomous Prefecture and chairman of the People's Congress of Kizilsu Kyrgyz Autonomous Prefecture.

== Biography ==
Perhat Turdi was born in Akto County, Xinjiang, in August 1957. In September 1973, he worked as a sent-down youth at the Cadre Farm of Akto County. Two years later, he was accepted to Xinjiang Finance and Trade School, and was assigned to Aktao County Taxation Bureau after graduation. He joined the Chinese Communist Party in December 1986. In January 1991, he was dispatched to Aktao County Labor and Personnel Bureau as deputy head. He was promoted to be deputy mayor of the Finance Bureau of Kizilsu Kyrgyz Autonomous Prefecture in May 1993, concurrently holding the party branch secretary position since February 1998. In February 2000, he was transferred to Akqi County and appointed deputy party secretary and magistrate. In January 2002, he became assistant governor of Kizilsu Kyrgyz Autonomous Prefecture. He rose to become deputy governor in January 2003, rising to governor in January 2007. In June 2016, he took office as chairman of the People's Congress of Kizilsu Kyrgyz Autonomous Prefecture, and served until 2022.

Government offices
Preceded by Maimaiaishan Tohdali	Governor of Kizilsu Kyrgyz Autonomous Prefecture; 2007–2016	Succeeded by Dilshat Kidirhan
