= Gongliu County =

Gongliu County 巩留县 (Chinese) توققۇزتارا ناھىيىسى (Uyghur) توعىزتاراۋ اۋدانى (Kazakh) Tokkuztara County
- County
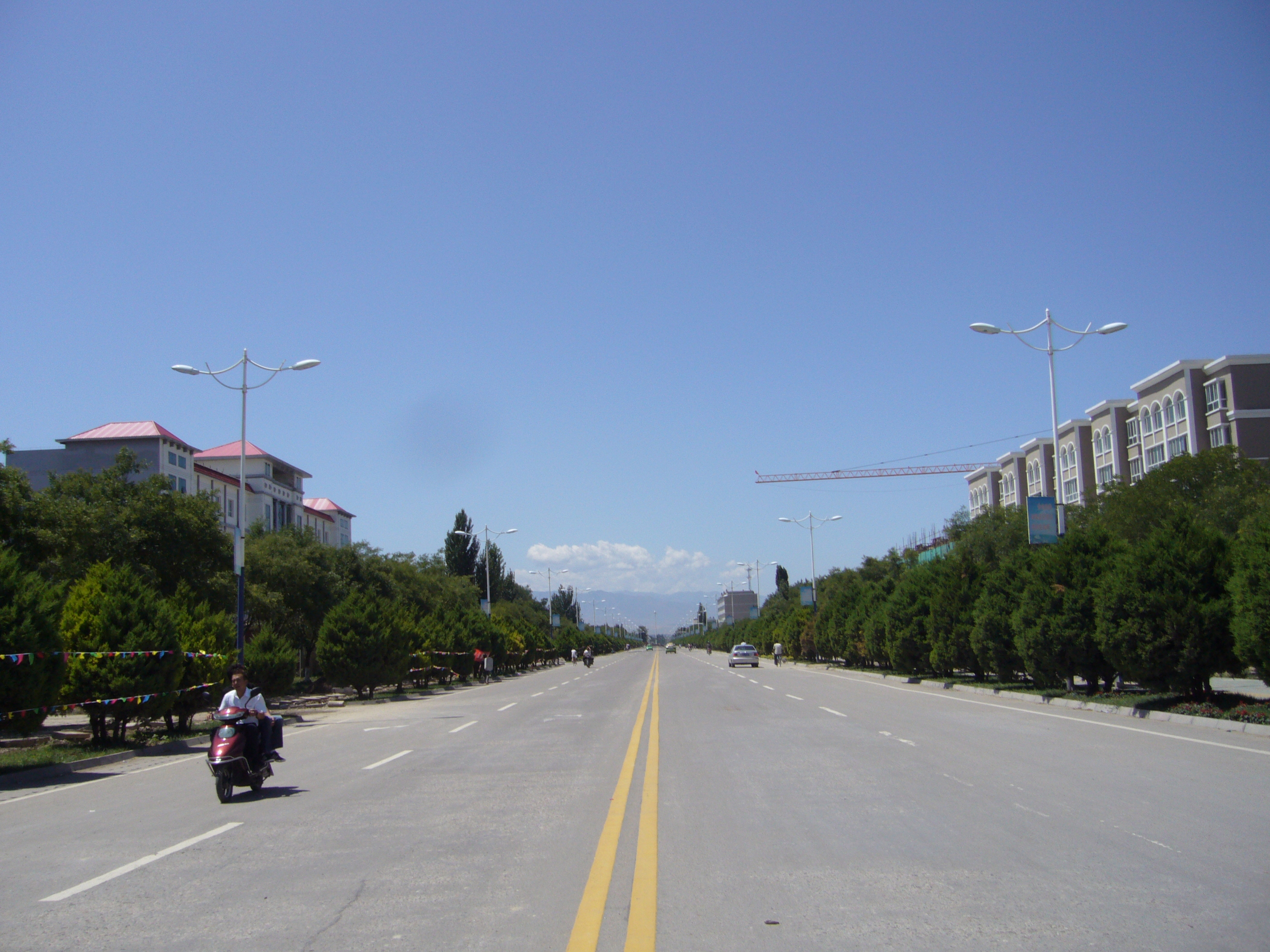

- Location of the seat in Xinjiang Gongliu (Xinjiang) Gongliu (China)
- Coordinates: 43°28′00″N 82°08′56″E
- Country: China
- Autonomous region: Xinjiang
- Autonomous prefecture: Ili
- County seat: Toqquztara Town

Area
  - Total: 4,116 km^{2} (1,589 sq mi)

Population (2020)
  - Total: 175,766
  - Density: 42.70/km^{2} (110.6/sq mi)
- Time zone: UTC+8 (China Standard (Note: Locals in Xinjiang frequently observe UTC+6 (Xinjiang Time), 2 hours behind Beijing.))
- Website: www.xjgl.gov.cn

Gongliu

Chinese name
- Simplified Chinese: 巩留县
- Traditional Chinese: 鞏留縣
Transcriptions
Standard Mandarin
- Hanyu Pinyin: Gǒngliú Xiàn

Alternative Chinese name
- Simplified Chinese: 特克斯塔留
Transcriptions
Standard Mandarin
- Hanyu Pinyin: Tèkèsītǎliú

Uyghur name
- Uyghur: توققۇزتارا ناھىيىسى
Transcriptions
- Latin Yëziqi: Toqquztara Nahiyisi
- Yengi Yeziⱪ: Toⱪⱪuztara Naⱨiyisi
- SASM/GNC: Tokkuztara Naĥiyə
- Siril Yëziqi: Тоққузтара наһийиси

Kazakh name
- Kazakh: توعىزتاراۋ اۋدانى Kazakh Cyrillic: Тоғызтарау ауданы Kazakh Latin alphabet: Toǵyztaraý aýdany

Gongliu County (Chinese: 巩留县) as the official romanized name, also transliterated from Uyghur as Tokkuztara County (Uyghur: توققۇزتارا ناھىيىسى; Chinese: 特克斯塔留县), is a county situated within the Xinjiang Uyghur Autonomous Region and is under the administration of the Ili Kazakh Autonomous Prefecture. It contains an area of 4,119 km^{2} (1,590 sq mi). According to the 2002 census, it has a population of 160,000.

== Name ==
The place was originally named Tokkuztara, meaning "nine streams" because branches of the Ili River merged in the area. When a county was set up in 1932, Gongliu was chosen as the official name, which is an abbreviation of Gonggu Changliu ("巩固长留"), literally Stability and Long-lasting.

== Administrative divisions ==
Gongliu County is divided into 6 towns and 2 townships.

Name	Simplified Chinese	Hanyu Pinyin	Uyghur (UEY)	Uyghur Latin (ULY)	Kazakh (Arabic script)	Kazakh (Cyrillic script)	Number of communities	Population (thousand)	Land area (km2)
Towns
Toqquztara Town	巩留镇	Gǒngliú Zhèn	توققۇزتارا بازىرى	toqquztara baziri	توعىزتاراۋ قالاشىعى		7	24.7	29
Aqtobek Town	阿克吐别克镇	Ākètǔbiékè Zhèn	ئاقتۆبەك بازىرى	Aqtöbek baziri	اقتۇبەك قالاشىعى		6	9.7	613.3
Kongdeneng Town	库尔德宁镇	Kù'ěrdéníng Zhèn	كۆلدەنەڭ بازىرى	köldeneng baziri	كولدەنەڭ قالاشىعى		7	9.8	568
Dongmehelle Town	东买里镇	Dōngmǎilǐ Zhèn	دۆڭمەھەللە بازىرى	döngmehelle baziri	دوڭمالى قالاشىعى		8	27	317
Agharsin Town	阿尕尔森镇	Āgǎ'ěrsēn Zhèn	ئاغارسىن بازىرى	Agharsin baziri	اعارسىن قالاشىعى		9	21.5	714
Tikeriq Town	提克阿热克镇	Tíkè'ārèkè Zhèn	تىكئېرىق بازىرى	tik'ëriq baziri	تىكارىق قالاشىعى		8	13.7	426.7
Townships
Jirghilang Township	吉尔格郎乡	Jí'ěrgéláng Xiāng	جىرغالاڭ يېزىسى	jirghalang yëzisi	جىرعالاڭ اۋىلى		6	6.6	420
Tashtope Township	塔斯托别乡	Tǎsītuōbié Xiāng	تاشتۆپە يېزىسى	tashtöpe yëzisi	تاستوبە اۋىلى		8	23.3	414

Note:

1. On October 21, 2014, with the approval of the Xinjiang Uygur Autonomous Region People's Government, the original Dongmahalla Township was renamed Dongmahalla Town.
2. In 2013, with the approval of the Xinjiang Uygur Autonomous Region People's Government, the original Agarsin Township was renamed Agarsin Town.
3. On July 13, 2016, with the approval of the People's Government of the Xinjiang Uygur Autonomous Region, the original Tikirik Township was renamed Tikirik Town.
4. On January 24, 2013, with the approval of the Xinjiang Uygur Autonomous Region People's Government, it was renamed the original "Muhur Township" Koldeneng Town.

== Climate ==
Climate data for Gongliu, elevation 775 m (2,543 ft), (1991–2020 normals, extremes 1991–present)
Month	Jan	Feb	Mar	Apr	May	Jun	Jul	Aug	Sep	Oct	Nov	Dec	Year
Record high °C (°F)	10.8 (51.4)	15.8 (60.4)	28.7 (83.7)	34.6 (94.3)	36.0 (96.8)	35.5 (95.9)	38.0 (100.4)	38.2 (100.8)	35.0 (95.0)	31.6 (88.9)	25.0 (77.0)	13.2 (55.8)	38.2 (100.8)
Mean daily maximum °C (°F)	−1.0 (30.2)	2.3 (36.1)	11.5 (52.7)	20.4 (68.7)	24.7 (76.5)	28.2 (82.8)	30.2 (86.4)	29.4 (84.9)	25.3 (77.5)	18.2 (64.8)	8.9 (48.0)	1.1 (34.0)	16.6 (61.9)
Daily mean °C (°F)	−8.8 (16.2)	−4.6 (23.7)	4.5 (40.1)	12.4 (54.3)	17.0 (62.6)	20.7 (69.3)	22.2 (72.0)	20.9 (69.6)	16.1 (61.0)	9.1 (48.4)	1.9 (35.4)	−5.5 (22.1)	8.8 (47.9)
Mean daily minimum °C (°F)	−14.7 (5.5)	−10.3 (13.5)	−1.3 (29.7)	5.6 (42.1)	10.2 (50.4)	14.0 (57.2)	15.2 (59.4)	13.5 (56.3)	8.6 (47.5)	2.5 (36.5)	−2.9 (26.8)	−10.4 (13.3)	2.5 (36.5)
Record low °C (°F)	−29.0 (−20.2)	−31.0 (−23.8)	−18.3 (−0.9)	−15.5 (4.1)	−1.0 (30.2)	3.4 (38.1)	6.6 (43.9)	0.5 (32.9)	−2.0 (28.4)	−7.8 (18.0)	−18.3 (−0.9)	−29.3 (−20.7)	−31.0 (−23.8)
Average precipitation mm (inches)	13.0 (0.51)	16.0 (0.63)	17.3 (0.68)	34.1 (1.34)	37.4 (1.47)	44.4 (1.75)	34.3 (1.35)	28.9 (1.14)	17.8 (0.70)	21.5 (0.85)	23.5 (0.93)	16.8 (0.66)	305 (12.01)
Average precipitation days (≥ 0.1 mm)	7.2	7.7	7.7	9.0	10.0	11.2	9.9	8.7	6.2	6.5	7.5	8.2	99.8
Average snowy days	8.3	8.8	4.3	1.2	0.1	0	0	0	0	0.7	5.1	9.5	38
Average relative humidity (%)	76	75	69	60	59	62	64	65	66	71	76	78	68
Mean monthly sunshine hours	163.3	168.6	217.2	240.1	284.3	282.1	304.9	295.7	260.1	222.7	152.9	141.3	2,733.2
Percentage possible sunshine	56	56	58	59	62	61	66	70	71	67	54	51	61
Source: China Meteorological Administration all-time July record (tied with 2011)
