= Nilka County =

Nilka County: 尼勒克县 (Chinese); نىلقا ناھىيىسى (Uyghur); نىلقى اۋدانى (Kazakh)
- County
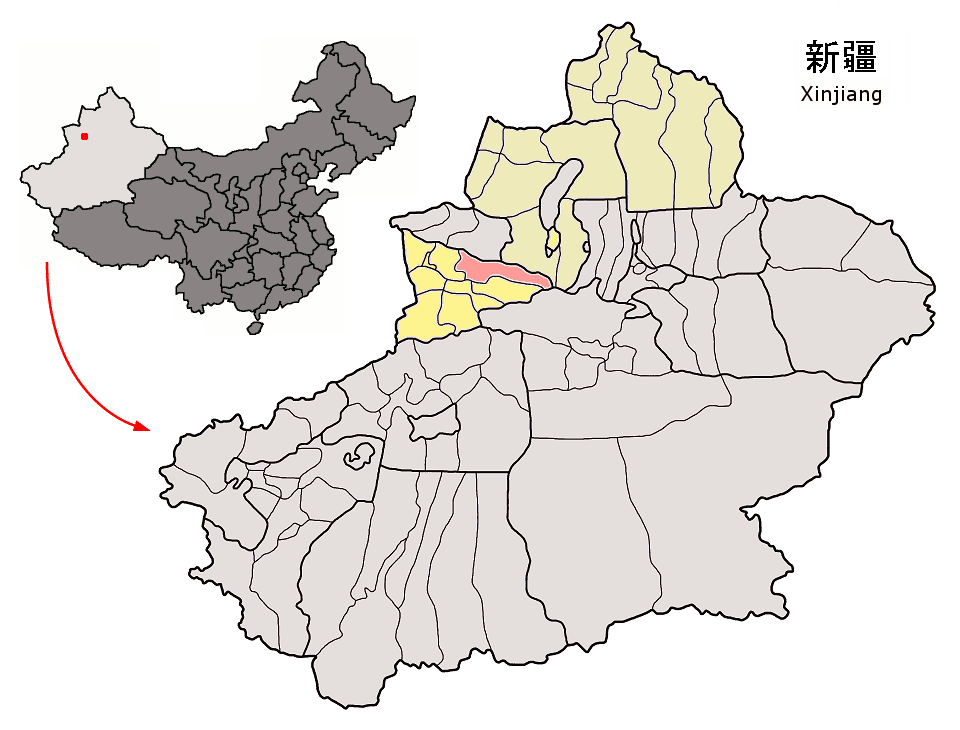
- Nilka County (red) within Ili Prefecture (yellow) and Xinjiang

- Location of the seat in Xinjiang Nilka (Xinjiang) Nilka (China)
- Coordinates: 43°48′01″N 82°30′42″E
- Country: China
- Autonomous region: Xinjiang
- Autonomous prefecture: Ili
- County seat: Nilqa Town

Area
  - Total: 10,122.62 km^{2} (3,908.37 sq mi)

Population (2020)
  - Total: 155,737
  - Density: 15.3850/km^{2} (39.8471/sq mi)
- Time zone: UTC+8 (China Standard (Note: Locals in Xinjiang frequently observe UTC+6 (Xinjiang Time), 2 hours behind Beijing.))
- Website: www.xjnlk.gov.cn

Nilka County

Chinese name
- Simplified Chinese: 尼勒克县
- Traditional Chinese: 尼勒克縣
Transcriptions
Standard Mandarin
- Hanyu Pinyin: Nílèkè Xiàn

Alternative Chinese name
- Simplified Chinese: 巩哈县
- Traditional Chinese: 鞏哈縣
Transcriptions
Standard Mandarin
- Hanyu Pinyin: Gǒnghā Xiàn

Mongolian name
- Mongolian Cyrillic: Нялх Шянь
- Mongolian script: ᠨᠢᠯᠬ᠎ᠠ ᠰᠢᠶᠠᠨ

Uyghur name
- Uyghur: نىلقا ناھىيىسى
Transcriptions
- Latin Yëziqi: Nilqa Nahiyisi
- Yengi Yeziⱪ: Nilⱪa Naⱨiyisi
- SASM/GNC: Nilka Nahiyisi
- Siril Yëziqi: Нилқа Наһийиси

Kazakh name
- Kazakh: نىلقى اۋدانى; Нылқы ауданы; Nylqy audany

Nilka County is a county situated in Xinjiang Uyghur Autonomous Region, China and is under the administration of the Ili Kazakh Autonomous Prefecture. It contains an area of 10,121 km^{2} (3,908 sq mi). According to the 2002 census, it has a population of 150,000.

== Demographics ==
The proportion of nationalities in Nilka County
Nationality	Percentage
Kazakhs	48.4%
Han People	22.4%
Uyghurs	11.9%
Hui People	10.6%
Mongols	4.8%
Kygryz	0.4%
Xibe	0.3%
Uzbek	0.1%
Others	0.1%
Source of the population statistics :

== Administrative division ==
Nilka County is divided into 5 towns, 5 townships, and 1 ethnic township.

Name	Simplified Chinese	Hanyu Pinyin	Uyghur (UEY)	Uyghur Latin (ULY)	Kazakh (Arabic script)	Kazakh (Cyrillic script)	Notes	Population (thousand)	Area km2	Number of communities
Towns
Nilqa Town	尼勒克镇	Nílèkè Zhèn	نىلقا بازىرى	nilqa baziri	نىلقى قالاشىعى	Нылқы қалашығы		10	31.9	84.67
Ulastay Town	乌拉斯台镇	Wūlāsītái Zhèn	ئۇلاستاي بازىرى	Ulastay baziri	ىلاستاي قالاشىعى	Ыластай қалашығы		7	9.8	80
Özen Town	乌赞镇	Wūzàn Zhèn	ئۆزەن بازىرى	Özen baziri	وزەن قالاشىعى	Озен қалашығы		7	16.3	458
Mis Town	木斯镇	Mùsī Zhèn	مىس بازىرى	mis baziri	مىس قالاشىعى	Мыс қалашығы		9	13	394
Këleng Town	克令镇	Kèlìng Zhèn	كېلەڭ بازىرى	këleng baziri	كىلەڭ قالاشىعى	Кылең қалашығы		7	11.2	372
Townships
Suptay Township	苏布台乡	Sūbùtái Xiāng	سۇپتاي يېزىسى	suptay yëzisi	سۇپتاي اۋىلى	Сұптай ауылы		4	6.9	229
Qarasu Township	喀拉苏乡	Kālāsū Xiāng	قاراسۇ يېزىسى	qarasu yëzisi	قاراسۋ اۋىلى	Қарасу ауылы		8	13.5	575.2
Yaqaulastay Township	加哈乌拉斯台乡	Jiāhāwūlāsītái Xiāng	ياقا ئۇلاستاي يېزىسى	yaqa Ulastay yëzisi	جاعالاستاي اۋىلى	Жағаластай ауылы		6	8.5	479.33
Qaratöpe Township	喀拉托别乡	Kālātuōbié Xiāng	قاراتۆپە يېزىسى	qaratöpe yëzisi	قاراتوبە اۋىلى	Қаратобе ауылы		4	9.1	1075.2
Qujurtay Township	胡吉尔台乡	Hújí'ěrtái Xiāng	قۇجۇرتاي يېزىسى	qujurtay yëzisi	قۇجىرتاي اۋىلى	Қужыртай ауылы		9	10.3	471.87
Ethnic Township
Kökxotqor Mongol Ethnic Township	科克浩特浩尔蒙古民族乡	Kēkèhàotèhào'ěr Ménggǔ Mínzúxiāng	كۆكخوتقور موڭغۇل يېزىسى	kökxotqor mongghul yëzisi	كوكعوتقىر موڭعۇل ۇلتتىق اۋىلى	Көкғотқыр Моңғұл Ұлттық ауылы	(Mongolian) ᠬᠥᠬᠡᠬᠣᠲᠣᠭᠣᠷ ᠮᠣᠩᠭᠣᠯ ᠦᠨᠳᠦᠰᠦᠲᠡᠨ ᠦ ᠰᠢᠶᠠᠩ; Хөххотгор монгол үндэстэний шиян	10	14.6	668

== Climate ==
Climate data for Nilka, elevation 1,105 m (3,625 ft), (1991–2020 normals, extremes 1991–present)
Month	Jan	Feb	Mar	Apr	May	Jun	Jul	Aug	Sep	Oct	Nov	Dec	Year
Record high °C (°F)	12.6 (54.7)	13.8 (56.8)	27.6 (81.7)	32.4 (90.3)	33.9 (93.0)	34.4 (93.9)	38.1 (100.6)	37.9 (100.2)	34.4 (93.9)	32.0 (89.6)	23.9 (75.0)	14.2 (57.6)	38.1 (100.6)
Mean daily maximum °C (°F)	−1.2 (29.8)	1.9 (35.4)	9.8 (49.6)	18.5 (65.3)	22.7 (72.9)	26.3 (79.3)	28.7 (83.7)	28.5 (83.3)	24.2 (75.6)	17.1 (62.8)	8.1 (46.6)	0.9 (33.6)	15.5 (59.8)
Daily mean °C (°F)	−9.9 (14.2)	−5.9 (21.4)	2.4 (36.3)	10.3 (50.5)	14.7 (58.5)	18.5 (65.3)	20.3 (68.5)	19.4 (66.9)	14.7 (58.5)	7.6 (45.7)	0.5 (32.9)	−6.7 (19.9)	7.2 (44.9)
Mean daily minimum °C (°F)	−16.2 (2.8)	−12.2 (10.0)	−3.5 (25.7)	3.6 (38.5)	7.8 (46.0)	11.6 (52.9)	13.1 (55.6)	11.6 (52.9)	6.8 (44.2)	0.9 (33.6)	−4.4 (24.1)	−12.1 (10.2)	0.6 (33.0)
Record low °C (°F)	−34.0 (−29.2)	−33.9 (−29.0)	−27.4 (−17.3)	−18.5 (−1.3)	−3.8 (25.2)	2.1 (35.8)	5.0 (41.0)	−1.8 (28.8)	−4.0 (24.8)	−9.6 (14.7)	−21.0 (−5.8)	−35.1 (−31.2)	−35.1 (−31.2)
Average precipitation mm (inches)	17.7 (0.70)	17.6 (0.69)	23.6 (0.93)	44.7 (1.76)	54.2 (2.13)	58.6 (2.31)	57.0 (2.24)	40.6 (1.60)	21.4 (0.84)	29.7 (1.17)	32.1 (1.26)	23.6 (0.93)	420.8 (16.56)
Average precipitation days (≥ 0.1 mm)	7.7	8.1	9.2	10.3	11.5	12.2	12.0	9.0	6.4	7.6	8.8	8.9	111.7
Average snowy days	9.6	10.7	6.9	2.0	0.3	0	0	0	0	2.3	8.2	11.1	51.1
Average relative humidity (%)	75	74	69	60	61	64	63	61	62	68	74	76	67
Mean monthly sunshine hours	159.9	167.9	214.1	235.3	278.7	281.4	303.9	294.5	257.3	218.0	154.6	140.6	2,706.2
Percentage possible sunshine	55	56	57	58	61	61	66	69	70	66	55	51	60
Source: China Meteorological Administrationall-time extreme temperature
