= Zhaosu County =

County of Ili Kazakh Autonomous Prefecture in Xinjiang, China

Zhaosu County 昭苏县 (Chinese) موڭغۇلكۈرە ناھىيىسى (Uyghur) موڭعۇلكۇرە اۋدانى (Kazakh) Mongolküre County
- County
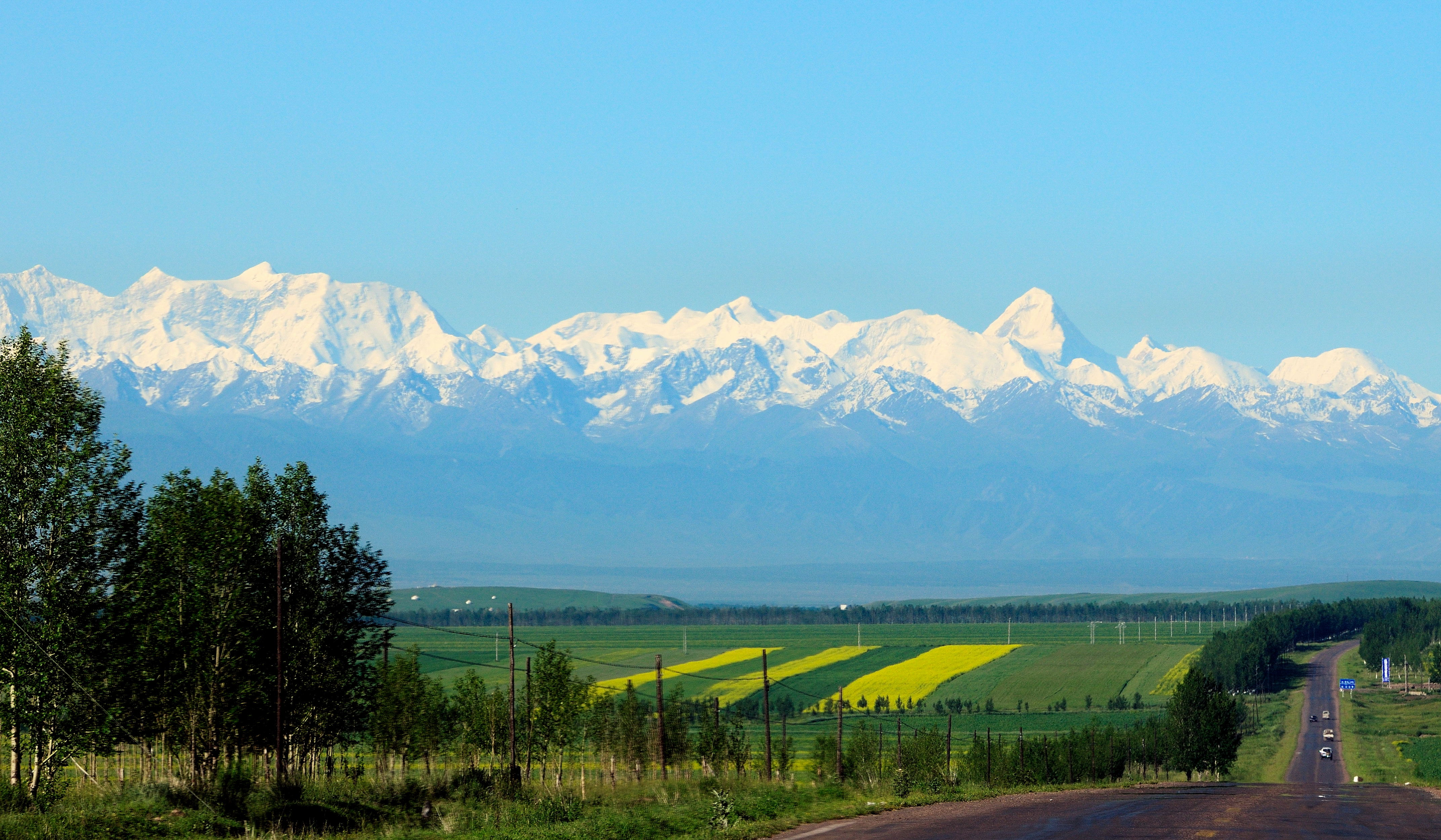

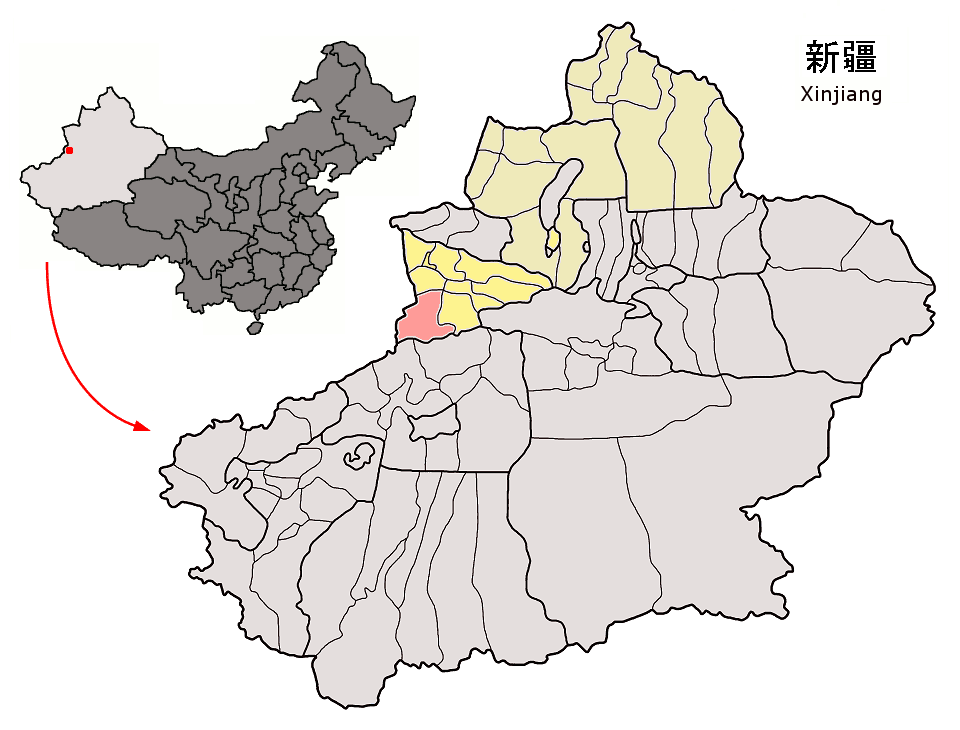
- Zhaosu County (red) within Ili Prefecture (yellow) in Xinjiang

- Location of the seat in Xinjiang Zhaosu (Xinjiang) Zhaosu (China)
- Coordinates: 43°09′26″N 81°07′52″E
- Country: China
- Autonomous region: Xinjiang
- Autonomous prefecture: Ili
- County seat: Mongolküre Town

Area
  - Total: 10,426.93 km^{2} (4,025.86 sq mi)

Population (2020)
  - Total: 146,887
  - Density: 14.0873/km^{2} (36.4859/sq mi)
- Time zone: UTC+8 (China Standard (Note: Locals in Xinjiang frequently observe UTC+6 (Xinjiang Time), 2 hours behind Beijing.))
- Website: www.zhaosu.gov.cn

Zhaosu County

Chinese name
- Simplified Chinese: 昭苏县
- Traditional Chinese: 昭蘇縣
Transcriptions
Standard Mandarin
- Hanyu Pinyin: Zhāosū Xiàn

Mongolküre County
- Simplified Chinese: 蒙古库热县
- Traditional Chinese: 蒙古庫熱縣
Transcriptions
Standard Mandarin
- Hanyu Pinyin: Ménggǔkùrè Xiàn

Uyghur name
- Uyghur: موڭغۇلكۈرە ناھىيىسى
- Literal meaning: Temple of the Mongols
Transcriptions
- Latin Yëziqi: Mongghulküre Nahiyisi
- Yengi Yeziⱪ: Mongƣulkürə Naⱨiyisi
- SASM/GNC: Monggulküra Nahiyisi
- Siril Yëziqi: Моңғулкүрә Наһийиси

Kazakh name
- Kazakh: موڭعۇلكۇرە اۋدانى; Моңғолкүре ауданы Moñğolküre audany

Kyrgyz name
- Kyrgyz: موڭعۇلكۉرۅ وودانى; Монголкюре аймакчасы

Oirat name
- Oirat: ᠮᡆᡊᡎᡆᠯᡘᡉᠷᡄᡃ ᠰᠢᠶᠠᠨ

Zhaosu County (Chinese: 昭苏县), also known as Mongolküre County (from Uyghur: موڭغۇلكۈرە, romanized: Mongghulküre, lit. 'Temple of the Mongols'), is a county in northwestern Xinjiang, China. It is under the administration of Ili Kazakh Autonomous Prefecture and shares a border with Kazakhstan's Almaty Region to the west. It covers an area of 10,455 km^{2} (4,037 sq mi). According to the 2012 census, it had a population of 189,102.

== Administrative divisions ==
Zhaosu County is divided into 6 towns, 1 township, and 3 ethnic townships.

Name	Simplified Chinese	Hanyu Pinyin	Uyghur (UEY)	Uyghur Latin (ULY)	Kazakh (Arabic script)	Kazakh (Cyrillic script)	Administrative division code	Notes
Towns
Mongolküre Town	昭苏镇	Zhāosū Zhèn	موڭغۇلكۈرە بازىرى	mongghulküre baziri	موڭعۇلكۇرە قالاشىعى	Моңғолкүре қалашығы	654026100	
Qashajar Town	喀夏加尔镇	Kāxiàjiā'ěr Zhèn	قاشاجار بازىرى	qashajar baziri	قاشاجار قالاشىعى	Қашажар қалашығы	654026101	
Aqdala Town	阿克达拉镇	Ākèdálā Zhèn	ئاقدالا بازىرى	Aqdala baziri	اقدالا قالاشىعى	Ақдала қалашығы	654026102	
Qarasu Town	喀拉苏镇	Kālāsū Zhèn	قاراسۇ بازىرى	qarasu baziri	قاراسۋ قالاشىعى	Қарасу қалашығы	654026103	
Xonuqay Town	洪纳海镇	Hóngnàhǎi Zhèn	خونۇقاي بازىرى	xonuqay baziri	قوناقاي قالاشىعى	Қонақай қалашығы	654026104	
Uzunbulaq Town	乌尊布拉克镇	Wūzūnbùlākè Zhèn	ئۇزۇنبۇلاق بازىرى	Uzunbulaq baziri	ۇزىنبۇلاق قالاشىعى	Ұзынбұлақ қалашығы	654026105	
Township
Sarqobu Township	萨尔阔布乡	Sà'ěrkuòbù Xiāng	سارقوبۇ يېزىسى	sarqobu yëzisi	سارقوبى اۋىلى	Сарқобы ауылы	654026203	
Ethnic Townships
Chaganuysun Mongol Ethnic Township	察汗乌苏蒙古族乡	Cháhànwūsū Ménggǔzú Xiāng	چاغان ئۇسۇ موڭغۇل يېزىسى	chaghan Usu mongghul yëzisi	ساعانۋسۇن موڭعۇل ۇلتتىق اۋىلى	Сағанусұн Моңғұл Ұлттық ауылы	654026206	(Mongolian) ᠴᠠᠭᠠᠨ᠋ᠤ᠋ᠰᠤᠨ ᠮᠣᠩᠭᠣᠯ ᠦᠨᠳᠦᠰᠦᠲᠡᠨ ᠦ ᠰᠢᠶᠠᠩ; Цагааносон монгол үндэстэний шиян
Shota Kyrgyz Ethnic Township	夏特柯尔克孜族乡	Xiàtè Kē'ěrkèzīzú Xiāng	شات قىرغىز يېزىسى	shat qirghiz yëzisi	شاتى قىرعىز ۇلتتىق اۋىلى	Шаты Қырғыз Ұлттық ауылы	654026207	(Kyrgyz) شاتى قىرعىز ۇلۇتتۇق ايىلى; Шаты Кыргыз улуттук айылы
Husongtukaerxun Mongol Ethnic Township	胡松图喀尔逊蒙古族乡	Húsōngtúkā'ěrxùn Ménggǔzú Xiāng	خۇسۇمتۇ خارسۇن موڭغۇل يېزىسى	xusumtu xarsun mongghul yëzisi	حۇسۇمتۋ حارسۇن موڭعۇل ۇلتتىق اۋىلى	Хұсұмтұ Харсұн Моңғұл Ұлттық ауылы	654026208	(Mongolian) ᠬᠤᠰᠤᠮᠲᠤ ᠬᠠᠷᠠᠤ᠋ᠰᠤᠨ ᠮᠣᠩᠭᠣᠯ ᠦᠨᠳᠦᠰᠦᠲᠡᠨ ᠦ ᠰᠢᠶᠠᠩ; Хусамт хар-усан монгол үндэстэний шиян

Others:

- 74th Regiment of the XPCC (兵团七十四团) (74-تۇەن مەيدانى) (74-تۋان الاڭىنداعى)
- 75th Regiment of the XPCC (兵团七十五团) (75-تۇەن مەيدانى) (75-تۋان الاڭىنداعى)
- 76th Regiment of the XPCC (兵团七十六团) (76-تۇەن مەيدانى) (76-تۋان الاڭىنداعى)
- 77th Regiment of the XPCC (兵团七十七团) (77-تۇەن مەيدانى) (77-تۋان الاڭىنداعى)

== Climate ==
Climate data for Zhaosu, elevation 1,851 m (6,073 ft), (1991–2020 normals, extremes 1991–present)
Month	Jan	Feb	Mar	Apr	May	Jun	Jul	Aug	Sep	Oct	Nov	Dec	Year
Record high °C (°F)	6.0 (42.8)	10.1 (50.2)	21.7 (71.1)	27.7 (81.9)	27.4 (81.3)	28.7 (83.7)	32.2 (90.0)	32.7 (90.9)	30.6 (87.1)	25.8 (78.4)	19.1 (66.4)	8.9 (48.0)	32.7 (90.9)
Mean daily maximum °C (°F)	−5.1 (22.8)	−3.1 (26.4)	3.4 (38.1)	13.5 (56.3)	17.4 (63.3)	20.3 (68.5)	22.4 (72.3)	22.8 (73.0)	19.3 (66.7)	12.0 (53.6)	3.0 (37.4)	−3.3 (26.1)	10.2 (50.4)
Daily mean °C (°F)	−10.6 (12.9)	−8.3 (17.1)	−1.7 (28.9)	6.7 (44.1)	10.8 (51.4)	14.0 (57.2)	15.8 (60.4)	15.6 (60.1)	11.9 (53.4)	5.3 (41.5)	−2.4 (27.7)	−8.5 (16.7)	4.1 (39.3)
Mean daily minimum °C (°F)	−15.3 (4.5)	−13.0 (8.6)	−6.0 (21.2)	1.5 (34.7)	5.6 (42.1)	8.8 (47.8)	10.3 (50.5)	9.8 (49.6)	6.0 (42.8)	0.3 (32.5)	−6.5 (20.3)	−12.8 (9.0)	−0.9 (30.3)
Record low °C (°F)	−29.3 (−20.7)	−31.2 (−24.2)	−22.9 (−9.2)	−17.8 (0.0)	−5.7 (21.7)	0.2 (32.4)	3.1 (37.6)	−2.9 (26.8)	−5.8 (21.6)	−14.4 (6.1)	−24.2 (−11.6)	−31.6 (−24.9)	−31.6 (−24.9)
Average precipitation mm (inches)	6.7 (0.26)	9.5 (0.37)	16.5 (0.65)	50.1 (1.97)	81.7 (3.22)	90.2 (3.55)	91.0 (3.58)	77.1 (3.04)	44.2 (1.74)	28.3 (1.11)	18.8 (0.74)	9.3 (0.37)	523.4 (20.6)
Average precipitation days (≥ 0.1 mm)	6.1	7.4	9.0	11.9	17.3	18.7	18.4	16.3	11.2	8.6	8.1	7.5	140.5
Average snowy days	9.8	10.3	11.0	6.0	2.1	0.2	0.2	0.2	0.6	5.5	9.5	10.3	65.7
Average relative humidity (%)	71	73	74	63	63	67	67	61	58	64	72	73	67
Mean monthly sunshine hours	175.3	178.9	214.9	222.7	249.6	248.6	272.0	267.1	242.3	215.3	158.0	152.9	2,597.6
Percentage possible sunshine	60	59	57	55	55	54	59	63	66	65	55	55	59
Source: China Meteorological Administration

== Demographics ==
As of 2012, the population of Zhaosu County is 189,102, among which 47.55 per cent are Kazakh, 28.65 per cent are Han Chinese, and 9.66 per cent are Uyghur.

Reports suggest that an influx of Han migrants to the county began circa 2008.

== Economy ==
By 2020, several Han Chinese restaurants had been opened in the county to accommodate an influx of Han migrants. The county is served by Zhaosu Tianma Airport.

== Agriculture ==
Potatoes and wheat are the crops primarily cultivated in Zhaosu.

== Education ==
Shuguang Middle School, formerly Number 1 Middle School, is located in Zhaosu.
