= Tekes County =

Tekes County: 特克斯县 (Chinese); تېكەس ناھىيىسى (Uyghur); تەكەس اۋدانى (Kazakh)
- County
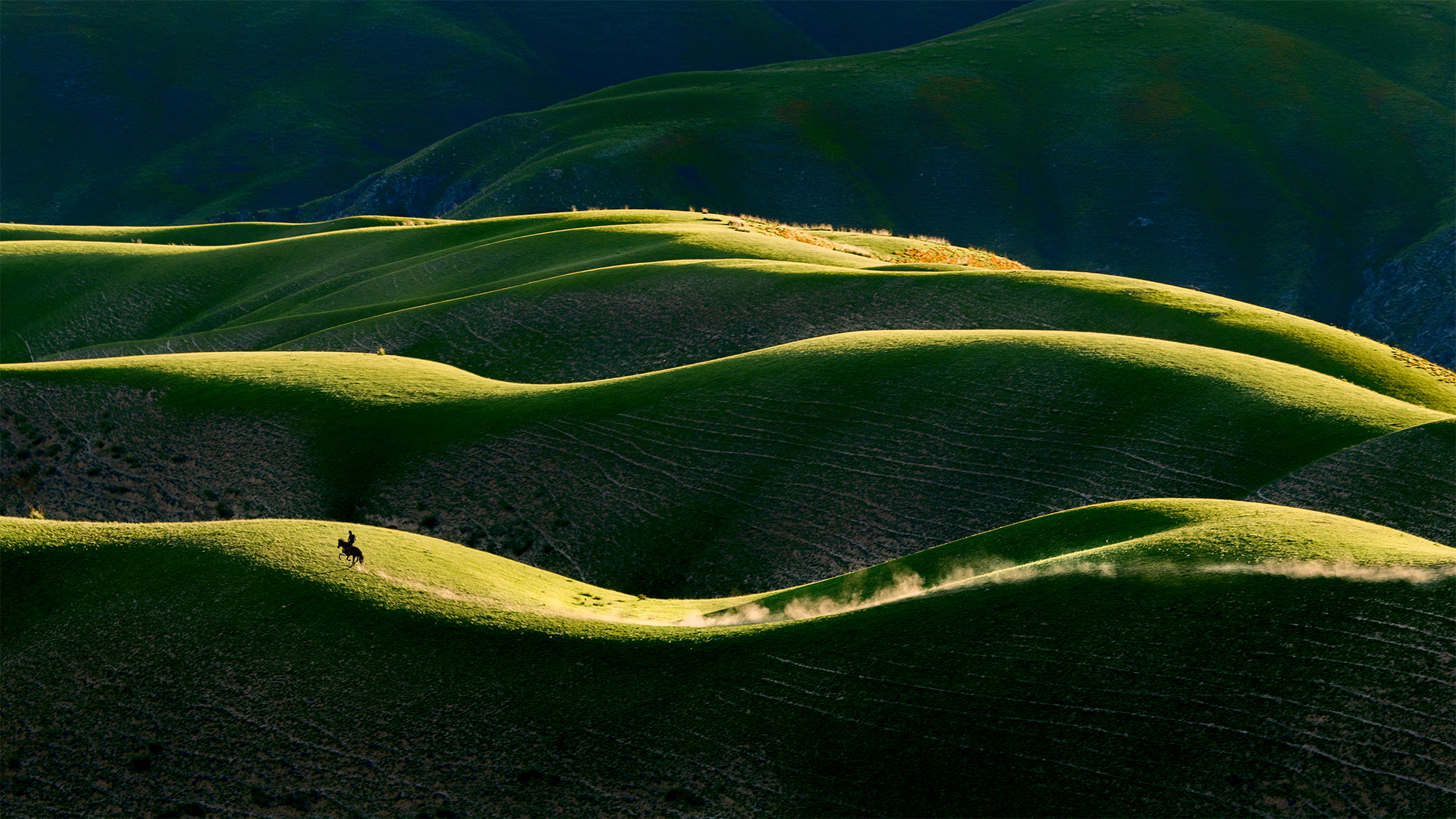
- Steppe of Tekes County

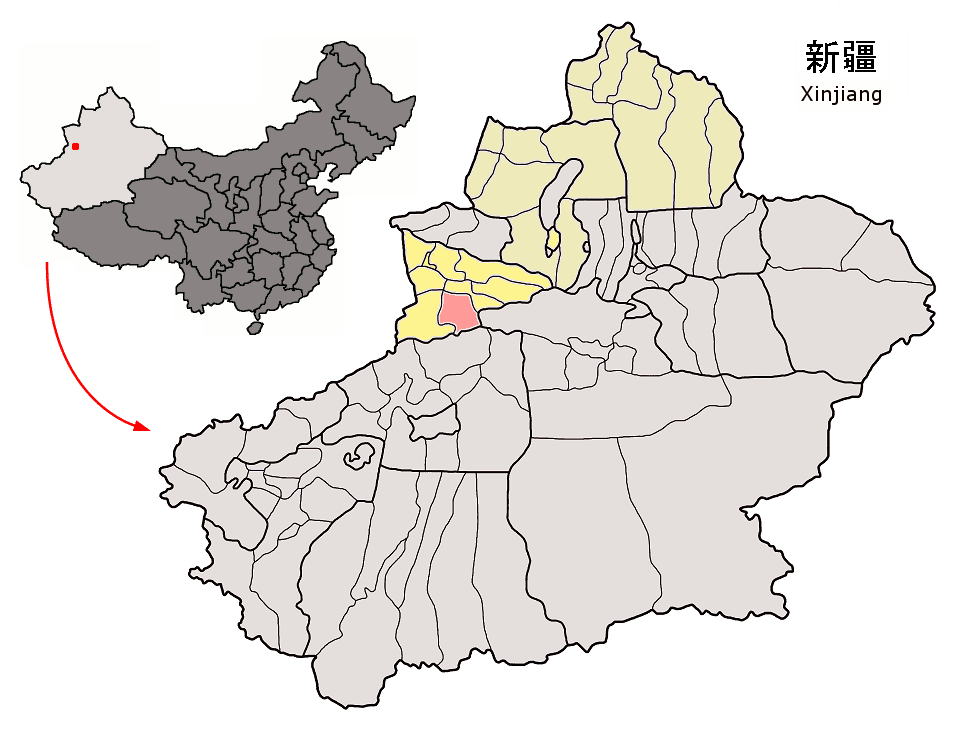
- Tekes County (red) within Ili Prefecture (yellow) and Xinjiang

- Location of the seat in Xinjiang Tekes (Xinjiang) Tekes (China)
- Coordinates: 43°12′49″N 81°50′14″E
- Country: China
- Autonomous region: Xinjiang
- Autonomous prefecture: Ili
- County seat: Tekes Town

Area
  - Total: 8,066.45 km^{2} (3,114.47 sq mi)

Population (2020)
  - Total: 148,945
  - Density: 18.4648/km^{2} (47.8235/sq mi)
- Time zone: UTC+8 (China Standard (Note: Locals in Xinjiang frequently observe UTC+6 (Xinjiang Time), 2 hours behind Beijing.))
- Website: www.zgtks.gov.cn

Tekes County

Chinese name
- Simplified Chinese: 特克斯县
- Traditional Chinese: 特克斯縣
Transcriptions
Standard Mandarin
- Hanyu Pinyin: Tèkèsī Xiàn
- Wade–Giles: Tʻê^{4}-kʻo^{4}-ssŭ^{1} Hsien^{4}

Mongolian name
- Mongolian Cyrillic: Такас шиан
- Mongolian script: ᠲᠡᠺᠡᠰ ᠰᠢᠶᠠᠨ

Uyghur name
- Uyghur: تېكەس ناھىيىسى
Transcriptions
- Latin Yëziqi: Tëkes Nahiyisi
- Yengi Yeziⱪ: Tekəs Naⱨiyisi
- SASM/GNC: Tekas Nahiyisi
- Siril Yëziqi: Текәс Наһийиси

Kazakh name
- Kazakh: تەكەس اۋدانى; Текес ауданы Tekes aýdany

Kyrgyz name
- Kyrgyz: تەكەس وودانى; Текес ооданы Tekes oodany

Tekes County is a county within the Xinjiang Uyghur Autonomous Region and is under the administration of the Ili Kazakh Autonomous Prefecture. It contains an area of 8,067 km^{2}. According to the 2002 census, it has a population of 150,000.

The county center is known for being a planned community with a shape of a ba gua.

== Administrative divisions ==
Tekes County is divided into 5 towns, 1 township, and 2 ethnic townships.

Name	Simplified Chinese	Hanyu Pinyin	Uyghur (UEY)	Uyghur Latin (ULY)	Kazakh (Arabic script)	Kazakh (Cyrillic script)	Administrative division code	Notes
Towns
Tekes Town	特克斯镇	Tèkèsī Zhèn	تېكەس بازىرى	tëkes baziri	تەكەس قالاشىعى	Текес қалашығы	654027100	
Cholaqtërek Town	乔拉克铁热克镇	Qiáolākètiěrèkè Zhèn	چولاقتېرەك بازىرى	cholaqtërek baziri	شولاقتەرەك قالاشىعى	Шолақтерек қалашығы	654027101	
Qaradala Town	喀拉达拉镇	Kālādálā Zhèn	قارادالا بازىرى	qaradala baziri	قارادالا قالاشىعى	Қарадала қалашығы	654027102	
Chil'özek Town	齐勒乌泽克镇	Qílèwūzékè Zhèn	چىلئۆزەك بازىرى	chil'özek baziri	شيلىوزەك قالاشىعى	Шиліөзек қалашығы	654027104	
Qaratoqay Town	喀拉托海镇	Kālātuōhǎi Zhèn	قاراتوقاي بازىرى	qaratoqay baziri	قاراتوعاي قالاشىعى	Қаратоғай қалашығы	654027104	
Township
Köksu Township	阔克苏乡	Kuòkèsū Xiāng	كۆكسۇ يېزىسى	köksu yëzisi	كوكسۋ اۋىلى	Көксу ауылы	654027201	
Ethnic Township
Xujirti Mongol Ethnic Township	呼吉尔特蒙古民族乡	Hūjí'ěrtè Ménggǔ Mínzúxiāng	خۇجىرتى موڭغۇل يېزىسى	xujirti mongghul yëzisi	حۇجىرتى موڭعۇل ۇلتتىق اۋىلى	Хұжырты Моңғұл Ұлттық ауылы	654027200	(Mongolian) ᠬᠤᠵᠢᠷᠲᠤ ᠮᠣᠩᠭᠣᠯ ᠦᠨᠳᠦᠰᠦᠲᠡᠨ ᠤ ᠰᠢᠶᠠᠩ; Хужирт монгол үндэстэний шиян
Köktërek Kyrgyz Ethnic Township	阔克铁热克柯尔克孜民族乡	Kuòkètiěrèkè Kē'ěrkèzī Mínzúxiāng	كۆكتېرەك قىرغىز يېزىسى	köktërek qirghiz yëzisi	كوكتەرەك قىرعىز ۇلتتىق اۋىلى	Көктерек қырғыз ұлттық ауылы	654027203	(Kyrgyz) كۅكتەرەك قىرعىز ۇلۇتتۇق ايىلى көктерек кыргыз улуттук айылы

- Others:
  - Tekes County Horse Herding Pasture (特克斯县马场)
  - Koksu Tree Farm (科克苏林场)
  - 78th Regiment of the XPCC (兵团七十八团) (78-تۇەن مەيدانى) (78-تۋان الاڭىنداعى)

== Climate ==
Climate data for Tekes, elevation 1,210 m (3,970 ft), (1991–2020 normals, extremes 1991–present)
Month	Jan	Feb	Mar	Apr	May	Jun	Jul	Aug	Sep	Oct	Nov	Dec	Year
Record high °C (°F)	8.1 (46.6)	14.3 (57.7)	24.1 (75.4)	32.4 (90.3)	33.1 (91.6)	33.6 (92.5)	37.7 (99.9)	36.7 (98.1)	34.2 (93.6)	28.8 (83.8)	22.4 (72.3)	12.0 (53.6)	37.7 (99.9)
Mean daily maximum °C (°F)	−3.0 (26.6)	0.4 (32.7)	8.6 (47.5)	17.8 (64.0)	21.9 (71.4)	25.2 (77.4)	27.3 (81.1)	27.1 (80.8)	23.1 (73.6)	15.9 (60.6)	6.7 (44.1)	−0.8 (30.6)	14.2 (57.5)
Daily mean °C (°F)	−9.7 (14.5)	−6.1 (21.0)	1.9 (35.4)	10.1 (50.2)	14.5 (58.1)	17.8 (64.0)	19.5 (67.1)	18.8 (65.8)	14.7 (58.5)	7.7 (45.9)	0.1 (32.2)	−6.9 (19.6)	6.9 (44.4)
Mean daily minimum °C (°F)	−14.3 (6.3)	−10.9 (12.4)	−3.2 (26.2)	4.0 (39.2)	8.3 (46.9)	11.6 (52.9)	13.1 (55.6)	12.0 (53.6)	7.8 (46.0)	1.9 (35.4)	−4.2 (24.4)	−10.9 (12.4)	1.3 (34.3)
Record low °C (°F)	−27.5 (−17.5)	−27.2 (−17.0)	−17.8 (0.0)	−12.9 (8.8)	−2.5 (27.5)	2.7 (36.9)	4.9 (40.8)	0.0 (32.0)	−3.3 (26.1)	−10.1 (13.8)	−20.0 (−4.0)	−28.3 (−18.9)	−28.3 (−18.9)
Average precipitation mm (inches)	8.1 (0.32)	8.0 (0.31)	18.1 (0.71)	46.5 (1.83)	64.5 (2.54)	75.8 (2.98)	67.9 (2.67)	51.3 (2.02)	34.8 (1.37)	26.3 (1.04)	18.8 (0.74)	9.8 (0.39)	429.9 (16.92)
Average precipitation days (≥ 0.1 mm)	5.4	5.8	7.3	10.2	12.9	14.6	14.6	12.3	8.3	7.1	7.1	6.1	111.7
Average snowy days	8.1	9.4	6.7	2.1	0.4	0	0	0	0.1	2.4	7.1	9.4	45.7
Average relative humidity (%)	69	69	67	60	60	64	63	61	59	65	71	71	65
Mean monthly sunshine hours	162.7	168.3	208.7	232.2	260.8	256.9	281.8	279.1	251.8	217.0	152.2	141.3	2,612.8
Percentage possible sunshine	55	56	56	57	57	56	61	66	69	65	53	51	59
Source: China Meteorological Administrationall-time extreme temperature

== Demographics ==
Breakdown of nationalities in Tekes County
Nationality	Percentage
Kazakhs	44.4%
Han	18.3%
Huis	14.4%
Uyghurs	11.7%
Kyrgyz	6.7%
Mongols	2.6%
Others	1.9%
Source of the population statistics :
