= Xinjiang Uygur Autonomous Regional People's Congress =

Regional government in China

Xinjiang Uygur Autonomous Regional People's Congress 新疆维吾尔自治区人民代表大会 شىنجاڭ ئۇيغۇر ئاپتونوم رايونلۇق خەلق قۇرۇلتىيى
- 14th Xinjiang Uygur Autonomous Regional People's Congress

Type
- Type: Unicameral; Province-level people's congress
- Established: 1956

Leadership
- Director of the Standing Committee: Zumret Obul
- Vice Director of the Standing Committee: Li Ningping; Tohti Yaqup; Muqïyat Jarmuqamet; Dilshat Kidirhan; Ping Xinlai; Wang Guohe; Memtimin Qadir
- Secretary-General of the Standing Committee: Mutellip Rozi

Structure
- Committees: Standing Committee of the Xinjiang Uygur Autonomous Regional People's Congress
- Length of term: 5 years

Website
- www.xjpcsc.gov.cn

Constitution
- Constitution of the People's Republic of China

The People's Congress of the Xinjiang Uygur Autonomous Region is the people's congress of the Xinjiang Uygur Autonomous Region. The 2nd session of the Xinjiang Uygur Autonomous Regional People's Congress in 1956 officially announced the founding of the Xinjiang Uygur Autonomous Region and the regional government, following decisions taken by the National People's Congress of the People's Republic of China.

== History ==
On September 13, 1955, the Twenty-first Session of the Standing Committee of the National People's Congress passed a resolution to establish the Xinjiang Uygur Autonomous Region, thereby dissolving Xinjiang Province and adopting the administrative territory of the former Xinjiang Province. In 1956, the inaugural People's Congress of the Xinjiang Uygur Autonomous Region was convened.

In July 1979, the Second Session of the 5th National People's Congress enacted the "Resolution on the Amendment of Certain Provisions of the Constitution of the People's Republic of China", which mandated that "local people's congresses at all levels above the county and the county level shall establish standing committees, which shall serve as the permanent organs of the people's congresses at their respective levels." From August 26, 1979, to September 5, 1979, the Second Session of the Fifth People's Congress of the Xinjiang Uygur Autonomous Region was held to elect the Standing Committee of the Fifth People's Congress of the Autonomous Region. On September 7, 1979, the inaugural meeting of the Standing Committee was held, during which the establishment of the offices for the Standing Committee of the People's Congress of the Autonomous Region was resolved.

== Leaderships of the Standing Committee ==
1st–4th Congress
no standing committee

5th Congress

- Term: September 1979–April 1983
- Director: Tömür Dawamat
- Vice-director: Tan Youlin, Wang Zhenwen, Ergali Abilqaiyr, Yang Yiqing, Sidiq Musayev, Lu Xuebin, Mahinur Qasimi, Zhang Fengqi, Zhao Yuzheng, Yu Zhanlin, Amantur Bayzak, Tursun Atawulla, Meqsud Teyipov, Wang Heting, Seydulla Seypullayev (added December 1980), Liu Sicong (added December 1980)
- Secretary-General: Wang Zhenwen

6th Congress

- Term: April 1983–January 1988
- Director: Tömür Dawamat→Hamudun Niyaz (elected December 1985)
- Vice-director: Seydulla Seypullayev, Yang Yiqing, Lu Xuebin (resigned May 1985), Cao Budanov Zayir, Ren Gebai (resigned June 1986), Abliz Muhemmed, Huang Yuchen, Mahinur Qasimi, Yu Zhanlin, Amantur Bayzak, Meqsud Teyipov, Wang Heting, Qusaiyn Siyabaev, Xia'erxibieke Sidike (elected June 1984), Li Jiayu (elected December 1985), Zhang Shaopeng (elected June 1986)

7th Congress

- Term: January 1988–January 1993
- Director: Hamudun Niyaz
- Vice-director: Li Jiayu, Cao Budanov Zayir, Mahinur Qasimi, Chen Xifu (resigned May 1991), Meqsud Teyipov, Xia'erxibieke Sidike, Zhang Shaopeng, Ma Mingliang, Kurmanali Ospanuly, Abdurehim Litip, Xu Peng, Tu'erbayi'er, Zhang Sixue (added May 1991), Shi Geng (added May 1991), Ablayow (added May 1991)
- Secretary-General: Yasin Nasir

8th Congress

- Term: January 1993–May 1998
- Director: Hamudun Niyaz
- Vice-director: Xie Fuping, Heyderbeg (resigned April 1996), Yusup Muhemmed, Tu'erbayi'er, Xu Peng, Ma Cunliang, Xie Hong (removed February 1995), Hojihan Hekimov, Amine Ghappar, Qadys Zhanabiluly (added April 1996), Cui Guanghua (added April 1996)
- Secretary-General: Memet Ismayil

9th Congress

- Term: May 1998–January 2003
- Director: Hamudun Niyaz
- Vice-director: Li Fengzi, Helchem Islam, Xu Peng (resigned January 2001), Zhang Heng, Mijit Nasir, Qadys Zhanabiluly, Hojihan Hekimov, Sulaiyiman Nietikabuli (resigned January 2001), Ma Jianguo, Abdurehim Amet (added January 2001), Wang Huaiyu (added January 2001), Ashanbaike Tu'erdi (added January 2001)
- Secretary-General: Memet Ismayil (resigned June 2000), Memet Rejep (elected January 2001)

10th Congress

- Term: January 2003–January 2008
- Director: Ablet Abdureshit→Abdurehim Amet (elected January 2004)
- Vice-director: Abdurehim Amet, Wang Huaiyu (resigned January 2006), Helchem Islam, Dalelhan Mamyrhanuly, Memetimin Zakir, Hojihan Hekimov, Ma Jianguo, Song Ruhu, Ashanbaike Tu'erdi, Du Qinrui, Zhang Guoliang (added January 2006)
- Secretary-General: Memet Rejep

11th Congress

- Term: January 2008–January 2013
- Director: Arken Imirbaki
- Vice-director: Zhang Guoliang (resigned January 2012), Alpysbai Rakhimuly (resigned January 2012), Du Qinrui, Li Zhi, Neyim Yasin (resigned January 2012), Memetimin Yasin, Qiao Jifu, Ma Mingchng, Wang Huimin (added January 2012), Mawken Seyitqamzaüli (added January 2012), Mutellip Qasim (added January 2012)
- Secretary-General: Nishan Ibrahim (resigned January 2012)

12th Congress

- Term: January 2013–January 2018
- Director: Arken Imirbaki→Shohrat Zakir (January–December 2014)→Neyim Yasin (elected January 2015)
- Vice-director: Wang Yongming, Jappar Hebibulla (resigned January 2016), Ma Mingcheng, Tilepaldı Äbdiraşïd (resigned January 2016), Wang Huimin (resigned January 2014), Mutellip Qasim (resigned December 2014), Horigul Jappar, Dong Xinguang, Zhang Bo (elected January 2015), Nijat Sultan (elected January 2015), Manen Zeyneluly (elected January 2016), Inam Nesirdin (elected January 2016), Qian Zhi (elected January 2017)
- Secretary-General: Asqar Tursun

13th Congress

- Term: January 2018–January 2023
- Director: Shewket Imin
- Vice-director: Zhu Hailun (resigned February 2021), Li Xuejun, Wang Yongming (resigned February 2021), Mutellip Qasim (resigned February 2021), Dong Xinguang, Badai (resigned February 2022), Kulshat Abduqadir (resigned February 2021), Manen Zeyneluly (elected February 2021), Zumret Obul (February–November 2021), Tohti Yaqup (elected February 2021), Muqïyat Jarmuqamet (elected February 2021), Sarqıt Aqanulı (elected January 2022), Zhao Qing (elected January 2022), Qadirbek Qamza (elected January 2022)
- Secretary-General: Wang Yongming (resigned February 2021), Mutellip Rozi (added February 2021)

14th Congress

- Term: January 2023–present
- Director: Zumret Obul
- Vice-director: Li Ningping, Tohti Yaqup, Muqïyat Jarmuqamet, Dilshat Kidirhan, Ping Xinlai, Wang Guohe, Memtimin Qadir
- Secretary-General: Mutellip Rozi

== See also ==
- System of people's congress
