= Menglik Siyit =

Chinese politician (born 1962)

- مەڭلىك سىيىت

Vice Chairman of Xinjiang Uyghur Autonomous Region
- Incumbent
- Assumed office January 2018
- Chairman: Shohrat Zakir; Erkin Tuniyaz

Mayor of Turpan
- In office May 2016 – January 2018
- Party Secretary: Zhang Wenquan; Zhang Wensheng
- Preceded by: Elixan Osman
- Succeeded by: Memtimin Qadir

Personal details
- Born: September 1962 (age 64) Shanshan County, Xinjiang, China
- Party: Chinese Communist Party
- Education: Xinjiang University; Central Party School of the Chinese Communist Party

Chinese name
- Chinese: 芒力克·斯依提
Transcriptions
Standard Mandarin
- Hanyu Pinyin: Mánglìkè Sīyītí

Menglik Siyit (Uyghur: مەڭلىك سىيىت; Chinese: 芒力克·斯依提; born September 1962) is a Chinese politician of Uyghur ethnicity who is the current vice chairman of Xinjiang Uyghur Autonomous Region.

== Biography ==
Menglik Siyit was born in Shanshan County, Xinjiang, in September 1962. In 1981, he was admitted to Xinjiang Institute of Technology (now Xinjiang University), majoring in inorganic chemical. After graduation, he worked at the university.

He joined the Chinese Communist Party in November 1984, and got involved in politics in September 1998, when he was appointed vice mayor of Hami, and ten years later was promoted to the mayor position. He was deputy party secretary of Kizilsu Kyrgyz Autonomous Prefecture and secretary of its Prefectural Political and Legal Affairs Commission in September 2012, and held that office until March 2013. In May 2016, he was transferred to Turpan, where he was named acting mayor in June of that same year and installed as mayor in February 2017. In January 2018, he was elevated to vice chairman of Xinjiang Uyghur Autonomous Region.

Government offices
Preceded by Elixan Osman	Mayor of Turpan; 2016–2018	Succeeded by Memtimin Qadir
