= Qadirbek Qamza =

Chinese politician

- قادىربەك قامزا; Қадырбек Қамза

Vice Chairman of the Standing Committee of the People's Congress of Xinjiang Uygur Autonomous Region
- Incumbent
- Assumed office 28 January 2022
- Chairman: Shewket Imin

Vice Chairman of Xinjiang Uygur Autonomous Region
- In office January 2018 – January 2022
- Chairman: Shohrat Zakir; Erkin Tuniyaz

Personal details
- Born: December 1961 (age 64) Emin County, Xinjiang, China
- Party: Chinese Communist Party
- Education: Xinjiang Political and Legal Cadre Management College; Central Party School of the Chinese Communist Party; Tianjin University

Chinese name
- Simplified Chinese: 哈德尔别克·哈木扎
- Traditional Chinese: 哈德爾别克·哈木扎
Transcriptions
Standard Mandarin
- Hanyu Pinyin: Hādé'ěrbiékè Hāmùzhā

Qadirbek Qamza (Kazakh: قادىربەك قامزا / Қадырбек Қамза; Chinese: 哈德尔别克·哈木扎; born December 1961) is a Chinese politician of Kazakh ethnicity who is the current vice chairman of the Standing Committee of the People's Congress of Xinjiang Uygur Autonomous Region.

== Biography ==
Qadirbek Qamza was born in Emin County, Xinjiang, in December 1961. He entered the workforce in May 1982, and joined the Chinese Communist Party in December 1986. He worked in the Tacheng Branch of Ili Kazakh Autonomous Prefecture People's Procuratorate before being promoted to assistant magistrate of Toli County in May 1995. He was deputy party secretary of Yumin County in December 1996, and held that office until July 2002, when he was appointed deputy party secretary and magistrate of Shawan County. In January 2005, he became secretary-general of Tacheng Prefecture and was assigned to vice political commissar of the 9th Division of Xinjiang Production and Construction Corps in January 2006. In May 2008, he was made deputy secretary-general of Xinjiang Uyghur Autonomous Region. He was appointed head of the Department of Land and Resources of Xinjiang Uygur Autonomous Region in July 2016, concurrently serving as vice chairman of Xinjiang Uyghur Autonomous Region in January 2018. He also served as head of the Department of Natural Resources of Xinjiang Uygur Autonomous Region from November 2018 to April 2021. In January 2022, he was proposed as vice chairman of the Standing Committee of the People's Congress of Xinjiang Uygur Autonomous Region.

Government offices
Preceded by Kaderkhan Miraskhan (卡德尔汗·米拉斯汗)	Head of the Department of Land and Resources of Xinjiang Uygur Autonomous Region; 2016–2018	Succeeded by Position revoked
New title	Head of the Department of Natural Resources of Xinjiang Uygur Autonomous Region; 2018–2021	Succeeded by Don'atar Krimahon (唐阿塔尔·克里马洪)
