= Jërullah Hesamidin =

Chinese Uyghur politician

- جەرۇللاھ ھېسامىدىن

Vice Chairman of Xinjiang Uyghur Autonomous Region
- Incumbent
- Assumed office January 2013
- Chairman: Erkin Tuniyaz

Mayor of Ürümqi
- In office February 2009 – January 2013
- Party Secretary: Li Zhi→Zhu Hailun
- Preceded by: Neyim Yasin
- Succeeded by: Ilham Sabir

Personal details
- Born: June 1962 (age 64) Artux, Xinjiang, China
- Party: Chinese Communist Party
- Education: China Youth University of Political Studies; Tianjin University; Central Party School of the Chinese Communist Party; Xinjiang University of Finance and Economics

Chinese name
- Simplified Chinese: 吉尔拉·衣沙木丁
- Traditional Chinese: 吉爾拉·衣沙木丁
Transcriptions
Standard Mandarin
- Hanyu Pinyin: Jí'ěrlā Yīshāmùdīng

Jërullah Hesamidin (Uyghur: جەرۇللاھ ھېسامىدىن, romanized: Jërullah Hesamidin; born June 1962) is a Chinese politician of Uyghur origin who has been vice chairman of Xinjiang Uyghur Autonomous Region since January 2013. He previously served as mayor of Ürümqi, the capital of Xinjiang, from 2009 to 2013.

== Biography ==
Jërullah Hesamidin was born in Artux, Xinjiang, in June 1962. He entered the workforce in November 1980, and joined the Chinese Communist Party (CCP) in December 1986. He studied as a part-time student at China Youth University of Political Studies, Tianjin University, Central Party School of the Chinese Communist Party and Xinjiang University of Finance and Economics.

He served in various posts in Kashgar Prefecture before serving as magistrate of Yopurga County in March 1994. He was eventually promoted to vice governor in March 1999. In February 2005, he was assigned to Aksu Prefecture and appointed governor, a position he held until February 2008. In February 2008, he was named acting mayor of Ürümqi, a major city and the capital of Xinjiang. He was installed as mayor in February 2009. In January 2013, he rose to become vice chairman of Xinjiang Uyghur Autonomous Region.

Government offices
Preceded by Neyim Yasin	Mayor of Ürümqi; 2009–2013	Succeeded by Ilham Sabir
