= People's Government of the Xinjiang Uygur Autonomous Region =

Provincial government in Xinjiang Uygur Autonomous Region, China

Xinjiang Uygur Autonomous Region People's Government 新疆维吾尔自治区人民政府
- Established: December 17, 1949

Leadership
- Chairman: Erkin Tuniyaz since 27 January 2022
- Executive Deputy Governor: Chen Weijun
- Deputy Governors: Yüsüpjan Memet, Sun Hongmei, Xue Bin, Wang Gang, Qeyser Abdukerim, Zhu Lifan, Pan Xi
- Parent body: Central People's Government; Xinjiang Uygur Autonomous Region People's Congress
- Elected by: Xinjiang Uygur Autonomous Region People's Congress

The People's Government of Xinjiang Uygur Autonomous Region (Chinese: 新疆维吾尔自治区人民政府), Uyghur: شىنجاڭ ئۇيغۇر ئاپتونوم رايونلۇق خەلق ھۆكۈمىتى, or Xinjiang Uygur Autonomous Region People's Government (Chinese: 新疆维吾尔自治区政府), is the provincial-level state administrative organ of Xinjiang Uygur Autonomous Region, People's Republic of China.

== History ==
The peaceful liberation of Xinjiang took place in September 1949. In October 1949, the Central Committee of the Chinese Communist Party established its Xinjiang branch. Peng Dehuai convened the inaugural plenary meeting of the Founding Assembly of the Xinjiang Provincial People's Government on December 17, 1949, officially announcing the establishment of the Xinjiang Provincial People's Government.

Simultaneously, the Xinjiang Military District was established, and in January 1950, the 14th Political Affairs Conference of the Central People's Government sanctioned the "Current Policy of the Xinjiang Provincial People's Government Committee." In 1955, Xinjiang was rebranded as the Xinjiang Uygur Autonomous Region.

== Organization ==
According to the Institutional Reform Program, the People's Government of the has set up 23 constituent departments, 1 Directly Managed Organization, 10 Directly Affiliated Organization, and 5 departmental management organizations.

The People's Government of has set up the following organizations:

- General Office

Component Departments

- Development and Reform Commission
- Department of Education
- Department of Science and Technology
- Department of Industry and Information Technology
- Ethnic Affairs Commission
- Department of Public Security
- Department of Civil Affairs of
- Department of Justice
- Department of Finance of
- Department of Human Resources and Social Security
- Department of Natural Resources
- Department of Housing and Urban-Rural Development
- Department of Ecological Environment
- Department of Transportation
- Water Resources Department
- Department of Agriculture and Rural Development
- Department of Commerce
- Department of Culture and Tourism
- Health Commission
- Department of Retired Military Personnel Affairs
- Emergency Management Department
- Foreign Affairs Office
- Audit Office

Directly Managed Organization

- State-owned Assets Supervision and Administration Commission

Directly Affiliated Organization

- Research Office
- Market Supervision and Administration Bureau
- Radio and Television Bureau
- Statistics Bureau
- Organ Affairs Administration
- Local Financial Supervision Administration
- Bureau of Letters and Calls
- Forestry and Grassland Bureau
- Rural Revitalization Bureau
- People's Air Defense Office

Directly Affiliated Institutions

- Xinjiang International Expo Affairs Bureau
- Counselor's Office
- Nonferrous Geological Exploration Bureau
- Xishan Coal Mine Retention Office
- Xinjiang Today

Dispatch Organizations

- Office in Beijing
- Office in Xi'an
- Office in Guangzhou
- Office in Shanghai
