= Chairman of Xinjiang =

Government position

Chairman of the Xinjiang Uygur Autonomous Region People's Government
- 新疆维吾尔自治区人民政府主席
- National Emblem of China

- Flag of China

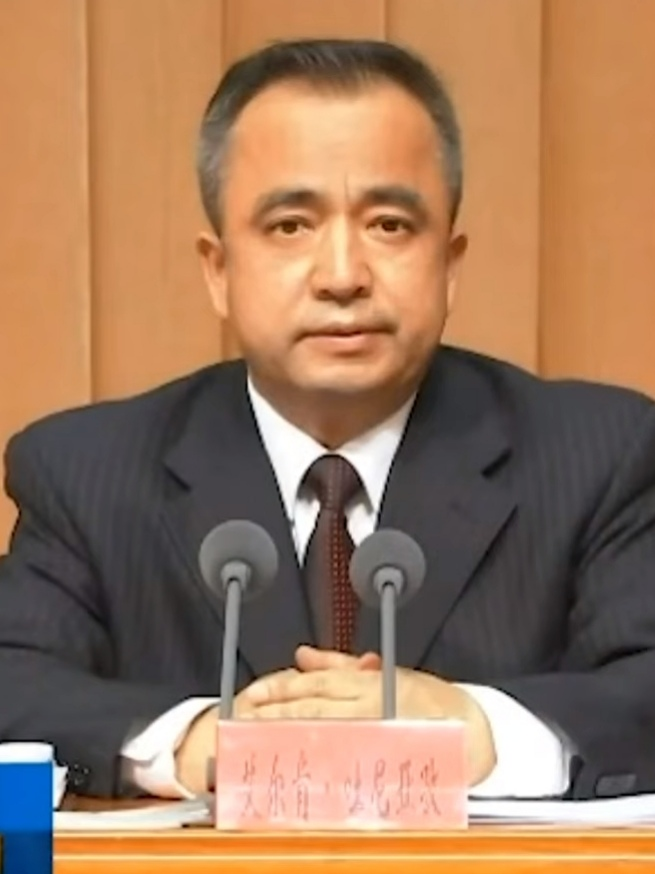
- Incumbent; Erkin Tuniyaz since 30 September 2021
- People's Government of the Xinjiang Uygur Autonomous Region
- Type: Head of government
- Status: Provincial and ministerial-level official
- Reports to: Xinjiang Uygur Autonomous Region People's Congress and its Standing Committee
- Nominator: Presidium of the Xinjiang Uygur Autonomous Region People's Congress
- Appointer: Xinjiang Uygur Autonomous Region People's Congress
- Term length: Five years, renewable
- Inaugural holder: Burhan Shahidi
- Formation: October 1949
- Deputy: Deputy Chairperson; Secretary-General

The Chairman of the Xinjiang Uygur Autonomous Region People's Government is the head of the Xinjiang Uygur Autonomous Region and leader of the People's Government of the Xinjiang Uygur Autonomous Region.

The chairperson is elected by the Xinjiang Uygur Autonomous Regional People's Congress, and responsible to it and its Standing Committee. The chairperson is a provincial level official and is responsible for the overall decision-making of the regional government. The chairperson is assisted by an executive vice chairperson as well as several vice chairpersons. The chairperson generally serves as the deputy secretary of the Xinjiang Uygur Autonomous Regional Committee of the Chinese Communist Party and as a member of the CCP Central Committee. The chairperson is the second-highest-ranking official in the autonomous region after the secretary of the CCP Xinjiang Committee. The government chairman is always an Uyghur. The current chairperson is Erkin Tuniyaz, who took office on 30 September 2021.

== List ==
=== Republic of China ===
Non-partisan/ unknown Warlords People's Anti-Imperialist Association Kuomintang (Nationalist)

==== Chairperson of the Provincial Government (Mainland era) ====
No.	Portrait	Name (Birth–death)	Term of office		Political Party
1		Yang Zengxin 楊增新 Yáng Zēngxīn (1864–1928)	1912	July 7, 1928	Xinjiang clique
1		Yang Zengxin 楊增新 Yáng Zēngxīn (1864–1928)	Assassinated.		
2		Jin Shuren 金樹仁 Jīn Shùrén (1879–1941)	July 7, 1928	April 12, 1933	Xinjiang clique
2		Jin Shuren 金樹仁 Jīn Shùrén (1879–1941)	Deposed in a coup.		
3		Liu Wenlong 劉文龍 Liú Wénlóng (1870–1950)	April 14, 1933	September 1933	
3		Liu Wenlong 劉文龍 Liú Wénlóng (1870–1950)	Removed from office and placed under house arrest by Sheng Shicai.		
–		Zhu Ruichi 朱瑞墀 Zhū Ruìchí (1862–1934)	September 1933	March 5, 1934	
–		Zhu Ruichi 朱瑞墀 Zhū Ruìchí (1862–1934)	Figurehead chairman appointed by Sheng Shicai and not recognized by the Central government. Died in office.		
4		Li Rong 李溶 Lǐ Róng (1870–1940)	October 1934	March 21, 1940	
4		Li Rong 李溶 Lǐ Róng (1870–1940)	Figurehead chairman. Died in office.		
5		Sheng Shicai 盛世才 Shèng Shìcái (1895–1970)	April 4, 1940	August 29, 1944	People's Anti-Imperialist Association
		Sheng Shicai 盛世才 Shèng Shìcái (1895–1970)	April 4, 1940	August 29, 1944	Kuomintang
		Sheng Shicai 盛世才 Shèng Shìcái (1895–1970)	Recognized by the Central government only as a duban (military governor), Sheng was de facto ruler of Sinkiang from 1933. In 1940, the Central government recognized him as Provincial chairman. Removed from office.		
6		Wu Zhongxin 吳忠信 Wú Zhōngxìn (1884–1959)	August 29, 1944	March 29, 1946	Kuomintang
6		Wu Zhongxin 吳忠信 Wú Zhōngxìn (1884–1959)	Resigned.		
7		Zhang Zhizhong 張治中 Zhāng Zhìzhōng (1895–1969)	March 1946	June 1947	Kuomintang
7		Zhang Zhizhong 張治中 Zhāng Zhìzhōng (1895–1969)	Removed from office.		
8		Masud Sabri 麥斯武德 مەسئۇت سابرى (1887–1952)	June 1947	January 1949	Kuomintang
8		Masud Sabri 麥斯武德 مەسئۇت سابرى (1887–1952)	First Uighur governor and first non-Han Governor in China during the twentieth century. Appointed during the Ili Rebellion.		
9		Burhan Shahidi 包爾漢 بۇرھان شەھىدى (1894–1989)	January 1949	September 26, 1949	Kuomintang
9		Burhan Shahidi 包爾漢 بۇرھان شەھىدى (1894–1989)	Surrendered to the People's Liberation Army.		

==== Xinjiang Provincial Government Office era ====
===== Chairperson of the Provincial Government =====
No.	Portrait	Name (Birth–death)	Term of office		Political party
1		Yulbars Khan 堯樂博士 يۇلبارس خان (1888–1971)	April 11, 1950	July 27, 1971	Kuomintang
1		Yulbars Khan 堯樂博士 يۇلبارس خان (1888–1971)	Died in office.		

===== Director, Xinjiang Provincial Government Office =====
No.	Portrait	Name (Birth–death)	Term of office		Political party
1		Yao Tao-hung 堯道宏 Yáo Dàohóng (1913–1991)	July 27, 1971	?	Kuomintang
1		Yao Tao-hung 堯道宏 Yáo Dàohóng (1913–1991)	Son of Yulbars Khan.		
2		Hou Chi-yu 侯紀峪 Hóu Jìyù	?	January 16, 1992	Kuomintang
2		Hou Chi-yu 侯紀峪 Hóu Jìyù	Post abolished.		

=== People's Republic of China ===
No.	Officeholder	Term of office		Party	Ref.
No.	Officeholder	Took office	Left office	Party	Ref.
Governor of the Xinjiang Provincial People's Government
1	Burhan Shahidi (1894–1989)	October 1949	January 1955	Chinese Communist Party	
Chairman of the Xinjiang Uygur Autonomous Region People's Committee
2	Saifuddin Azizi (1915–2003)	October 1955	January 1967	Chinese Communist Party	
Chairman of the Xinjiang Uygur Autonomous Region Revolutionary Committee
3	Long Shujin (1910–2003)	1968	July 1972	Chinese Communist Party	
4	Saifuddin Azizi (1915–2003)	1972	1978	Chinese Communist Party	
5	Wang Feng (1910–1998)	1978	1979	Chinese Communist Party	
Chairman of the Xinjiang Uygur Autonomous Region People's Government
6	Ismail Amat (1935–2018)	1979	1985	Chinese Communist Party	
7	Tömür Dawamat (1927–2018)	1985	1993	Chinese Communist Party	
8	Ablet Abdureshit (born 1938)	January 1993	January 2003	Chinese Communist Party	
9	Ismail Tiliwaldi (born 1944)	January 2003	December 2007	Chinese Communist Party	
10	Nur Bekri (born 1961)	22 January 2008	31 December 2014	Chinese Communist Party	
11	Shohrat Zakir (born 1953)	24 January 2015	30 September 2021	Chinese Communist Party	
12	Erkin Tuniyaz (born 1961)	27 January 2022 (acting from 30 September 2021)	Incumbent	Chinese Communist Party	
