= Abdurehim Amet =

Chinese politician

- ئابدۇرەھىم ئامەت

Chairman of the Standing Committee of the People's Congress of Xinjiang Uygur Autonomous Region
- In office January 2004 – January 2008
- Preceded by: Ablet Abdureshit
- Succeeded by: Arken Imirbaki

Personal details
- Born: September 1942 (age 83) Shufu County, Xinjiang, Republic of China
- Party: Chinese Communist Party
- Education: Xinjiang University

Chinese name
- Simplified Chinese: 阿不都热依木·阿米提
- Traditional Chinese: 阿不都熱依木·阿米提
Transcriptions
Standard Mandarin
- Hanyu Pinyin: Ābùdūrèyīmù Āmǐtí

Abdurehim Amet (Uyghur: ئابدۇرەھىم ئامەت, romanized: Abdurehim Amet; born September 1942) is a Chinese politician of Uyghur origin who served as chairman of the Standing Committee of the People's Congress of Xinjiang Uygur Autonomous Region between 2004 and 2008. He was a delegate to the 11th National People's Congress.

== Biography ==
Abdurehim Amet was born in Shufu County, Xinjiang, in September 1942, during the Republic of China. In 1959, he enrolled at Xinjiang Institute of Technology (now Xinjiang University), majoring in machine manufacturing. After graduation, he taught at Yuzi People's Commune in Turpan for a short while before becoming involved in politics in June 1965. He joined the Chinese Communist Party in May 1965. In January 1975, he was promoted to magistrate and deputy party secretary of Yining County, he remained in that position until January 1977, when he was transferred to Nilka County and appointed party secretary, the top political position in the county.

In January 1979, he was assigned to Ürümqi and worked in the United Front Work Department. In April 1983, he became deputy secretary of Xinjiang Regional Commission for Discipline Inspection, the party's agency in charge of anti-corruption efforts. In March 1993, he was promoted to member of the standing committee of the CPC Xinjiang Regional Committee, the region's top authority. In January 2001, he became vice chairman of the Standing Committee of the People's Congress of Xinjiang Uygur Autonomous Region, rising to chairman in January 2004.

In March 2008, he was appointed vice chairperson of National People's Congress Ethnic Affairs Committee, serving in the post until his retirement in March 2013.

Assembly seats
| Preceded by Ablet Abdureshit | Chairman of the Standing Committee of the People's Congress of Xinjiang Uygur Autonomous Region; 2004–2008 | Succeeded by Arken Imirbaki |
