= Yasin Sadiq =

Chinese politician

- ياسىن سادىق

Secretary-General of Xinjiang Uygur Autonomous Region People's Government
- In office 27 May 2021 – 5 April 2023
- Governor: Erkin Tuniyaz
- Preceded by: Toxti Yaqup
- Succeeded by: TBA

Mayor of Ürümqi
- In office January 2018 – April 2021
- Party Secretary: Xu Hairong
- Preceded by: Ilham Sabir
- Succeeded by: Memtimin Qadir

Personal details
- Born: June 1968 (age 58) Hami, Xinjiang, China
- Party: Chinese Communist Party
- Education: Northwest Minzu University; Central Party School of the Chinese Communist Party

Yasin Sadiq (Uyghur: ياسىن سادىق, romanized: Yasin Sadiq; Chinese: 牙生·司地克; pinyin: Yáshēng Sīdìkè; born June 1968) is a Chinese politician of Uyghur origin who was secretary-general of Xinjiang Uygur Autonomous Region People's Government from 2021 to 2023. He previously served as mayor of Ürümqi, the capital of Xinjiang, from 2018 to 2021. He is a delegate to the 13th National People's Congress. He surrendered himself to and is cooperating with the Central Commission for Discipline Inspection (CCDI) and National Commission of Supervision for investigation of "suspected violations of disciplines and laws" in April 2023.

== Biography ==
Yasin Sadiq was born in Hami, Xinjiang, in June 1968. In 1988, he enrolled in Northwest Minzu University, majoring in Chinese language and literature, where he graduated in 1992. He joined the Chinese Communist Party (CCP) in July 1993.

He served in various posts in Hami before serving as vice mayor in August 2008. In October 2016, he was assigned to Kashgar Prefecture as deputy party secretary and secretary of its Commission for Discipline Inspection, the party's agency in charge of anti-corruption efforts. In November 2017, he became deputy party secretary and vice mayor of Ürümqi, a major city and the capital of Xinjiang, rising to mayor in January 2018. On 27 May 2021, he took office as secretary-general of Xinjiang Uygur Autonomous Region People's Government, replacing Toxti Yaqup.

== Investigation ==
On 6 April 2023, he handed himself in to by the Central Commission for Discipline Inspection (CCDI), the party's internal disciplinary body, and the National Supervisory Commission, the highest anti-corruption agency of China.

Government offices
Preceded by Ilham Sabir	Mayor of Ürümqi; 2018–2021	Succeeded by Memtimin Qadir
Preceded by Toxti Yaqup	Secretary-General of Xinjiang Uygur Autonomous Region People's Government; 2021–2023	Succeeded by Zhou Xuyong
