= Zhu Hailun =

Chinese politician

- 朱海仑

Vice Chairman of the Standing Committee of the People's Congress of Xinjiang Uygur Autonomous Region
- In office January 2019 – February 2021
- Chairman: Shewket Imin

Communist Party Secretary of Ürümqi
- In office September 2009 – May 2016
- Deputy: Jërullah Hesamidin→Ilham Sabir (mayor)
- Preceded by: Li Zhi
- Succeeded by: Li Xuejun

Secretary of the Xinjiang Regional Political and Legal Affairs Commission
- In office May 2016 – January 2019
- Preceded by: Xiong Xuanguo
- Succeeded by: Wang Junzheng
- In office October 2006 – September 2009
- Preceded by: Zhang Xiuming
- Succeeded by: Fu Qiang

Communist Party Secretary of Hetian Prefecture
- In office December 2003 – October 2006
- Preceded by: Wang Jinggan
- Succeeded by: Cheng Zhenshan

Personal details
- Born: 1 January 1958 (age 68) Lianshui County, Zhejiang, China
- Party: Chinese Communist Party
- Education: Central Party School of the Chinese Communist Party

Chinese name
- Simplified Chinese: 朱海仑
- Traditional Chinese: 朱海侖
Transcriptions
Standard Mandarin
- Hanyu Pinyin: Zhū Hǎilún

Zhu Hailun (Chinese: 朱海仑; born 1 January 1958) is a retired Chinese politician who served as vice chairman of the Standing Committee of the People's Congress of Xinjiang Uygur Autonomous Region from 2019 until 2021. Previously he served as the deputy party secretary of the Xinjiang Uyghur Autonomous Region. Between 2009 and 2016, Zhu was the party chief of Urumqi, the capital of the Xinjiang region.

== Biography ==
Zhu, who is a member of China's ethnic Han majority, was born in Lianshui County, Jiangsu. In 1975, Zhu was sent to Kargilik County, Kashgar Prefecture, Xinjiang in the Down to the Countryside Movement. Zhu joined the Chinese Communist Party (CCP) in May 1980. He attended school at the Xinjiang Party School. He served successively as the party chief of Kashgar (county-level city), deputy party chief and later party chief of Hotan. By the 1990s, he was fluent in the Uyghur language. In October 2006, he was named a member of the regional CCP Standing Committee and the head of the regional Political and Legal Affairs Commission, an important post overseeing internal security and law enforcement. In September 2009, he was named party chief of Urumqi after months of unrest in the capital. In April 2016, he was named deputy party chief of Xinjiang. According to the International Consortium of Investigative Journalists (ICIJ), Zhu had a major role on the strategic planning of the Xinjiang re-education camps.

On 9 July 2020, US Secretary of State Michael Pompeo announced that Zhu Hailun and his immediate family members were ineligible for entry into the United States due to Zhu's involvement in gross violations of human rights.

On 22 March 2021, Zhu was sanctioned by the European Union and the United Kingdom. The Council cited his involvement in the re-education camps in Xinjiang, noting that "as Secretary of the Political and Legal Affairs Committee of the Xinjiang Autonomous Region (2016 to 2019), Zhu Hailun was responsible for maintaining internal security and law enforcement in the XUAR. As such, he held a key political position in charge of overseeing and implementing a large-scale surveillance, detention and indoctrination programme targeting Uyghurs and people from other Muslim ethnic minorities. Zhu Hailun has been described as the 'architect' of this programme. He is therefore responsible for serious human rights violations in China, in particular large-scale arbitrary detentions inflicted upon Uyghurs and people from other Muslim ethnic minorities." As a second reason for adding him to the sanctions list, the EU added that "as Deputy Head of the 13th People's Congress of the XUAR (2019 to February 2021), Zhu Hailun continued to exercise a decisive influence in the XUAR where the large-scale surveillance, detention and indoctrination programme targeting Uyghurs and people from other Muslim ethnic minorities continues."

Zhu is also on the Canadian Consolidated Sanctions List.

== See also ==
- China Cables
- Uyghur Human Rights Policy Act

Party political offices
Preceded by Wang Jinggan	Communist Party Secretary of Hetian Prefecture; 2003–2006	Succeeded by Cheng Zhenshan
Preceded by Zhang Xiuming	Secretary of the Xinjiang Regional Political and Legal Affairs Commission; 2006–2009	Succeeded by Fu Qiang
Preceded by Li Zhi	Secretary of the Xinjiang Regional Political and Legal Affairs Commission; 2009–2016	Succeeded by Li Xuejun
Preceded by Li Zhi	Communist Party Secretary of Ürümqi; 2009–2016	Succeeded by Li Xuejun
