= Zumret Obul =

Chinese politician

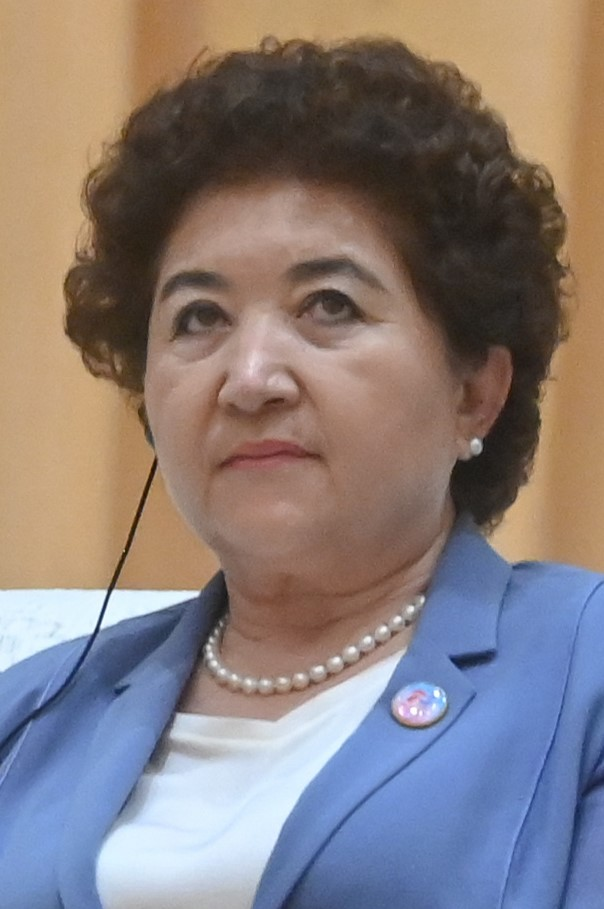
- Obul in 2024

Chair of the Standing Committee of the Xinjiang Uyghur Autonomous Regional People's Congress
- Incumbent
- Assumed office 18 January 2023
- Preceded by: Shewket Imin

Member of the National People's Congress
- In office 2018–2023

Mayor of Hami
- In office February 2017 – ?

Mayor of Yengisar County
- In office December 2008 – March 2012

Secretary of the Kashgar Municipal Commission for Discipline Inspection
- In office June 2006 – September 2008

Member of the Standing Committee of the Kashgar Municipal Party Committee
- In office January 2001 – September 2008

Personal details
- Born: May 1965 (age 61) Kashgar, Xinjiang, China
- Party: Chinese Communist Party (since 1995)
- Education: Kashgar Finance and Trade School; Tianjin University
- Occupation: Politician; department store manager

Zumret Obul (Uyghur: زۇمرەت ئوبۇل; Chinese: 祖木热提·吾布力; pinyin: Zǔmùrètí Wúbùlì; born May 1965) is a Chinese Uyghur politician who has served as chair of the Standing Committee of the Xinjiang Uyghur Autonomous Regional People's Congress since 2023 and as a member of the 13th National People's Congress. Prior to this, she worked in finance and in department stores, serving as manager of Minmao Department Store (1992–2001), before serving as mayor of Yengisar County (2008–2012) and Hami (2017–?) and in several local Chinese Communist Party (CCP) positions within her native Kashgar.

== Biography ==
Zumret Obul, an ethnic Uyghur from Kashgar, was born in May 1965 and educated at Kashgar Finance and Trade School, and later at the Tianjin University School of Management (1998–1999). After a brief stint at the Shufu County Pharmaceutical Company's pricing department, she started a long career in department stores, including as manager of Minmao Department Store (1992–2001) and deputy manager of Kashgar Prefectural Department Store (1995–2001).

In 1995, she joined the Chinese Communist Party. In January 2001, she became part of the Standing Committee of the Kashgar Municipal Party Committee, and in June 2006, she became secretary of the city's Commission for Discipline Inspection, serving in both positions until September 2008. In September 2008, she served as acting mayor of Yengisar County, being promoted to mayor in December 2008. In March 2012, she stepped down as mayor and joined the Kashgar Prefectural Administrative Office, serving as its deputy commissioner from her first month with them until May 2016 and then serving as secretary of their party leadership group until February 2017. In May 2016, she became deputy secretary of the Hami Municipal Party Committee and in February 2017, mayor of Hami. In 2014, she spent a few months at an ethnic cadres training class in the Central Party School of the Chinese Communist Party. In 2018, she was elected as a Xinjiang deputy to the 13th National People's Congress.

In February 2021, she was promoted to vice-chairman of the Standing Committee of the Xinjiang Uygur Autonomous Regional People's Congress. In October 2021, she was elected as a member of the Standing Committee of the Xinjiang Uygur Autonomous Regional Committee of the Chinese Communist Party. In November 2021, he was appointed Minister of the regional committee's United Front Work Department, and resigned from the post of Vice Chairman of the Standing Committee of the Xinjiang Uyghur Autonomous Region People's Congress.

On 18 January 2023, she was elected chair of the Standing Committee of the Xinjiang Uyghur Autonomous Regional People's Congress. In December 2023, she led a Chinese government delegation visiting Senegal and South Africa ostensibly for "telling the story of Xinjiang well"; United States-based dissident Hu Ping said that the visit was likely a part of the government's campaign to sway regional attention from its own human rights abuses against Uyghurs.
