= Arken Imirbaki =

Chinese politician (born 1953)

- ئاركەن ئىمىرباكى
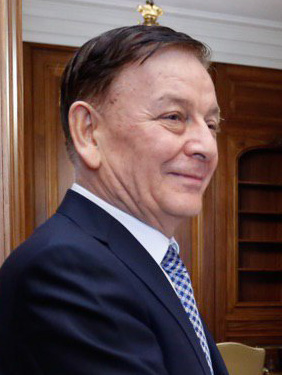

Vice Chairman of the Standing Committee of the National People's Congress
- In office 14 March 2013 – 10 March 2023
- Chairman: Zhang Dejiang; Li Zhanshu

Chairperson of the Xinjiang Uygur Autonomous Regional People's Congress
- In office 2008 – January 2014
- Preceded by: Abdurehim Amet
- Succeeded by: Shohrat Zakir

Personal details
- Born: September 1953 (age 72) Yengisar County, Kashgar Prefecture, Xinjiang
- Party: Chinese Communist Party
- Education: Northwest Institute of Light Industry

Arken Imirbaki (Uyghur: ئاركەن ئىمىرباكى, Chinese: 艾力更·依明巴海; pinyin: Àilìgēng Yīmíngbāhǎi; born September 1953) is a Chinese politician of Uyghur ethnicity.

== Biography ==
Arken was born in September 1953 in Yengisar County, Kashgar Prefecture, Xinjiang. In 1977, he graduated from the Northwest Institute of Light Industry. He joined the Chinese Communist Party in June 1980. In 1984, he started his political career as the deputy-director of bureau of industry of Ürümqi. Later, he served as the deputy-director of the Economic Commission of Ürümqi (1986–1992), Assistant to Mayor of Ürümqi (1992–1994), Deputy Director-General of the Economic and Trade Committee of Xinjiang (1994–1997), Director General and Deputy Secretary of Electronics Industry Department of Xinjiang (1997–1999), Secretary-General of Xinjiang Autonomous Region People's Government (1999–2001), Vice-chairman of Xinjiang Autonomous Region People's Government (2001–2008), and deputy-director of the Standing Committee of the Xinjiang People's Congress (2008–2013).

In 2008, Arken was elected as a delegate to 11th National People's Congress. Since 2013, he has served as a Vice Chairman of the 12th and 13th National People's Congress. He is also a member of the 19th Central Committee of the Chinese Communist Party.

On 7 December 2020, pursuant to Executive Order 13936, the United States Department of the Treasury imposed sanctions on all 14 Vice Chairperson of the National People's Congress, including Arken, for "undermining Hong Kong's autonomy and restricting the freedom of expression or assembly."
