= Hamudun Niyaz =

Chinese politician

- ھامۇدۇن نىياز

Chairman of the Standing Committee of the People's Congress of Xinjiang Uygur Autonomous Region
- In office 1985–2003
- Preceded by: Tömür Dawamat
- Succeeded by: Ablet Abdureshit

Mayor of Ürümqi
- In office July 1973 – February 1978
- Preceded by: Amingyou
- Succeeded by: Ubrihari Ismail
- In office January 1966 – January 1967
- Preceded by: Yasheng Hudabaidi
- Succeeded by: Sun Shaorong

Personal details
- Born: November 1932 (age 93) Luntai County, Xinjiang, Republic of China
- Party: Chinese Communist Party
- Education: Cadre School of Xinjiang Branch of the CPC Central Committee

Hamudun Niyaz (Uyghur: ھامۇدۇن نىياز, romanized: Hamudun Niyaz; Chinese: 阿木冬·尼牙孜; pinyin: Āmùdōng Níyàzī; born November 1932) is a Chinese politician of Uyghur origin who served as chairman of the Standing Committee of the People's Congress of Xinjiang Uygur Autonomous Region between 1985 and 2003. Prior to that, he served two separate terms as mayor of Ürümqi, from 1966 to 1967 and from 1973 to 1978.

He was a delegate to the 4th, 5th, 6th, 7th and 8th National People's Congress. He was a representative of the 13th National Congress of the Chinese Communist Party. He is a member of the 11th and 12th Central Commission for Discipline Inspection.

== Biography ==
Hamudun Niyaz was born in Luntai County, Xinjiang, during the Republic of China. He was a teacher before becoming involved in politics. He worked in his home-county Luntai for a long time. In 1962, he was assigned to Ürümqi and appointed deputy director of the Department of Commerce of Xinjiang Uygur Autonomous Region and deputy director of Supply and Marketing Cooperatives of Xinjiang Uygur Autonomous Region. He served as mayor of Ürümqi on two separate occasions, from 1966 to 1967 and from 1973 to 1978. In November 1977, he was admitted to member of the standing committee of the CPC Xinjiang Regional Committee, the region's top authority. In 1978, he was promoted to vice chairman of the Standing Committee of the People's Congress of Xinjiang Uygur Autonomous Region. On 1 July 1979, he became vice chairperson of the National People's Congress Ethnic Affairs Committee, serving in the post until June 1983. In April 1983, he was appointed secretary of Xinjiang Regional Political and Legal Affairs Commission, but having held the position for only two years. In 1985, he became chairman of the Standing Committee of the People's Congress of Xinjiang Uygur Autonomous Region, concurrently serving as deputy party secretary of Xinjiang Uygur Autonomous Region.

Government offices
Preceded by Yasin Hudaberdi	Mayor of Ürümqi; 1966–1967	Succeeded by Sun Shaorong
Preceded by Amingyou	Mayor of Ürümqi; 1973–1978	Succeeded by Ubulheyri Ismail
Assembly seats
Preceded by Tömür Dawamat	Chairman of the Standing Committee of the People's Congress of Xinjiang Uygur Autonomous Region; 1985–2003	Succeeded by Ablet Abdureshit
