= Nur Bekri =

Chinese politician (born 1961)

- نۇر بەكرى 努尔·白克力
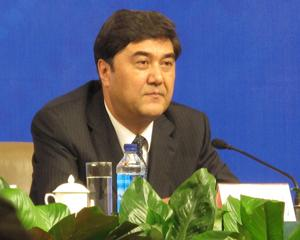
- Nur in 2010

Director of the National Energy Administration
- In office 9 January 2015 – 2 October 2018
- Premier: Li Keqiang
- Preceded by: Wu Xinxiong
- Succeeded by: Zhang Jianhua

Chairman of Xinjiang
- In office 22 January 2008 – 31 December 2014
- Party Secretary: Wang Lequan; Zhang Chunxian
- Preceded by: Ismail Tiliwaldi
- Succeeded by: Shohrat Zakir

Personal details
- Born: 9 August 1961 (age 65) Bole (Bortala), Xinjiang, China
- Party: Chinese Communist Party (expelled; 1982–2019)
- Education: Xinjiang University; Central Party School of the Chinese Communist Party

Chinese name
- Simplified Chinese: 努尔·白克力
- Traditional Chinese: 努爾·白克力
- Hanyu Pinyin: Nǔ'ěr Báikèlì
Transcriptions
Standard Mandarin
- Hanyu Pinyin: Nǔ'ěr Báikèlì

Uyghur name
- Uyghur: نۇر بەكرى
Transcriptions
- Siril Yëziqi: Нур бəкри

Nur Bekri (Uyghur: نۇر بەكرى; Chinese: 努尔·白克力; born 9 August 1961) is a Chinese former politician of Uyghur ethnicity, best known for his term as Chairman of the Xinjiang Uyghur Autonomous Region between 2008 and 2014. Between 2014 and 2018, he was vice-chairman of the National Development and Reform Commission and Director of the National Energy Administration, with rank equivalent of a minister. Bekri was one of the highest ranked ethnic minority officials in the Chinese government.

Bekri was born and raised in Xinjiang. Prior to his transfer to Beijing, he spent his entire life in the region, aside from a short stint as the Deputy Mayor of Feicheng, Shandong Province. He is also former Mayor of Ürümqi, the capital of Xinjiang. In 2019, he was dismissed from his posts, expelled from the Communist Party and sentenced to life in prison for corruption.

== Early life ==
Nur Bekri was born in a village near Kazakhstan in an area under the jurisdiction of Bole (known in Uyghur as "Bortala"), Xinjiang. He received education in the Chinese language since early childhood and spoke Uyghur and Mandarin Chinese at a native fluency. He spent only one year in high school before taking the university entrance examinations, and scored highest in his township. He was sought after as a "minority talent" by the nation's top universities.

Ultimately, Bekri enrolled at Xinjiang University in September 1978 and studied political theory. He joined the Chinese Communist Party (CCP) in December 1982. He stayed at his alma mater to serve as a lecturer for political theory after graduation, and was a prominent member of the local Communist Youth League organization, rising to become the Xinjiang University Youth League organization's deputy chief in the late 1980s, eventually being promoted to the First Secretary (i.e. leader) of the Xinjiang University Youth League, a position he held until 1992.

== Political career ==
Between 1993 and 1995 Bekri served in the Kashgar region as an assistant to the local governor. Between 1994 and 2002 Bekri served in a series of local political roles, including the vice-mayor of Feicheng, Shandong province, the deputy Secretary-General of the Xinjiang regional government, the deputy party secretary and mayor of Ürümqi. At age 37, Bekri was the youngest mayor of a provincial-level capital in China at the time. Bekri then worked in the Xinjiang regional government beginning in 2000, becoming a member of the Party Committee, then Deputy Party Secretary in January 2005.

=== Chairman of Xinjiang ===
Nur Bekri was appointed Chairman of Xinjiang, replacing Ismail Tiliwaldi, who resigned as chairman in December 2007. At age 46, Bekri became one of the youngest provincial governors (or equivalents) in China. As chairman, Bekri was nominally Xinjiang's top government official, but in practice was subordinate to the Communist Party Secretary for the region, Wang Lequan (term 1994–2010), then Zhang Chunxian (2010 onwards).

After the 2009 Ürümqi riots, Bekri delivered the televised address in which he explained the situation that has led up to the violence and then condemned who he deemed to be coordinators of the attack. Bekri has been subject to criticism by Uyghur economist and scholar Ilham Tohti, founder of Uyghur Online, a website that criticized the chairman and his policies. Tohti said that Bekri was "unqualified" for his position and that he "does not care about Uyghurs". Tohti was later jailed on charges of "separatism". The World Uyghur Congress and some in the overseas Uyghur community also considered Bekri to be a "puppet of the Chinese government." Bekri was the highest-ranked government official to deliver a televised speech on this issue.

As the highest ranked ethnic Uyghur official in the Xinjiang government, Bekri toed the party line on issues related to Xinjiang independence, often issuing official denunciations of what the government saw as religious extremism or terrorism. He was sometimes called "Nol Bekri", a Uyghur language pun on his name which roughly meant "nil Bekri" or "zero Bekri", referring to his being seen as having little to no power.

=== National Energy Administration ===
Bekri was transferred to the National Energy Administration (NEA) under the powerful National Development and Reform Commission, a body with wide jurisdiction over economic development, in December 2014. He was replaced as Xinjiang Chairman by Shohrat Zakir. By taking on the top job at the National Energy Administration, Nur Bekri broke the mold of Uyghur government leaders, taking on a substantive post completely unrelated to ethnic affairs. His first act as leader of the NEA was to crack down on corruption; one of his predecessors Liu Tienan went to jail for corruption in a high-profile case. Under Bekri's leadership, the NEA pledged massive investment into renewable energy, and closed down over 100 coal-fired power plants. He became an outspoken proponent of renewable energy, meeting global industry executives and touting that China was contributing "strength and wisdom" to the transformation of the global energy production.

Bekri was an alternate of the 17th Central Committee of the Chinese Communist Party and a member of the 18th Central Committee. He was the only ethnic Uyghur with full membership on the 18th Central Committee. He did not gain a seat on the 19th Central Committee despite not having reached retirement age, raising speculation in 2017 that he had fallen out of favor.

== Investigation ==
In the early morning hours of 20 September 2018, Bekri was placed under investigation by the Central Commission for Discipline Inspection and the National Supervisory Commission. His last public appearance was a visit to Russia with Vice-Premier Han Zheng. On 2 October 2018, he was removed as the deputy director of the NDRC and director of the National Energy Administration. On 16 March 2019, he was expelled from the Chinese Communist Party. French news agency AFP reported that Bekri had been arrested for graft, citing a statement on 2 April 2019 by national prosecutors; the report did not give a date for the former official's trial.

On 25 July, he stood trial for taking bribes at the Shenyang Intermediate People's Court. The public prosecutors accused him of taking bribes directly or via others money and property worth more than 79.1 million yuan ($11.5 million) serving in his various positions between 1998 and 2018 in return for assisting certain organizations and individuals with their business operations, project contracting and job promotion or transfer and trading power for sex. On 2 December, Nur Bekri was sentenced to life in prison by Shenyang Intermediate People's Court for bribery worth more than 79.1 million yuan ($11.5 million) during his term as head of the energy administration, deputy chief of the Ürümqi committee of the Chinese Communist Party in Xinjiang, mayor of Ürümqi and chairman of the region. All of his private property was ordered confiscated, and the money and related interests that he had received in the form of bribes will be turned over to the national treasury. He pleaded guilty in court and expressed remorse. He said he would not appeal to a higher court.

Government offices
Preceded by Ismail Tiliwaldi	Chairman of Xinjiang	Succeeded by Shohrat Zakir
Preceded by Wu Xinxiong	Director of the National Energy Administration; 2014–2018	Succeeded by Zhang Jianhua
