= Ismail Tiliwaldi =

Chinese politician (born 1944)

- ئىسمائىل تىلىۋالدى 司马义·铁力瓦尔地

Vice Chairman of the Standing Committee of the National People's Congress
- In office 15 March 2008 – 14 March 2013
- Chairman: Wu Bangguo

Chairman of Xinjiang
- In office January 2003 – December 2007
- Preceded by: Abdul'ahat Abdulrixit
- Succeeded by: Nur Bekri

Personal details
- Born: November 1944 (age 81) Shufu County (Konasheher), Xinjiang, China
- Party: Chinese Communist Party
- Education: Xinjiang University

Chinese name
- Traditional Chinese: 司馬義·鐵力瓦爾迪
- Simplified Chinese: 司马义·铁力瓦尔地
Transcriptions
Standard Mandarin
- Hanyu Pinyin: Sīmǎyì Tiělìwǎěrdì

Uyghur name
- Uyghur: ئىسمائىل تىلىۋالدى
Transcriptions
- Siril Yëziqi: Исма'ил Тиливалди

Ismail Tiliwaldi (Uyghur: ئىسمائىل تىلىۋالدى, Исма'ил Тиливалди; born November 1944) is a retired Chinese politician of Uyghur heritage. He was the Chairman of Xinjiang from 2003 to 2007, and Vice Chairman of the Standing Committee of the National People's Congress from 2008 to 2013.

== Biography ==
A Uyghur, Tiliwaldi began working in 1967 and joined the Chinese Communist Party in May 1973. In 1967, Tiliwaldi graduated from Xinjiang University with a degree in mathematics.

During the Cultural Revolution, Tiliwaldi was sent to the countryside for "re-education". He then served as an interpreter at a local commune's tractor factory. In 1973, he found work in the Organization Department of Shufu County. He studied at the Central Party School of the Chinese Communist Party in the early 1980s, ostensibly to prepare himself for higher office.

He served deputy chief and chief of the Organization Department for the Kashgar Prefecture, deputy Commissioner (equivalent to mayor) of Kashgar, deputy Party Secretary of Kashgar, Commissioner of Kashgar.

Beginning in 1993, Tiliwaldi served as the secretary-general for the Xinjiang Autonomous Regional Government, deputy Political Commissar of the Xinjiang Production and Construction Corps of the Army. In 1998, Tiliwaldi entered the Regional Party Standing Committee of Xinjiang and become and deputy secretary of the Xinjiang regional Political and Legal Affairs Commission.

In January 2003, he was elected as chairman of the Xinjiang region at the first session of the tenth Xinjiang People's Congress.

He was an alternate member of the 16th Central Committee of the Chinese Communist Party and a full member of the 17th Central Committee.

Government offices
| Preceded by Abdul'ahat Abdulrixit | Chairman of Xinjiang; 2003–2007 | Succeeded by Nur Bekri |
