= Ismail Amat =

Chinese politician of Uyghur ethnicity (1935–2018)

- ئىسمائىل ئەھمەد 司马义·艾买提

Vice Chairman of the Standing Committee of the National People's Congress
- In office 15 March 2003 – 15 March 2008
- Chairman: Wu Bangguo

State Councilor of China
- In office 1993–2003
- Premier: Li Peng→Zhu Rongji

Vice Chairman of the Chinese People's Political Consultative Conference
- In office 10 April 1988 – 27 March 1993
- Chairman: Li Xiannian

Director of the National Ethnic Affairs Commission
- In office 20 January 1986 – 18 March 1998
- Preceded by: Yang Jingren
- Succeeded by: Li Dezhu

Chairman of Xinjiang
- In office 1979–1985
- Preceded by: Wang Feng
- Succeeded by: Tömür Dawamat

Personal details
- Born: September 1935 Qira County, Xinjiang
- Died: 16 October 2018 (aged 83) Beijing
- Party: Chinese Communist Party
- Education: Central Party School of the Chinese Communist Party

Ismail Amat (Uyghur: ئىسمائىل ئەھمەد, romanized: Isma'il Ehmet; Chinese: 司马义·艾买提; pinyin: Sīmǎyì Àimǎití; September 1935 – 16 October 2018) was a Chinese politician of Uyghur ethnicity who served as Chairman of Xinjiang, State Councillor, Vice Chairman of the Standing Committee of the National People's Congress and Vice Chairman of the Chinese People's Political Consultative Conference (CPPCC).

He was among the highest-ranking Uyghur politicians sitting for decades in the Central Government of People's Republic of China between 1979 and 2008.

== Early life and career in Xinjiang ==
Ismail was born 1935 in Qira County, Hotan Prefecture, Xinjiang Province, Republic of China. His parents were poor Uyghur peasants. From 1952 to 1954, he took part in the land reform movement in his hometown and joined the Chinese Communist Party (CCP) in 1953. He rose quickly in the government of Qira and became the county magistrate in 1954 at the age of 19.

In 1960, he was selected to study in Beijing at the Central Party School of the CCP for two years. After returning to Xinjiang, he became deputy publicity head of Hotan Prefecture in 1963.

During the Cultural Revolution, Ismail was elevated to the regional government of Xinjiang in 1969 and elected to the 10th Central Committee of the CCP in 1972. From 1971 to 1979 he served as Xinjiang's party secretary (then subordinate to the first secretary) and director of its Organization Department.

In 1979, he became Chairman (Governor) of Xinjiang Uyghur Autonomous Region at the age of 44. During his six-year tenure, he oversaw Xinjiang's transition to a market economy in Deng Xiaoping's reform and opening era.

== Career in the national government ==
In 1986, Ismail was elevated to the national government and became Director of the National Ethnic Affairs Commission, a key position in charge of affairs concerning ethnic minorities, especially the Tibetans and Muslim groups such as the Uyghurs. As a prominent Muslim CCP leader, he served as a mouthpiece of China's ethnic policies and condemned separatist movements. He served in the position until 1998, and concurrently as vice-chairman of the Chinese People's Political Consultative Conference (CPPCC) from 1988 to 1993. From 1993 to 2003 he also served as a vice-premier-level State Councillor. During his tenure there were multiple anti-Chinese protests in Xinjiang which were suppressed by the government. Amat supported the official policy of harshly treating ethnic separatists while promoting economic growth and stability in minority regions.

From 2003 to 2008 Ismail served as vice-chairman of the 10th National People's Congress. As one of the highest-ranking Uyghur or Muslim politicians in the history of the People's Republic of China, he frequently visited Central Asian nations and met with visiting dignitaries from Islamic countries.

After the September 11 attacks in 2001, the United States captured a number of Chinese Uyghurs in the War in Afghanistan and held them in the Guantanamo Bay detention camp. China considered the Uyghur detainees terrorists and demanded that the US hand them over to Chinese custody. When the demand was refused, Ismail condemned the US in 2006.

Ismail served as a member of seven consecutive CCP Central Committees, from the 10th to the 16th, spanning 45 years.

== Death ==
Ismail Amat died on 16 October 2018 in Beijing, at the age of 83. He was buried at the Babaoshan Revolutionary Cemetery. CCP general secretary Xi Jinping, Vice President Wang Qishan, former CCP general secretary Hu Jintao, other CCP Politburo Standing Committee members Li Zhanshu, Wang Yang, Wang Huning, Zhao Leji, Han Zheng and other top leaders attended his funeral.
