= Ilham Sabir =

Chinese politician (born 1961)

- ئىلھام سابىر

Vice Chairman of the Xinjiang Regional Committee of the Chinese People's Political Consultative Conference
- Incumbent
- Assumed office 25 January 2018
- Chairman: Nurlan Abilmazhinuly

Mayor of Ürümqi
- In office January 2014 – January 2018
- Party Secretary: Zhu Hailun; Li Xuejun; Xu Hairong
- Preceded by: Jërullah Hesamidin
- Succeeded by: Yasin Sadiq

Personal details
- Born: February 1961 (age 65) Tacheng Prefecture, Xinjiang, China
- Party: Chinese Communist Party
- Education: Xinjiang Agricultural University; Dalian University of Technology; Central Party School of the Chinese Communist Party

Chinese name
- Simplified Chinese: 伊力哈木·沙比尔
- Traditional Chinese: 伊力哈木·沙比爾
Transcriptions
Standard Mandarin
- Hanyu Pinyin: Yīlìhāmù Shābǐ'ěr

Ilham Sabir (Uyghur: ئىلھام سابىر, romanized: Ilham Sabir; born February 1961) is a Chinese politician of Uyghur origin who has been vice chairman of the Xinjiang Regional Committee of the Chinese People's Political Consultative Conference since 25 January 2018. He previously served as mayor of Ürümqi, the capital of Xinjiang, from 2014 to 2018.

== Biography ==
Ilham Sabir was born in Tacheng Prefecture, Xinjiang, in February 1961. After resuming the college entrance examination, in 1978, he enrolled in Xinjiang Eight-One Agriculture College (now Xinjiang Agricultural University), majoring in agricultural mechanization, where he graduated in 1983. He also studied at Dalian University of Technology and Central Party School of the Chinese Communist Party as a part-time student.

From 1983 to 1992, he worked at Xinjiang Academy of Agricultural Sciences. He was eventually promoted to its deputy director of Development Center and deputy general manager of Science and Technology Development Corporation.

Ilham Sabir joined the Chinese Communist Party in November 1990, and got involved in politics in October 1992, when he was appointed deputy director of Business Division of Department of Agriculture and Industry of CPC Xinjiang Regional Committee. In September 1995, he became deputy director of Agricultural Machinery Bureau of Xinjiang Uyghur Autonomous Region, rising to director in April 2000. He was deputy party secretary of Bortala Mongol Autonomous Prefecture in August 2005, and held that office until December 2008, when he was made deputy director and party branch secretary of the Water Resources Department of Xinjiang Uyghur Autonomous Region. In March 2013, he was named acting mayor of Ürümqi, a major city and the capital of Xinjiang. He was installed as mayor in January 2014. On 25 January 2018, he took office as vice chairman of the Xinjiang Regional Committee of the Chinese People's Political Consultative Conference, Xinjiang's top political advisory body.

Government offices
Preceded by Jërullah Hesamidin	Mayor of Ürümqi; 2014–2018	Succeeded by Yasin Sadiq
