= Zhang Jianhua =

- 章建华
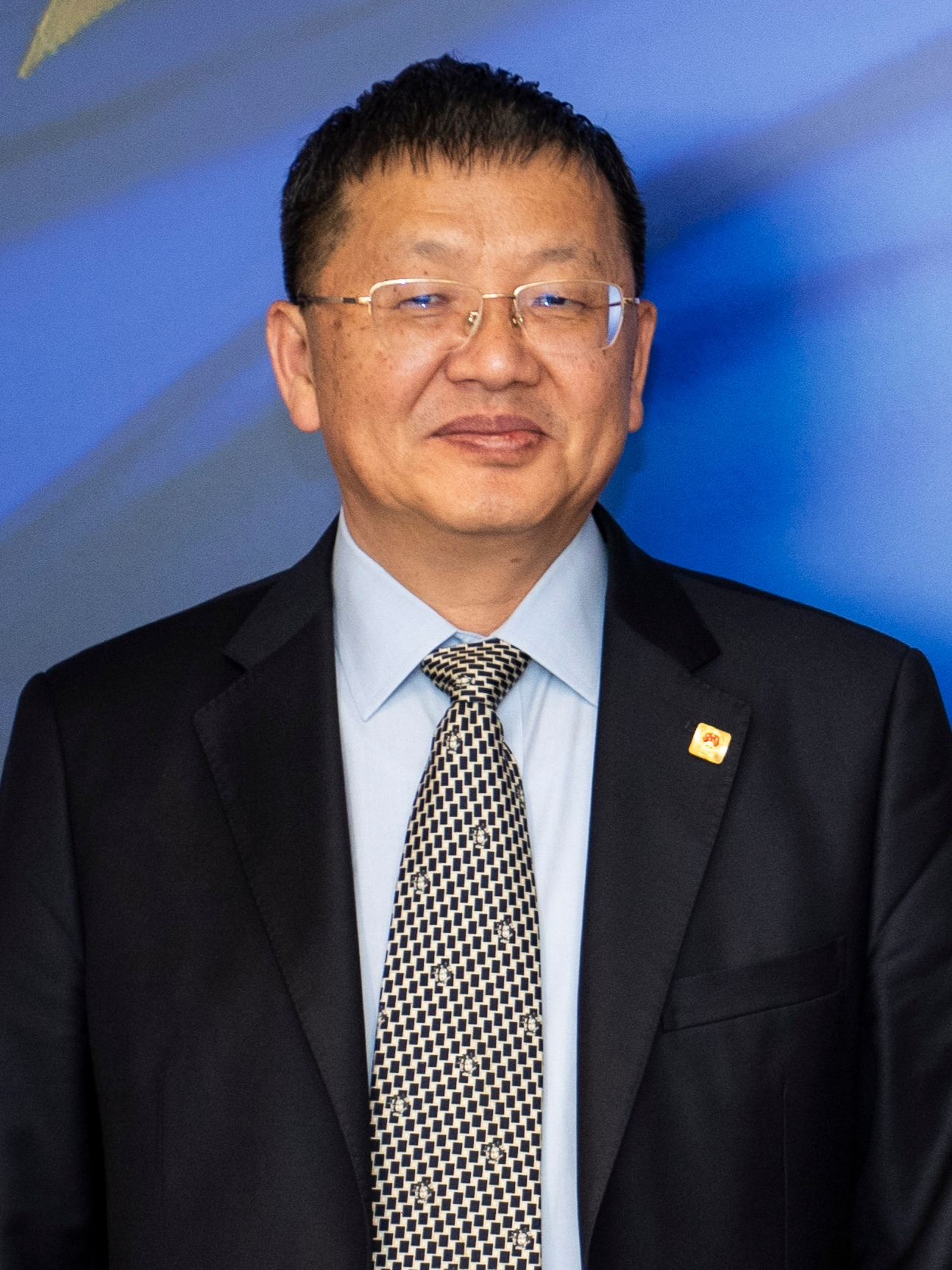
- Zhang in 2024

Director of the National Energy Administration
- In office 5 December 2018 – 13 December 2024
- Premier: Li Keqiang; Li Qiang
- Preceded by: Nur Bekri
- Succeeded by: Wang Hongzhi

Personal details
- Born: September 1964 (age 62) Shanghai, China
- Party: Chinese Communist Party
- Education: East China University of Science and Technology

Chinese name
- Traditional Chinese: 章建華
- Simplified Chinese: 章建华
Transcriptions
Standard Mandarin
- Hanyu Pinyin: Zhāng Jiànhuá

Zhang Jianhua (Chinese: 章建华; born September 1964) is a Chinese politician who served as the director of the National Energy Administration from 2018 to 2024. He has over 30 years of working experience in China's petroleum and petrochemical industry. He is a delegate to the 19th National Congress of the Chinese Communist Party and a member of the 19th Central Discipline Commission of the Chinese Communist Party.

== Early life ==
Zhang was born in Shanghai in September 1964.

== Career ==
Zhang entered the workforce in July 1986, and joined the Chinese Communist Party in August 1994.

=== Petroleum and petrochemical Industry ===
He joined the Shanghai Gaoqiao Petrochemical Company in 1986, becoming chief economic manager in May 1995 and assistant manager in April 1999. He worked at the SINOPEC Shanghai Gaoqiao Branch between February 2000 and April 2003, what he was promoted to assistant manager in February 2000 and to manager in September 2000. In April 2003 he was promoted to become vice-president of the Sinopec. In February 2005 he was promoted again to become a party member of the China Petrochemical Corporation. In October 2016 he was appointed vice-president of the China National Petroleum Corporation and two years later was elevated to the CEO position.

=== Politics ===
On December 5, 2018, he was appointed director of the National Energy Administration, replacing Nur Bekri. He was succeeded by Wang Hongzhi on 13 December 2024.

In 2025 he was expelled from the CCP for corruption.

Government offices
Preceded by Nur Bekri	Director of the National Energy Administration; 2018–2024	Succeeded by Wang Hongzhi
