= Chuanyi Wang =

Environmental chemistry scientist

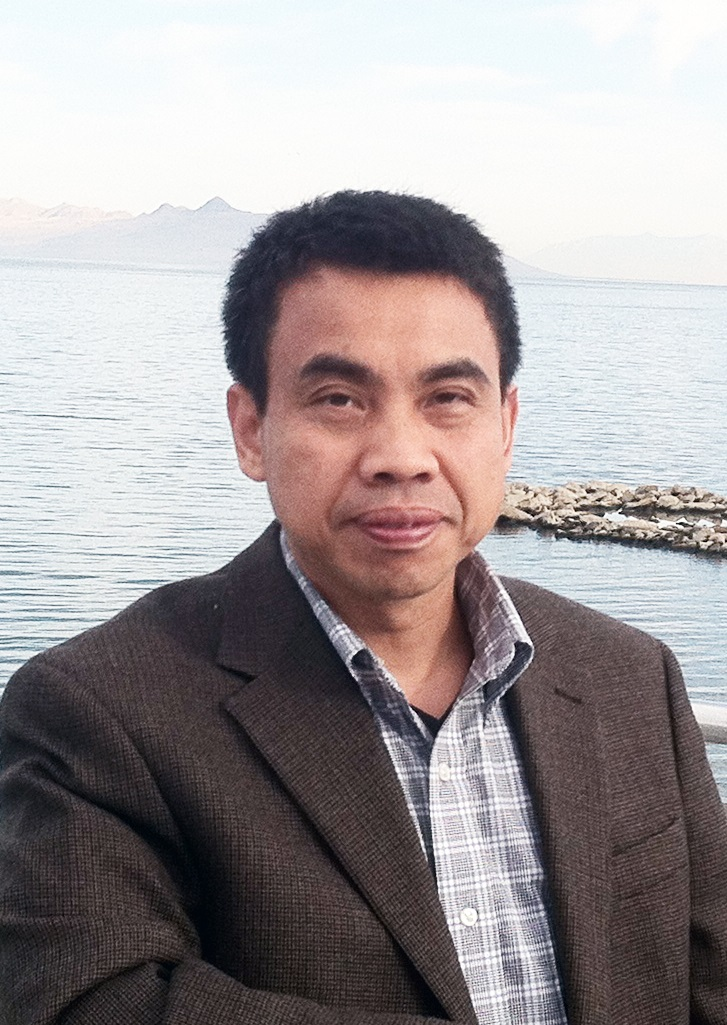
- Born: July 25, 1966 (age 60); Jiangsu, China
- Occupations: Environmental chemistry scientist, academic
- Awards: IAAM Scientist Award, Tianshan Award of China, Science and Technology Award, China's Overseas Chinese Community Contribution Award (Innovative Talents)

Academic background
- Education: Undergraduate diplomas in Chemistry (1986, 1991), PhD in Physical Chemistry
- Alma mater: Institute of Photographic Chemistry (now Technical Institute of Physics and Chemistry), Chinese Academy of Sciences
- Thesis: Surface/Interfacial Microscopic Events at TiO_{2} and its Metal Composites (1998)

Chuanyi Wang is a Chinese American environmental chemistry scientist, academic, and author. He is a Distinguished Professor and Academic Dean at the School of Environmental Science and Engineering at the Shaanxi University of Science & Technology. He is recognized for his research in environmental photocatalysis, environmental materials, surface/interface chemistry, nanomaterials, and pollution controlling.

Wang is the author and editor of two books, Recent Research Developments in Physical Chemistry: Surfaces And Interfaces of Nanostructured Systems and Encyclopedia of Surface and Colloid Science.

Wang is a Fellow of Royal Society of Chemistry, and International Association of Advanced Materials (IAAM).

== Education ==
Born in China on July 25, 1966, Wang graduated with Undergraduate Diplomas in Chemistry from Yancheng Teachers University in 1986 and Soochow University in 1991. He completed his PhD in 1998 from Technical Institute of Physics and Chemistry, Chinese Academy of Sciences.

== Career ==
After completing his PhD in 1998, Wang held the Alexander von Humboldt Research Fellowship at the Free University Berlin and Institute for Solar Energy Research in Germany from 1999 to 2000. Between 2001 and 2006, he held the appointment of Research Associate and post-doctoral Research Associate at Tufts University. Following this appointment, he occupied the position of Research Assistant Professor at University of Missouri-Kansas City for two years. Starting from 2008 till 2009, he joined the University of Missouri-Kansas City as an Adjunct PhD Faculty. From 2010 to 2017, he served as a Distinguished Professor of Chinese Academy of Sciences (CAS). Currently, he holds the appointment of Honorary Professor at Wuhan University since 2014 and a Visiting Scientist at Tufts from 2019. He holds an appointment as a Distinguished Professor in the department of Environmental Science and Engineering at Shaanxi University of Science & Technology.

As of 2021, Wang is serving as an Academic Dean at School of Environmental Science and Engineering in Shaanxi University of Science & Technology. He served as a Director of Laboratory of Environmental Sciences and Technology, XJIPC and vice-director of Key Laboratory of Functional Materials & Devices for Special Environments of CAS.

== Research ==
Wang has authored more than 270 publications. Wang's research work spans on environmental remediation, eco-materials, and surface/interface chemistry, and catalysis focused on nanosized metals and semiconductors.

=== Photocatalysis ===
Wang's research on photocatalysis is significant in reducing contaminants. He studied the selective photocatalytic N_{2} fixation induced by the nitrogen vacancies and indicated that Photocatalytic N_{2} fixation supported by nitrogen vacancies (NVs) leads to improved graphitic carbon nitride (g-C_{3}N_{4}).

Wang's research work focuses on the performance of nanostructured TiO_{2} particles. He conducted a comparative study that aimed to characterize the performance of TiO_{2} particles created in three different ways. The results from the study concluded that TiO_{2} nanoparticles prepared from organic precursors demonstrated an increased photocatalytic activity. Based on this method, Wang developed a method to uniformly distribute doped species like metal ions in semiconductor photocatalyst matrix.

Wang presented an in-depth view into the effectiveness of photocatalytic production under carbon vacancies. The findings suggested that Photocatalytic H_{2}O_{2} production at Graphitic carbon nitrides (g-C_{3}N_{4}) carries the possibility to increase by 14 times with the carbon vacancies. He also studied the role of oxygen vacancies in the photocatalytic removal of NO under visible light. The study demonstrated that oxygen vacancies carry the potential to support selective photoreduction of NO to N_{2} and hinder the production of more toxic nitrogen dioxide.

=== Pollution Controlling ===
Wang's research characterized the importance of heavy metal adsorption by clay minerals. In a study conducted in 2019, he highlighted the primary adsorption mechanisms of the clay minerals like halloysite, bentonite, and attapulgite. This study reveals how wastewater contamination can be tackled with the utilization of clay mineral adsorbents.

Wang also focused his research on the removal of microplastics from the environment. In a recent study, he reviewed the removal methods, mechanisms, advantages of the efficient methods as well as the disadvantages of many microplastics removal methods.

=== Nanoparticles ===
Wang has extensively carried out research on nanoparticles and its implications for the environment. He formulated and characterized chitosan–poly(vinyl alcohol)/bentonite nanocomposites. The study of adsorption of Hg(II) ions by nanocomposites revealed that they carry high adsorption capacity for mercury ions, and can promote the adsorption selectivity of the nanocomposites.

Wang reviewed the interaction between silver nanoparticles and other nanoparticles. Discarded into the aquatic environment via waste or intentional release, the silver nanoparticles can lead to adverse effects on the aquatic life. With his study, it was revealed that Titanium oxide nanoparticles help in reducing the toxicity and dissolution of silver nanoparticles.

=== Surface/interface chemistry ===
Wang conducted a surface chemistry study on typical photocatalytic material TiO_{2} by means of second-order nonlinear laser spectroscopy, clarifying the distribution characteristics of hydroxyl groups on the surface of TiO_{2}, and the properties of probe molecules methanol and acetic acid, as well as their adsorption modes and competitive adsorption with water molecules.

== Awards and honors ==
- 1998 - Humboldt Research Fellowship, Alexander von Humboldt Foundation
- 1998 – Excellent Prize, President Scholarship of Chinese Academy of Sciences
- 2011 – Science and Technology Award, Chinese Materials Research Society
- 2014 – Tianshan Award of China, Government of Xinjiang Uygur Autonomous Region
- 2016 – China's Overseas Chinese Community Contribution Award (Innovative Talents), China Association for Science and Technology (CAST)
- 2018- Fellow of Royal Society of Chemistry (FRSC)
- 2020 – Named in the top 2% of the most influential scientists in the world in their scientific career, 2021 (Physical Chemistry, #169 in 2020). Stanford University
- 2020 – IAAM Scientist Award, International Association of Advanced Materials
- 2022 - Fellow of International Association of Advanced Materials
- 2022 - Named in the top 2% of the most influential scientists in the world in their scientific career, 2022 (Physical Chemistry, #87 in 2021). Stanford University

== Bibliography ==
=== Books/chapters ===
- Encyclopedia of Surface and Colloid Science, Third Edition (2002) ISBN 9781466590458
- Recent Research Developments in Physical Chemistry: Surfaces And Interfaces of Nanostructured Systems (2017) ISBN 9788178952840

=== Selected articles ===
- Wang, C. Y., Bahnemann, D. W., & Dohrmann, J. K. (2000). A novel preparation of iron-doped TiO_{2} nanoparticles with enhanced photocatalytic activity. Chemical Communications, (16), 1539–1540.
- Wang, C. Y., Böttcher, C., Bahnemann, D. W., & Dohrmann, J. K. (2003). A comparative study of nanometer sized Fe (III)-doped TiO_{2} photocatalysts: synthesis, characterization and activity. Journal of Materials Chemistry, 13(9), 2322–2329.
- Chen, S., Slattum, P., Wang, C., & Zang, L. (2015). Self-assembly of perylene imide molecules into 1D nanostructures: methods, morphologies, and applications. Chemical reviews, 115(21), 11967–11998.
- Dong, G., Ho, W., & Wang, C. (2015). Selective photocatalytic N_{2} fixation dependent on gC_{3}N_{4} induced by nitrogen vacancies. Journal of Materials Chemistry A, 3(46), 23435–23441.
- Li, S., Dong, G., Hailili, R., Yang, L., Li, Y., Wang, F., ... & Wang, C. (2016). Effective photocatalytic H_{2}O_{2} production under visible light irradiation at g-C_{3}N_{4} modulated by carbon vacancies. Applied Catalysis B: Environmental, 190, 26–35.
