= Tömür Dawamat =

Chinese politician (1927–2018)

- تۆمۈر داۋامەت 铁木尔·达瓦买提
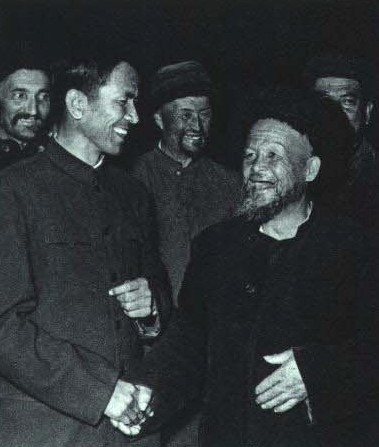
- Tömür Dawamat (left) in November 1964

Vice Chairman of the Standing Committee of the National People's Congress
- In office 27 March 1993 – 15 March 2003
- Chairman: Qiao Shi; Li Peng

Chairman of Xinjiang
- In office 1985–1993
- Preceded by: Ismail Amat
- Succeeded by: Ablet Abdureshit

Chairman of the Xinjiang Uygur Autonomous Regional People's Congress
- In office 1979–1985
- Preceded by: new position
- Succeeded by: Hamudun Niyaz

Vice Chairman of the Xinjiang Uyghur Autonomous Regional Revolutionary Committee
- In office March 1964 – September 1968
- Chairman: Saifuddin Azizi

Personal details
- Born: June 16, 1927 Toksun, Xinjiang, Republic of China
- Died: December 19, 2018 (aged 91) Beijing, China
- Resting place: Babaoshan Revolutionary Cemetery
- Party: Chinese Communist Party

Tömür Dawamat (Uyghur: تۆمۈر داۋامەت, romanized: Tömür Dawamet; Chinese: 铁木尔·达瓦买提; pinyin: Tiěmù'ěr Dáwǎmǎití; June 16, 1927 – December 19, 2018) was the chairman of the Xinjiang Uyghur Autonomous Region of the People's Republic of China from 1985 to 1993.

Tömür was an ethnic Uyghur. He started his working career in May 1950 and later became the local leader from 1954 to 1964. He held a high position in the Xinjiang Uyghur Autonomous Region Revolution Committee from 1968 to 1979 and then became Chief of the People's Congress of the Xinjiang Uyghur Autonomous Region before he took office as the chairman of Xinjiang in 1985. After his chairmanship, he was a member of the Standing Committee of the National People's Congress.

Tömür Dawamat died on December 19, 2018, at the age of 91.

Preceded by Ismail Amat	Chairman of Xinjiang; 1985–1993	Succeeded by Abdul'ahat Abdulrixit
