= Shufu County =

Shufu County: 疏附县 (Chinese); كونا شەھەر ناھىيىسى (Uyghur); Konasheher, Konaxahar
- County
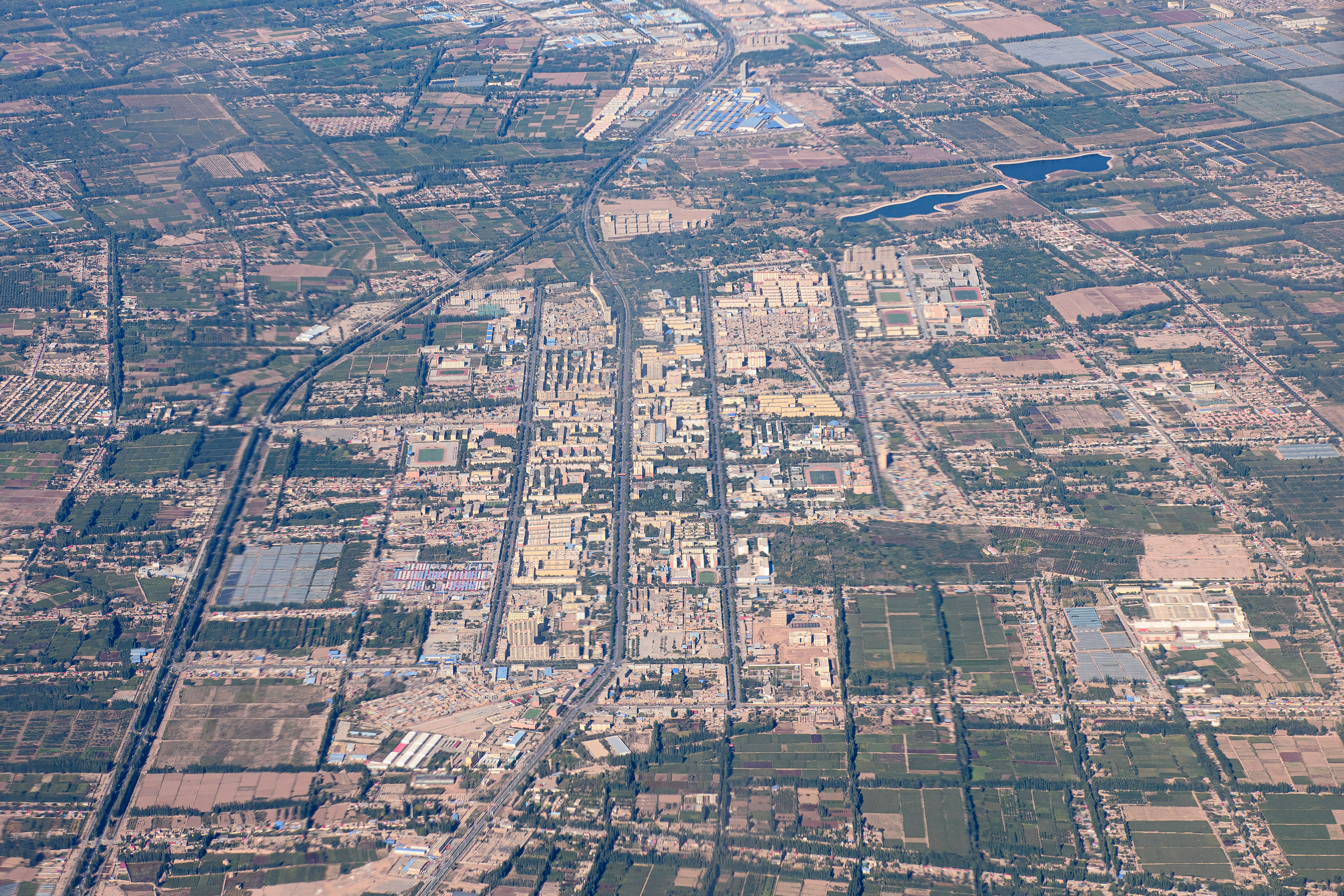
- Aerial view

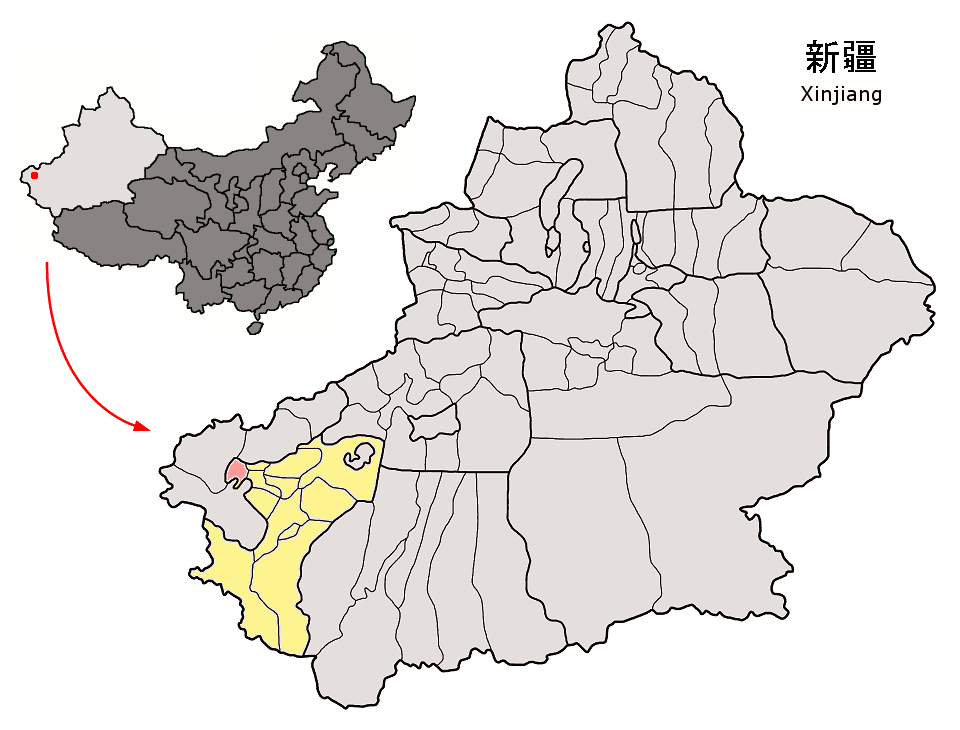
- Location of Shufu County (red) within Kashgar Prefecture (yellow) and Xinjiang

- Location of the seat in Xinjiang Shufu (Xinjiang) Shufu (China)
- Coordinates: 39°21′00″N 75°51′03″E
- Country: China
- Autonomous region: Xinjiang
- Prefecture: Kashgar
- County seat: Tokkuzak
- Township-level divisions: 4 towns; 6 townships; other areas

Area
  - Total: 2,709.47 km^{2} (1,046.13 sq mi)

Population (2020)
  - Total: 263,014
  - Density: 97.0721/km^{2} (251.416/sq mi)

Ethnic groups
  - Major ethnic groups: Uyghur
- Time zone: UTC+8 (China Standard (Note: Locals in Xinjiang frequently observe UTC+6 (Xinjiang Time), 2 hours behind Beijing.))
- Postal code: 844100
- Website: www.xjsf.gov.cn

Shufu County

Uyghur name
- Uyghur: قەشقەر كونا شەھەر ناھىيىسى
- Literal meaning: Kashgar Old Town County
Transcriptions
- Latin Yëziqi: Qeshqer Konasheher Nahiyisi
- Yengi Yeziⱪ: Ⱪəxⱪər Konaxəⱨər Naⱨiyisi
- SASM/GNC: Kaxkar Konaxahar Nahiyisi
- Siril Yëziqi: Қәшқәр Конашәһәр Наһийиси

Chinese name
- Simplified Chinese: 疏附县
- Traditional Chinese: 疏附縣
Transcriptions
Standard Mandarin
- Hanyu Pinyin: Shūfù Xiàn
- Wade–Giles: Shu¹-fu⁴ Hsien⁴

Alternative Chinese name
- Simplified Chinese: 阔纳协海尔县
- Traditional Chinese: 闊納協海爾縣
Transcriptions
Standard Mandarin
- Hanyu Pinyin: Kuònàxiéhǎi'ěr Xiàn

Second alternative Chinese name
- Simplified Chinese: 喀什噶尔阔纳协海尔县
- Traditional Chinese: 喀什噶爾闊納協海爾縣
Transcriptions
Standard Mandarin
- Hanyu Pinyin: Kāshígá'ěr Kuònàxiéhǎi'ěr Xiàn

Kazakh name
- Kazakh: قاشقار كونەءشار اۋدانى; Қашқар Көнешәр ауданы Qaşqar Köneşär audany

Kyrgyz name
- Kyrgyz: قاشقار كۅۅنۅ شاار وودانى; Кашкар көөнө шаар ооданы Qaşqar köönö şaar oodany

Shufu County, also known as Konasheher County (Uyghur Latin) or Konaxahar County (Uyghur SASM/GNC), is a county in Kashgar Prefecture, Xinjiang Uyghur Autonomous Region, China. It contains an area of 3,513 km^{2} (1,356 sq mi). According to the 2002 census, it has a population of 360,000.

== Name ==
The names of "Shufu County" and nearby "Shule County", transliterations of local language names from the Han dynasty corresponds to its Uyghur names, "Kona Xahar" (meaning 'old city') and "Yengi Xahar" (New City) respectively. The names for the two counties in both languages may share their origins in languages of the Saka people, residents of Kashgar area before its linguistic Turkification in as late as the 11th century.

== History ==
During the initial years of the Western Han Dynasty, pertaining to the Western Shule region of the nation. In 1762, the Qing government in Kazuo relocated to Kashgar Gaer City (present-day Kashgar City), situated two miles northwest of the newly established "Leining City". In 1826, Leining City was destroyed. In 1828, a new city was constructed, relocating the Shule government, military, and warehouses to this new city. A governor was appointed to oversee it, designating it as Shule County, commonly referred to as the new city or Han City. The original Shule County was renamed Shufu County, which is the adjacent city of Shule, typically called the old city or Back City.

In the fall of 1955, the county people's government relocated to the town of Tokezak, marking the establishment of the new county town.

In 2013, Awat Township (Awati; ئاۋات يېزىسى / 阿瓦提乡) and Yëngi'östeng Township (Yingwusitan; يېڭىئۆستەڭ يېزىسى / 英吾斯坦乡) were transferred to Kashgar city.

On December 15, 2013, 16 people were killed in an attack on a police station. A group, armed with knives and bombs, attacked the police station and killed two police officers. In the aftermath 14 of the 16 attackers were killed by police special units.

On April 28, 2014, General Secretary of the Chinese Communist Party Xi Jinping visited Tokkuzak (Tuokezhake) during his inspection tour of Xinjiang.

In 2014, the authorities of the Xinjiang Autonomous Region dissolved Upar Township and subsequently reestablished it. On October 21, the government of the autonomous region consented to move Aqqash Township (Akekashi) of Shushi County to the jurisdiction of Kashgar City. In July 2024, the Xinjiang Uygur Autonomous Region sanctioned the transfer of Lankan Township in Shushi County to the jurisdiction of Kashgar City. The government of the Xinjiang Autonomous Region has sanctioned the reallocation of Langan Township in Shushi County to the jurisdiction of Kashgar City.

== Administrative divisions ==
Shufu County included 4 towns, 6 townships.

Name	Simplified Chinese	Hanyu Pinyin	Uyghur (UEY)	Uyghur Latin (ULY)	Administrative division code
Towns
Tokkuzak Town (Tuokezhake, Toqquzaq)	托克扎克镇	Tuōkèzhākè Zhèn	توققۇزاق بازىرى	toqquzaq baziri	653121100
Lengger Town	兰干镇	Lángàn Zhèn	لەڭگەر بازىرى	lengger baziri	653121101
Oghusaq Town	吾库萨克镇	Wúkùsàkè Zhèn	ئوغۇساق بازىرى	Oghusaq baziri	653121102
Opal Town	乌帕尔镇	Wūpà'ěr Zhèn	ئوپال بازىرى	Opal baziri	653121103
Townships
Tashmiliq Township	塔什米里克乡	Tǎshímǐlǐkè Xiāng	تاشمىلىق يېزىسى	tashmiliq yëzisi	653121201
Tërim Township	铁日木乡	Tiěrìmù Xiāng	تېرىم يېزىسى	tërim yëzisi	653121202
Bulaqsu Township	布拉克苏乡	Bùlākèsū Xiāng	بۇلاقسۇ يېزىسى	bulaqsu yëzisi	653121203
Saybag Township	萨依巴格乡	Sàyībāgé Xiāng	سايباغ يېزىسى	saybagh yëzisi	653121204
Zemin Township	站敏乡	Zhànmǐn Xiāng	زەمىن يېزىسى	zemin yëzisi	653121205
Mush Township	木什乡	Mùshí Xiāng	مۇش يېزىسى	mush yëzisi	653121211

== Demographics ==
The proportion of nationalities in Shufu County, 2018
Nationality	Percentage
Uyghurs	98.0%
Han People	1.7%
Kyrgyz	0.2%
Others	0.1%
Source of the population statistics :

Historical population
Year	Pop.	±% p.a.
2000	345,282	—
2010	311,960	−1.01%

As of 2015, 271,556 of the 277,877 residents of the county were Uyghur, 5,406 were Han Chinese and 915 were from other ethnic groups.

As of 1999, 94.69% of the population of Konaxahar (Shufu) County was Uyghur and 5.02% of the population was Han Chinese.

== Economy ==
The county is an important area for wheat, corn, sorghum, cotton, and rice production in southern Xinjiang, as well as producing apricots, grapes, pomegranates, muskmelon, pistachio and other fruits. Industries include cotton spinning, food, cotton ginning and others.

== Transportation ==
- China National Highway 314

== Notable persons ==
- Abdur Rahman Kashgari
- Ismail Tiliwaldi

== Gallery ==
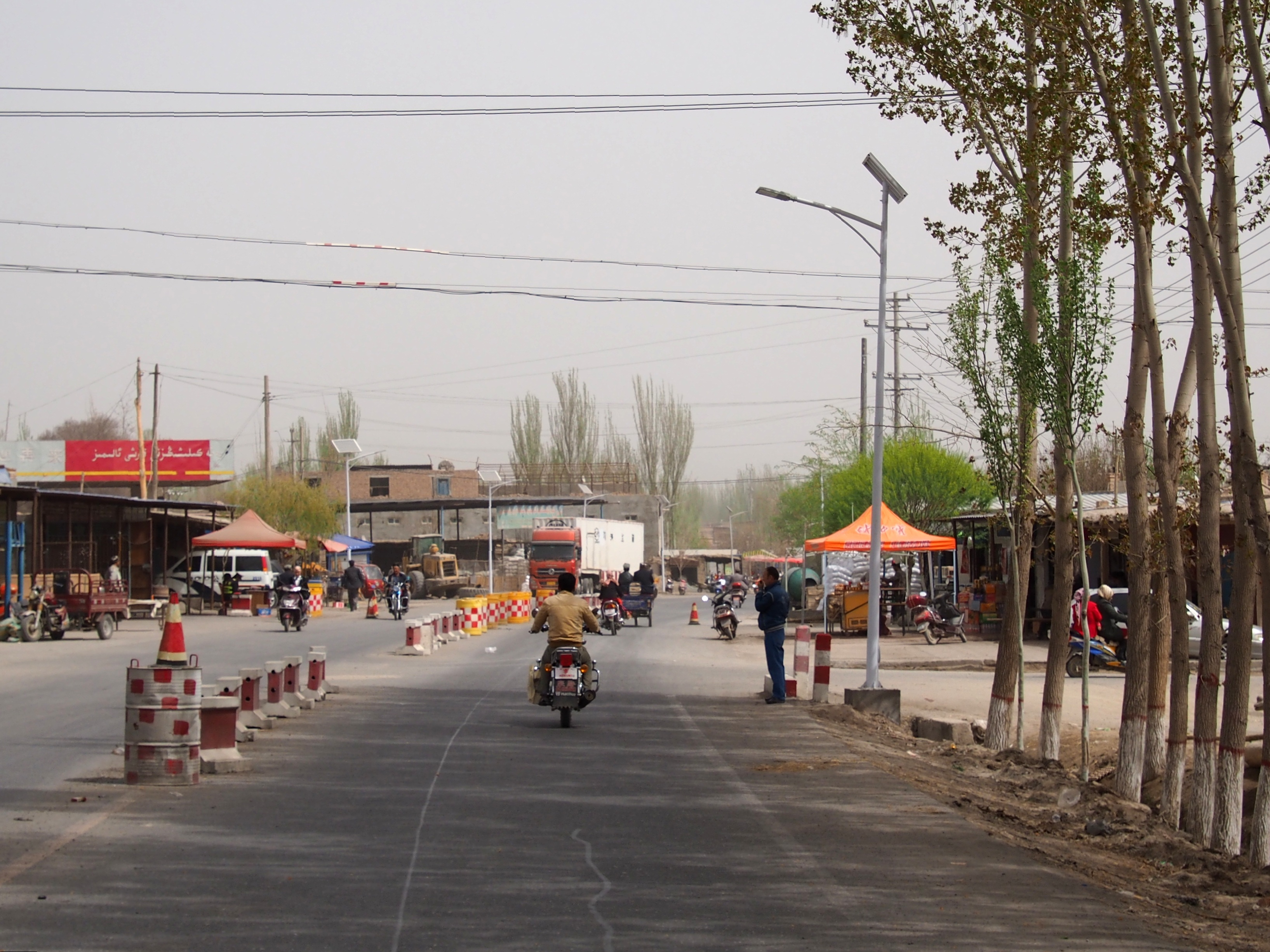

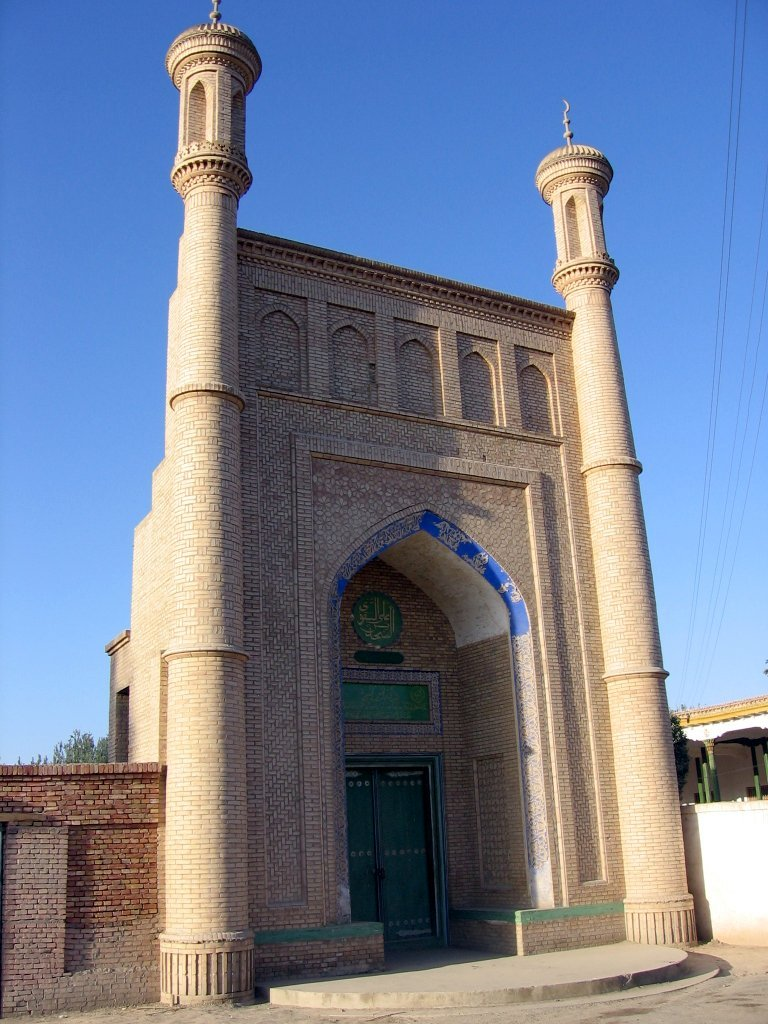

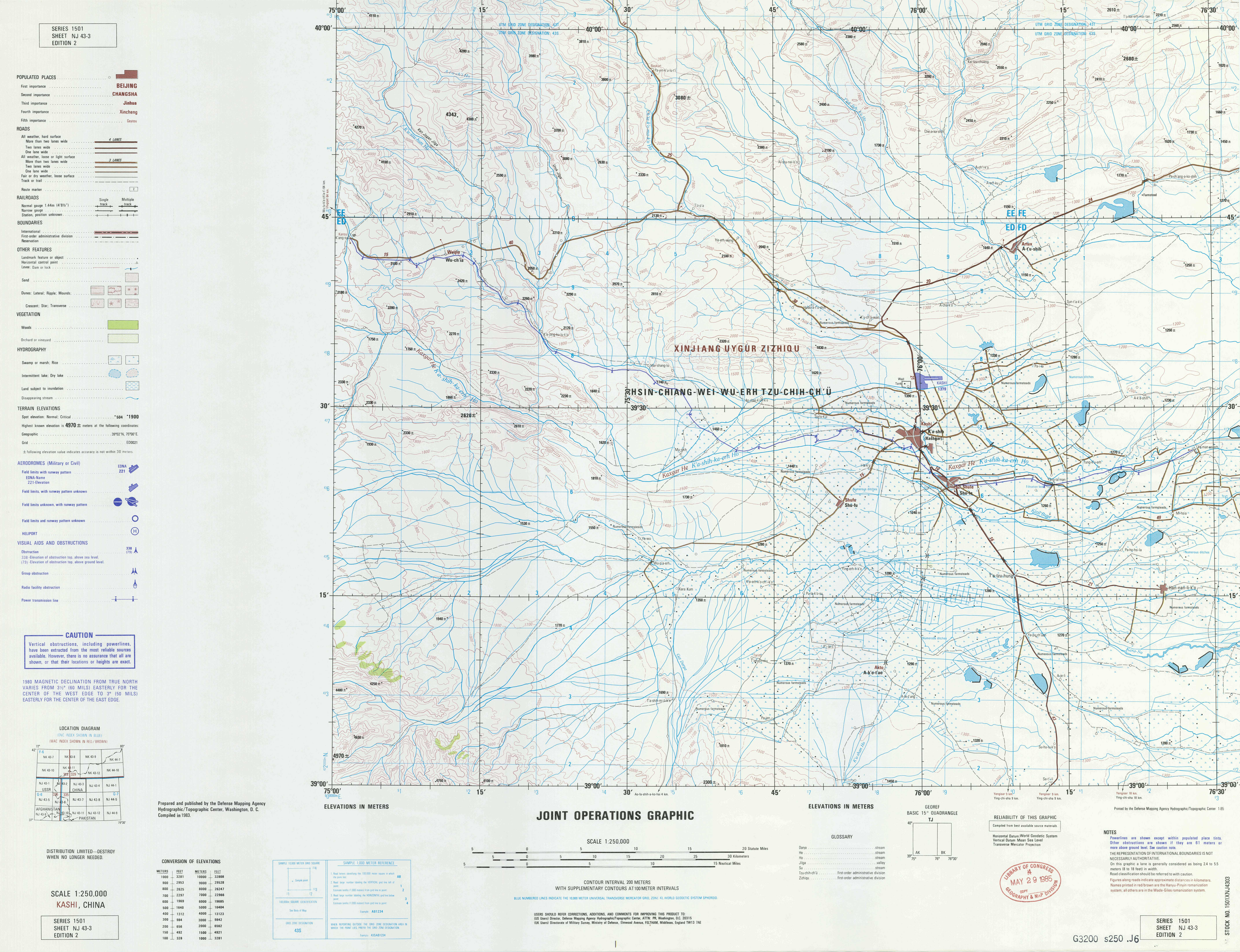
Map including Shufu (Shu-fu) (DMA, 1983)
