= Ablet Abdureshit =

Chinese politician (born 1942)

- 阿不来提·阿不都热西提; ئابلەت ئابدۇرىشىت

Vice Chairman of the Chinese People's Political Consultative Conference
- In office 13 March 2003 – 11 March 2013
- Chairman: Jia Qinglin

Chairman of Xinjiang
- In office January 1993 – January 2003
- Preceded by: Tömür Dawamat
- Succeeded by: Ismail Tiliwaldi

Vice Chairman of Xinjiang
- In office 1991–1993
- Chairman: Tömür Dawamat

Personal details
- Born: March 1942 (age 84) Yining, Xinjiang, China
- Party: Chinese Communist Party
- Education: Xinjiang Institute of Technology

Chinese name
- Simplified Chinese: 阿不来提·阿不都热西提
- Traditional Chinese: 阿不來提·阿不都熱西提
Transcriptions
Standard Mandarin
- Hanyu Pinyin: Ābùláití Ābùdūrèxītí

Uyghur name
- Uyghur: ئابلەت ئابدۇرىشىت
Transcriptions
- Latin Yëziqi: Ablet Abdureshit

Ablet Abdureshit (Chinese: 阿不来提·阿不都热西提; Uyghur: ئابلەت ئابدۇرىشىت; born March 1942) was the Chairman of Xinjiang, China, from 1993 to 2003. He also served as the vice chairman of 11th Chinese People's Political Consultative Conference (CPPCC).

== Biography ==
He was born in Yining in March 1942, joined the Chinese Communist Party in July 1960 and started working in September 1965. He graduated from department of electrical mechanics of Xinjiang Institute of Technology, and holds the title of senior engineer.

From 1991 to 1993, he served as vice chairman of Xinjiang Uyghur Autonomous Region. In 1993, he was appointed acting chairman and vice party chief of Xinjiang. He was confirmed as the chairman of the region in 1994 and served this post until 2003. From January to May 2003, he was the chairman of Xinjiang People's Congress. He was elected to vice chairman of 10th Chinese People's Political Consultative Conference in March 2003 and was re-elected in March 2008.

He was chosen President of the China-Africa Friendship Association (CAFA) at the Fourth Council of CAFA in November 2003. Re-elected at the Fifth Council of CAFA on November 28, 2011, he resigned from his presidency on November 25, 2019, and carried on serving on the Sixth Council.

He was a member of 15th, 16th and 17th Central Committees of the Chinese Communist Party.

Government offices
Preceded by Tömür Dawamat	Chairman of Xinjiang; 1993–2003	Succeeded by Ismail Tiliwaldi
