= Memtimin Qadir =

Chinese politician (born 1965)

- مەمتىمىن قادىر

Mayor of Ürümqi
- In office 20 April 2021 – March 2023
- Party Secretary: Xu Hairong; Yang Fasen
- Preceded by: Yasin Sadiq
- Succeeded by: Yaqup Peytulla

Mayor of Turpan
- In office January 2018 – April 2021
- Party Secretary: Zhang Wensheng
- Preceded by: Menglik Siyit
- Succeeded by: Qeyser Qeyyum

Personal details
- Born: November 1965 (age 60) Aksu Prefecture, Xinjiang, China
- Party: Chinese Communist Party
- Education: Central Party School of the Chinese Communist Party

Chinese name
- Simplified Chinese: 买买提明·卡德
- Traditional Chinese: 買買提明·卡德
Transcriptions
Standard Mandarin
- Hanyu Pinyin: Mǎimǎitímíng Kǎdé

Memtimin Qadir (Uyghur: مەمتىمىن قادىر, romanized: Memtimin Qadir; Chinese: 买买提明·卡德; pinyin: Mǎimǎitímíng Kǎdé, born November 1965) is a Chinese politician of Uyghur origin who has been the mayor of Ürümqi since 20 April 2021. He previously served as mayor of Turpan from 2018 to 2021. He is a delegate to the 13th National People's Congress.

== Biography ==
Memtimin Qadir was born in Aksu Prefecture, Xinjiang, in November 1965. In 1981, he enrolled in the Health School of Aksu Prefecture, where he graduated in 1984. He joined the Chinese Communist Party (CCP) in March 1989.

In August 1984, he became an official at Keping People's Hospital and moved to Yuli People's Hospital in April 1986, where he eventually became vice president of the hospital in May 1992. In August 1993, he was appointed deputy head of the Organization Department of CCP Yuli County Committee, and then director of the Withdrawal Department of Bayingolin Mongolian Autonomous Prefecture People's Hospital in October 1995. He was promoted to be the Chinese Communist Party Deputy Committee Secretary of Luntai County in December 1997, concurrently holding the magistrate position since March 2001. In June 2007, he became deputy party branch secretary of the Science and Technology Bureau of Bayingolin Mongolian Autonomous Prefecture, concurrently serving as director since the following month. In December 2013, he was nominated as vice chairman of Bayingolin Mongolian Autonomous Prefecture People's Congress, confirmed in January 2014. He served as deputy mayor of Turpan in November 2017, and two month later promoted to the mayor position. In April 2021, he was rose to become mayor of a major city, of Ürümqi, the capital of Xinjiang.

Government offices
Preceded by Menglik Siyit	Mayor of Turpan; 2018–2021	Succeeded by Qeyser Qeyyum (克衣色尔·克尤木)
Preceded by Yasin Sadiq	Mayor of Ürümqi; 2021–2023	Succeeded by Yaqup Peytulla
