= Shaanxi University of Science and Technology =

University in Shaanxi, China

- Simplified Chinese: 陕西科技大学
- Traditional Chinese: 陝西科技大學
Transcriptions
Standard Mandarin
- Hanyu Pinyin: Shǎnxī Kējì Dàxué

Shaanxi University of Science & Technology is a university located in Shaanxi province, China.

It has a campus in Xianyang and a campus in Xi'an.

== History ==
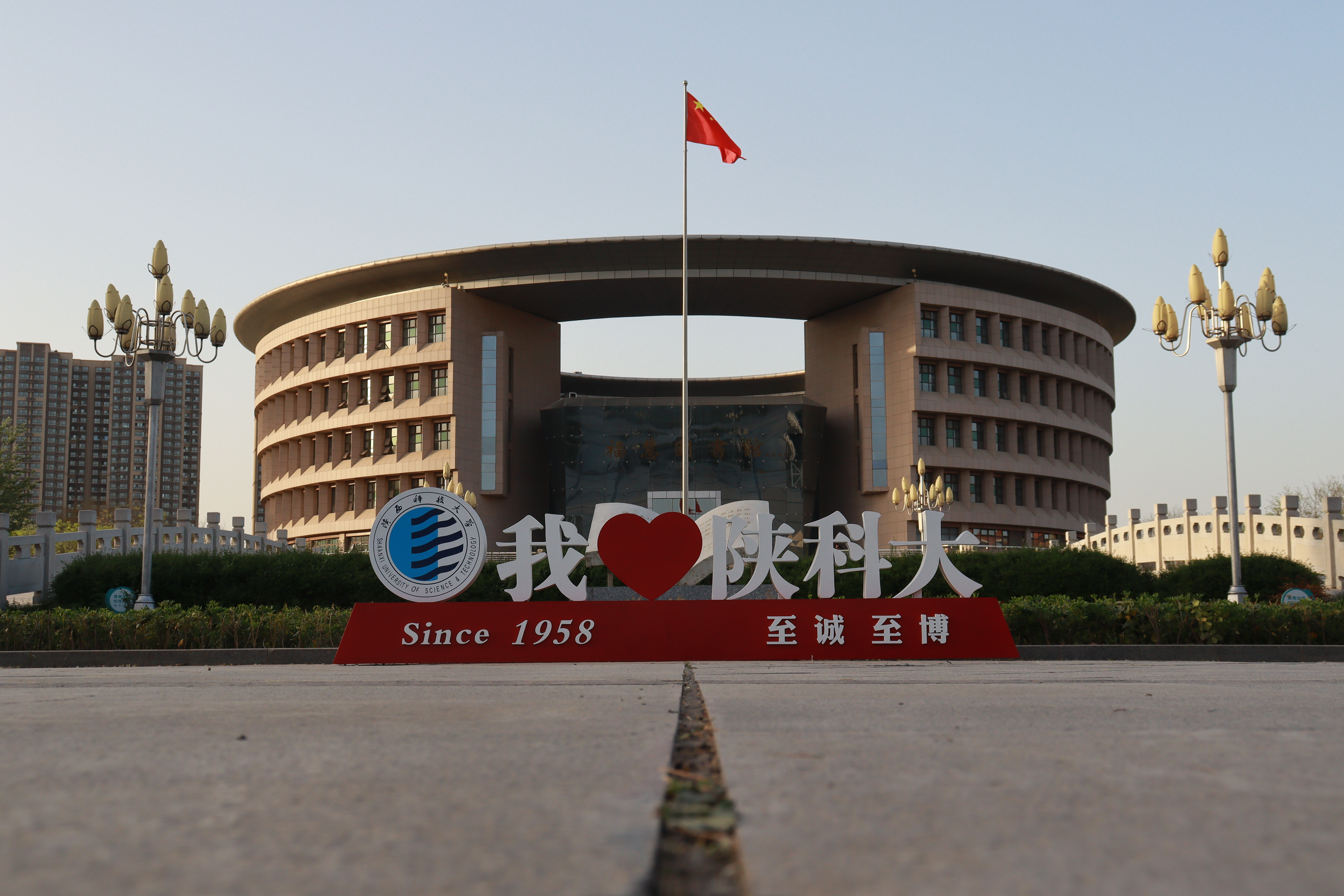
Library of Shaanxi University of Science & Technology

Founded in 1958 as Beijing Institute of Light Industry (BJILI), the university was under direct administration of former State Ministry of Light Industry and had been the first higher educational institute focusing on light industry since the founding of the People’s Republic of China in 1949. Then in 1970 BJILI was relocated to Xianyang City of Shaanxi Province where it merged with the Preparatory Office of Xianyang College of Light Industry and was granted a new name: Northwest Institute of Light Industry (NWILI). In 1978, NWILI was identified by the State Council as one of the 88 national key universities in China. After twenty years till 1998, NWILI was handed over to local provincial government from the central ministry and was incorporated in the system of "co-governance from central and provincial government with local governance as main part". Approved by the Ministry of Education in 2002, NWILI was named Shaanxi University of Science & Technology (SUST). After 2004, SUST opened a new campus in Xi'an. Then two years later in 2006, the mainpart of the university moved eastward to Xi'an, the capital city of Shaanxi Province.

== Faculty ==
- Chuanyi Wang - Distinguished Professor and Academic Dean in the School of Environmental Science and Engineering
