= Shohrat Zakir =

Chinese politician (born 1953)

- 雪克来提·扎克尔; شۆھرەت زاكىر
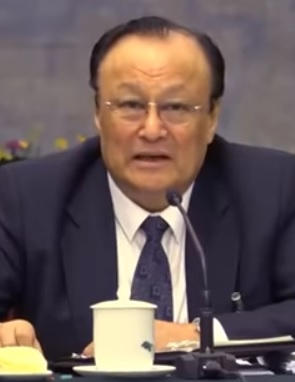

Vice Chairman of the Standing Committee of the National People's Congress
- Incumbent
- Assumed office March 10, 2023
- Chairman: Zhao Leji

Chairman of Xinjiang
- In office January 24, 2015 – September 30, 2021
- Preceded by: Nur Bekri
- Succeeded by: Erkin Tuniyaz

Chairman of the Xinjiang Uygur Autonomous Regional People's Congress
- In office January 2014 – December 2014
- Preceded by: Arken Imirbaki
- Succeeded by: Neyim Yasin

Mayor of Ürümqi
- In office March 2001 – December 2005; Acting: December 2000 – March 2001
- Preceded by: Nur Bekri
- Succeeded by: Neyim Yasin

Personal details
- Born: August 1953 (age 72) Yining (Ghulja), Xinjiang, China
- Party: Chinese Communist Party
- Parent: Abdulla Zakirov

Chinese name
- Simplified Chinese: 雪克来提·扎克尔
- Traditional Chinese: 雪克來提·扎克爾
Transcriptions
Standard Mandarin
- Hanyu Pinyin: Xuěkèláití Zhākè'ěr

Uyghur name
- Uyghur: شۆھرەت زاكىر
Transcriptions
- Latin Yëziqi: Shöhret Zakir
- Siril Yëziqi: Шɵһрəт Закир

Shohrat Zakir (Chinese: 雪克来提·扎克尔; Uyghur: شۆھرەت زاكىر; born August 1953) is a Chinese politician of Uyghur ethnicity who served as the chairman of Xinjiang and the deputy secretary of the Chinese Communist Party Xinjiang Committee from 2014 to 2021.

Born in Yining (Ghulja), he studied computer science in Hubei Province, and later attended Tianjin University. Between 2000 and 2005, he served as the mayor of Ürümqi. He served as the chairman of the Xinjiang Uyghur Autonomous Region between 2015 and 2021. Between 2017 and 2022, he was a member of the Central Committee of the Chinese Communist Party. In March 2023, he was appointed a vice chairman of the Standing Committee of the National People's Congress.

== Early life ==
Born in Yining, Zakir was born into a family with revolutionary history. His grandfather Kaur Zakir was a progressive thinker during the warlord era and was executed by state agents of the warlord Sheng Shicai along with Mao Zemin and Chen Tanqiu. His father Abdulla Zakirov was one of the earliest ethnic Uyghurs to join the Xinjiang party organization shortly after the foundation of the People's Republic in 1949. Prior to the Cultural Revolution, Zakir's father was a member of the regional standing committee and Vice Chairman of Xinjiang.

Between 1970 and 1972, Zakir was involved in the "Down to the Countryside Movement" in rural Xinjiang. He then worked as a teacher in an elementary school in Ürümqi. He was transferred to Diwobao school in 1974. In March 1978, he left his homeland for Hubei to attend the Jianghan Petroleum College (now Yangtze University) located in Jingzhou to study computer science. He then returned to Xinjiang to serve as a researcher at an earth sciences institute. In June 1984, he joined government, working for the regional economic committee.

== Career ==
Between 1982 and 1986, Zakir obtained an English degree at the Urumqi Vocational College. During this time he also joined the Chinese Communist Party. He then worked in a series of roles supporting economic growth and trade in the regional government. In March 2001, he was named mayor of Urumqi. Beginning in December 2005 he worked for the Xinjiang Production and Construction Corps. In 2007, he also earned an Executive MBA from Tianjin University. At the 2008 National People's Congress Zakir was selected to become a member of the National Ethnic Affairs Committee of the National People's Congress. In June 2011, he became vice-chair of the State Ethnic Affairs Commission. In January 2014, he became Chairman of the Xinjiang People's Congress and in December 2014, he was named Chairman of Xinjiang, replacing Nur Bekri.

In March 2019, addressing the issue of the widespread internment of ethnic minorities in Xinjiang, Zakir said that the camps were "training centers" rather than "concentration camps" as otherwise claimed and that the freedom of "trainees" was not restricted and that the camps were boarding schools where trainees could go home or ask for leave.

On October 23, 2021, he was appointed vice chairperson of the National People's Congress Ethnic Affairs Committee.

On March 10, 2023, during the 14th National People's Congress, he was appointed Vice Chairman of the Standing Committee of the National People's Congress.

== Sanctions ==
On December 10, 2021, the U.S. Department of the Treasury added Zakir to its Specially Designated Nationals (SDN) list. Individuals on the list have their assets blocked and U.S. persons are generally prohibited from dealing with them.

On December 10, 2024, on International Human Rights Day, Minister of Foreign Affairs of Canada Mélanie Joly announced Canada's sanctions against Zakir and seven other government officials of Xinjiang and Tibet involved in serious human rights violations.

Government offices
Preceded by Nur Bekri	Chairman of Xinjiang; 2014–2021	Succeeded by Erkin Tuniyaz
Preceded by Nur Bekri	Mayor of Ürümqi; 2001–2005	Succeeded by Neyim Yasin
Assembly seats
Preceded by Arken Imirbaki	Chairman of the Xinjiang Uygur Autonomous Regional People's Congress; 2014	Succeeded by Neyim Yasin
