= Neyim Yasin =

Chinese politician

- نەيىم ياسىن

Chairman of the Standing Committee of the People's Congress of Xinjiang Uygur Autonomous Region
- In office 24 January 2015 – 26 January 2018
- Preceded by: Shohrat Zakir
- Succeeded by: Shewket Imin

President of Higher People's Court of Xinjiang Uygur Autonomous Region
- In office January 2012 – January 2015
- Preceded by: Roza Isma'il
- Succeeded by: Mutellip Obul

Personal details
- Born: November 1952 (age 73) Turpan, Xinjiang, China
- Party: Chinese Communist Party
- Education: Xinjiang University

Chinese name
- Simplified Chinese: 乃依木·亚森
- Traditional Chinese: 乃依木·亞森
Transcriptions
Standard Mandarin
- Hanyu Pinyin: Nǎiyīmù Yàsēn

Neyim Yasin (Uyghur: نەيىم ياسىن; Chinese: 乃依木·亚森; born November 1952) is a Chinese politician of Uyghur origin, currently serving as vice chairperson of the National People's Congress Ethnic Affairs Committee. He previously served as chairman of the Standing Committee of the People's Congress of Xinjiang Uygur Autonomous Region from 2015 to 2018 and president of Higher People's Court of Xinjiang Uygur Autonomous Region from 2012 to 2015.

He was a delegate to the 12th National People's Congress and is a delegate to the 13th National People's Congress. He is a representative of the 19th National Congress of the Chinese Communist Party.

== Biography ==
Neyim Yasin was born in Turpan, Xinjiang, in November 1952. In 1972, he entered Ürümqi First Normal School and studied for a year. After graduating, he became a teacher in a township of Ürümqi. In 1975, he enrolled at Xinjiang University, majoring in political education.

Neyim Yasin worked in the United Front Work Department of Turpan Municipal Committee of the Chinese Communist Party after university in 1978, and eventually rose to become deputy head in January 1984. He was promoted to be deputy party secretary of Ürümqi in May 1985, concurrently holding the mayor position since February 1990. He became secretary of the Xinjiang Uygur Autonomous Region Party Committee of the Communist Youth League of China in December 1991, and served until May 1994, when he was appointed director of Xinjiang Uygur Autonomous Region Tourism Administration. In January 2006, he was transferred back to Ürümqi Municipal People's Government and served again as mayor. In January 2008, he became vice chairman of the Standing Committee of the People's Congress of Xinjiang Uygur Autonomous Region, and held that office until January 2012, when he was made president of Higher People's Court of Xinjiang Uygur Autonomous Region. In January 2015, he was elevated to chairman of the Standing Committee of the People's Congress of Xinjiang Uygur Autonomous Region, succeeding Shohrat Zakir. In March 2018, he took up the post of vice chairperson of the National People's Congress Ethnic Affairs Committee.

Party political offices
Preceded by Bextiyar Hapiz	Secretary of the Xinjiang Uygur Autonomous Region Party Committee of the Communist Youth League of China; 1991–1994	Succeeded by Shewket Imin
Government offices
Preceded by ?	Director of Xinjiang Uygur Autonomous Region Tourism Administration; 1994–2006	Succeeded by Muzapar Mijit
Preceded by Shohrat Zakir	Mayor of Ürümqi; 2006–2008	Succeeded by Jerla Isamudin
Legal offices
Preceded by Roza Isma'il	President of Higher People's Court of Xinjiang Uygur Autonomous Region; 2012–2015	Succeeded by Mutellip Obul
Assembly seats
Preceded by Shohrat Zakir	Chairman of the Standing Committee of the People's Congress of Xinjiang Uygur Autonomous Region; 2015–2018	Succeeded by Shewket Imin
