= Shewket Imin =

Chinese politician (born 1959)

- شەۋكەت ئىمىن

Chairman of the Standing Committee of the People's Congress of Xinjiang Uygur Autonomous Region
- In office 26 January 2018 – 18 January 2023
- Preceded by: Neyim Yasin
- Succeeded by: Zumret Obul

Personal details
- Born: December 1959 (age 66) Manas County, Xinjiang, China
- Party: Chinese Communist Party
- Education: Xinjiang Normal University

Chinese name
- Simplified Chinese: 肖开提·依明
- Traditional Chinese: 肖開提·依明
Transcriptions
Standard Mandarin
- Hanyu Pinyin: Xiāokāití Yīmíng

Shewket Imin (Uyghur: شەۋكەت ئىمىن; Shewket Imin; born December 1959) is a Chinese politician of Uyghur origin, currently serving as chairman of the Standing Committee of the People's Congress of Xinjiang Uygur Autonomous Region.

He was a delegate to the 12th National People's Congress and is a delegate to the 13th National People's Congress.

== Biography ==
Shewket Imin was born in Manas County, Xinjiang, in December 1959. From October 1977 to October 1979, he was a teacher at Xinhe High School in his home-county. In 1979, he was admitted to Xinjiang Normal University, majoring in track and field. He joined the Chinese Communist Party in June 1981. After graduating in 1983, he stayed at the university and worked there for eight years.

In December 1991, he was appointed deputy party secretary of Turpan and two years later was admitted to member of the standing committee of the Turpan Party Committee, the city's top authority. He also served as secretary of its Commission for Discipline Inspection, the party's agency in charge of anti-corruption efforts. In April 1994, he was appointed secretary of the Xinjiang Uygur Autonomous Region Party Committee of the Communist Youth League of China, a position he held until October 1998, when he was transferred to Ili Kazakh Autonomous Prefecture and appointed deputy party secretary. In July 2000, he moved back to Ürümqi and became director of Radio, Film and Television Administration of Xinjiang Uygur Autonomous Region. In December 2004, he was promoted to member of the standing committee of the Xinjiang Party Committee, the region's top authority. He concurrently served as head of United Front Work Department of Xinjiang Uygur Autonomous Region Committee of the Chinese Communist Party. On 26 January 2018, he was proposed as chairman of the Standing Committee of the People's Congress of Xinjiang Uygur Autonomous Region.

Party political offices
Preceded by Neyim Yasin	Secretary of the Xinjiang Uygur Autonomous Region Party Committee of the Communist Youth League of China; 1994–1998	Succeeded by Erkenjiang Turahon
Preceded by Cheng Zhenshan	Head of United Front Work Department of Xinjiang Uygur Autonomous Region Committee of the Chinese Communist Party; 2016–2018	Succeeded by Zumret Obul
Government offices
Preceded by ?	Director of Radio, Film and Television Administration of Xinjiang Uygur Autonomous Region; 2000–2004	Succeeded by Ilhan Osman
Assembly seats
Preceded by Neyim Yasin	Chairman of the Standing Committee of the People's Congress of Xinjiang Uygur Autonomous Region; 2018–2023	Succeeded by Zumret Obul
