= Erkin Tuniyaz =

Chinese politician (born 1961)

- ئەركىن تۇنىياز 艾尔肯·吐尼亚孜
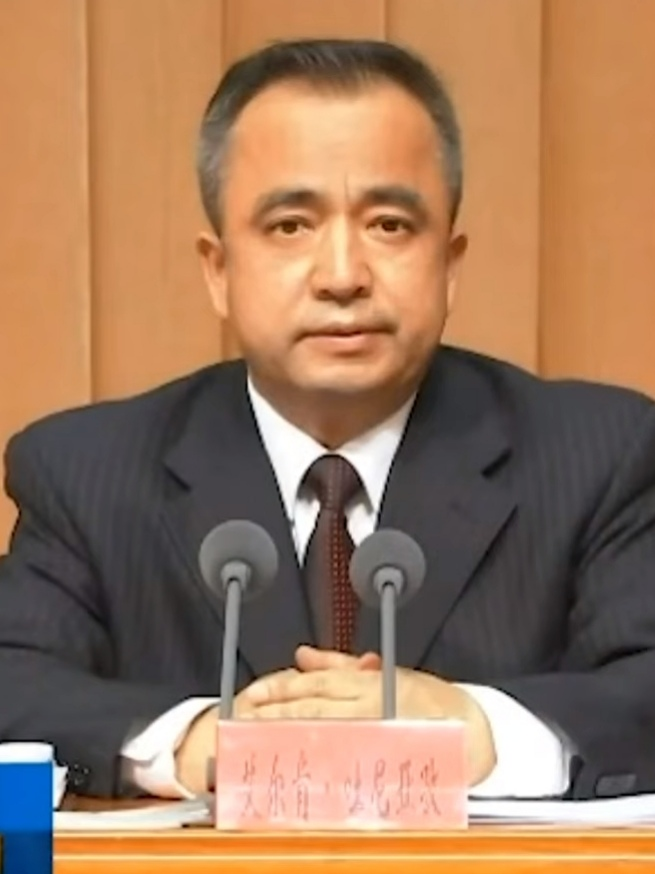
- Erkin in 2021

Chairman of Xinjiang
- Incumbent
- Assumed office 27 January 2022 (acting from 30 September 2021)
- Party Secretary: Chen Quanguo; Ma Xingrui; Chen Xiaojiang
- Preceded by: Shohrat Zakir

Personal details
- Born: December 1961 (age 64) Aksu County, Xinjiang, China
- Party: Chinese Communist Party
- Education: Changji Normal School; Shaanxi Normal University; Xinjiang University; Central Party School of the Chinese Communist Party

Chinese name
- Simplified Chinese: 艾尔肯·吐尼亚孜
- Traditional Chinese: 艾爾肯·吐尼亞孜
Transcriptions
Standard Mandarin
- Hanyu Pinyin: Ài'ěrkěn Tǔníyàzī

Uyghur name
- Uyghur: ئەركىن تۇنىياز

Erkin Tuniyaz (Note: Uyghur: ئەركىن تۇنىياز, Erkin Tuniyaz; Chinese: 艾尔肯·吐尼亚孜; pinyin: Ài'ěrkěn Tǔníyàzī) (also spelled Arkin Tuniyaz; born December 1961) is a Chinese politician of Uyghur ethnicity who is the current deputy secretary of the Chinese Communist Party Xinjiang Committee and Chairman of Xinjiang, in office since 30 September 2021. He is a member of the 20th Central Committee of the Chinese Communist Party.

== Biography ==
Erkin Tuniyaz was born in Aksu County, Xinjiang, in December 1961.

After graduating from Changji Normal School in 1983, he stayed at the university and worked successively as deputy secretary and secretary of the Communist Youth League of China. After a short period of working in the Department of Personnel Matters of Xinjiang Uygur Autonomous Region in August 1992, he was dispatched to the Organization Department of the CCP's Xinjiang Uygur Autonomous Region Committee, where he eventually rose to become deputy head in October 1999. In February 2005, he was transferred to Hotan Prefecture and appointed deputy party secretary and mayor. In January 2008, he was appointed vice chairman of Xinjiang, and was promoted to member of the standing committee of the CCP Xinjiang Regional Committee, the region's top authority. On 30 September 2021, he was named acting chairman of Xinjiang, replacing Shohrat Zakir. On 27 January 2022, he was formally elected as the chairman by the 13th People's Congress of the Xinjiang Uyghur Autonomous Region at its fifth session. On 18 January 2023, he was elected as the chairman for a full term by the 14th People's Congress of the Xinjiang Uyghur Autonomous Region.

He was an alternate member of the 19th Central Committee of the Chinese Communist Party and a member of the 20th Central Committee of the Chinese Communist Party.

=== Sanctions ===
On 10 December 2021, the U.S. Department of the Treasury added Erkin to its Specially Designated Nationals (SDN) list. Individuals on the list have their assets blocked and U.S. persons are generally prohibited from dealing with them.

On 10 December 2024, on International Human Rights Day, Minister of Foreign Affairs of Canada Mélanie Joly announced Canada's sanctions against Erkin and seven other government officials of Xinjiang and Tibet involved in serious human rights violations.

== Notes ==
Government offices
Preceded by Ghopur Abdulla	Mayor of Hotan Prefecture; 2005–2008	Succeeded by Jür'et Emin
Preceded by Shohrat Zakir	Chairman of Xinjiang; 2021–present	Incumbent
