= Bademala =

- 巴德玛拉

Chairperson of the Standing Committee of the Bortala Mongol Autonomous Prefectural People's Congress
- In office January 2022 – August 2024
- Preceded by: Qiu Shuhua
- Succeeded by: Zhao Qing

Governor of Bortala Mongol Autonomous Prefecture
- In office January 2016 – May 2021
- Preceded by: Ochir
- Succeeded by: Liu Xin

Personal details
- Born: May 1961 (age 65) Wenquan County, Xinjiang Uygur Autonomous Region, China
- Party: Chinese Communist Party
- Education: Xinjiang Agricultural University

Chinese name
- Simplified Chinese: 巴德玛拉
- Traditional Chinese: 巴德瑪拉
Transcriptions
Standard Mandarin
- Hanyu Pinyin: Bādémǎlā

Bademala (Mongolian: ᠪᠠᠳᠠᠨᠠᠯᠠ; Chinese: 巴德玛拉; born May 1961) is a former Chinese politician Mongol ethnicity who spent his entire career in northwest China's Xinjiang Uygur Autonomous Region. He was investigated by China's top anti-graft agency in November 2025. Previously he served as chairperson of the Standing Committee of the Bortala Mongol Autonomous Prefectural People's Congress and before that, governor of Bortala Mongol Autonomous Prefecture.

Bademala was a delegate to the 13th National Committee of the Chinese People's Political Consultative Conference (CPPCC).

== Early life and education ==
Bademala was born into a Mongol ethnic family in May 1961 in Wenquan County, Xinjiang Uygur Autonomous Region. After the resumption of the college entrance examination, in 1980, he enrolled at Xinjiang August 1st Agricultural College (now part of Xinjiang Agricultural University), majoring in agricultural economic management.

== Career ==
Bademala began his political career in August 1984 as a staff member in the Audit Bureau of Bortala Mongol Autonomous Prefecture. He rose through the ranks in the audit system, eventually becoming chief of the Enterprise Audit Division in November 1991. He joined the Chinese Communist Party (CCP) in January 1993.

In 1994, Bademala moved to local government, serving as assistant to the mayor of Bole City. Over a year later, he held positions as deputy head of the Organization Department of the CCP Bortala Prefectural Committee. In November 1997, he became deputy party secretary and mayor of Bole City, rising to mayor in February of the following year. In April 2004, he was promoted to vice governor of Bortala Mongol Autonomous Prefecture. In September 2007, he was admitted to standing committee member of the CCP Bortala Mongol Autonomous Prefectural Committee, the prefecture's top authority. In November 2015, he was named deputy party secretary and acting governor, confirmed in January 2016. During his tenure as governor, he was known for advocating for the "Port Strong Prefecture" strategy, focusing on developing the Alashankou port as a key logistics hub for the China-Europe Railway Express. In January 2022, he transitioned to the role of chairperson of the Standing Committee of the Bortala Mongol Autonomous Prefectural People's Congress, the prefecture's top legislative body. He served in this position until August 2024, when his resignation from the post was accepted.

== Investigation ==
On 21 November 2025, Bademala was put under investigation for alleged "serious violations of discipline and laws" by the Central Commission for Discipline Inspection (CCDI), the party's internal disciplinary body, and the National Supervisory Commission, the highest anti-corruption agency of China.

Government offices
Preceded by Ochir	Governor of Bortala Mongol Autonomous Prefecture; 2016–2021	Succeeded by Liu Xin (刘欣)
Assembly seats
Preceded by Qiu Shuhua (邱树华)	Chairperson of the Standing Committee of the Bortala Mongol Autonomous Prefectural People's Congress; 2022–2024	Succeeded by Zhao Qing (赵青)
