= Ren Hua =

Chinese politician

- 任华

Vice-Chairwoman of the Xinjiang Uyghur Autonomous Region
- In office January 2018 – June 2020
- Chairman: Shohrat Zakir

Personal details
- Born: March 1964 (age 62) Yantai, Shandong, China
- Party: Chinese Communist Party (1984–2020; expelled)
- Education: Xinjiang University; Xinjiang University of Finance and Economics

Chinese name
- Traditional Chinese: 任華
- Simplified Chinese: 任华
Transcriptions
Standard Mandarin
- Hanyu Pinyin: Rén Huá

Ren Hua (Chinese: 任华; pinyin: Rén Huá; born March 1964) is a former Chinese politician who spent her entire career in northwest China's Xinjiang Uyghur Autonomous Region. As of June 2020 she was under investigation by the Communist Party's anti-corruption agency. Previously she served as vice-chairwoman of Xinjiang Uygur Autonomous Region. Her superiors, Li Zhi and Nur Bekri, both were sacked for graft in 2015 and 2019, respectively. Ren is the first senior official in Xinjiang and the fifth senior official in China to be targeted by China's top anticorruption watchdog in 2020. She is also the fifth female ministerial level official in China caught since Xi Jinping's continues an anti-graft dragnet at all levels of government, military and ruling Communist Party.

== Early life and education ==
Ren was born in Yantai, Shandong, in March 1964. In September 1982, she was accepted to Xinjiang University, where she majored in Chinese language and literature. She joined the Chinese Communist Party in November 1984. She also earned a master's degree in business administration from Xinjiang University of Finance and Economics in December 2012.

== Career ==
After university in July 1986, she was assigned as a cadre to General Office of the Party Committee of Xinjiang Uygur Autonomous Region and over a period of 20 years worked her way up to the position of deputy director. In September 2006, she became head of the Publicity Department of CCP Ürümqi Municipal Committee and chairwoman of Ürümqi Federation of Social Sciences. During her term in office, she reported to Li Zhi, who was Ürümqi's Party secretary from 2006 to 2009. She was deputy director and Party branch secretary of the Department of Culture of Xinjiang Uygur Autonomous Region in March 2013, she concurrently served as deputy director of the Publicity Department of the Party Committee of Xinjiang Uygur Autonomous Region in August 2017 and vice-chairwoman of Xinjiang Uygur Autonomous Region in January 2018.

== Investigation ==
On June 1, 2020, she was put under investigation for alleged "serious violations of discipline and laws" by the Central Commission for Discipline Inspection (CCDI), the party's internal disciplinary body, and the National Supervisory Commission, the highest anti-corruption agency of China. Ren is the fifth senior official to be investigated in 2020. The others are former Fujian vice-governor Zhang Zhinan, former deputy public security minister Sun Lijun, former Hebei vice-governor Zhang He, and former chairman of China Shipbuilding Industry Corporation Hu Wenming. On November 30, she had been expelled from the Chinese Communist Party and removed from public office. On December 16, she was arrested for suspected bribe taking as per a decision made by the Supreme People's Procuratorate.

On 29 July 2021, she stood trial at the Intermediate People's Court of Suzhou on charges of taking bribes. Prosecutors accused Ren of taking advantage of her different positions in Xinjiang between 2007 and 2020 to seek profits for various companies and individuals in contracting projects, enterprise operations, bank loans, job promotions and work transfers. In return, she accepted money and property worth over 47.15 million yuan ($7.3 million).

Party political offices
Preceded by Han Ziyong	Party Branch Secretary of Department of Culture and Tourism of Xinjiang Uygur Autonomous Region; 2013–2020	Succeeded by Hou Hanmin
Preceded by Liang Chao	Party Branch Secretary of Department of Education of Xinjiang Uygur Autonomous Region; 2018–2020	Succeeded by Hu Yanzhen
