= Fourth Affiliated Hospital of Xinjiang Medical University =

Geography
- Location: Urumqi, Xinjiang, China
- Coordinates: 43.789995°N 87.602214°E

Organisation
- Type: Teaching
- Affiliated university: Xinjiang Medical University

Services
- Emergency department: Yes

History
- Founded: 1959

Links
- Lists: Hospitals in China

The Fourth Affiliated Hospital of Xinjiang Medical University, also known as the Xinjiang Uyghur Autonomous Region Hospital of Traditional Chinese Medicine (Chinese: 新疆维吾尔自治区中医医院), is a teaching hospital in Urumqi, Xinjiang, China affiliated with the College of Traditional Chinese Medicine of Xinjiang Medical University. It has served Xinjiang Medical University students since 1959. It has 938 staff, among which there are 812 professionals and 48 technicians. The hospital has one branch and three out-patient departments at different places, including one rehabilitation center.
