= College of Traditional Chinese Medicine of Xinjiang Medical University =

College in Xinjiang, China

Coordinates: 43.8352°N 87.5811°E

- Type: Public
- Established: 1961
- Dean: Lijuan (Chinese: 单丽)
- Faculty: 76
- Students: 850
- Location: Ürümqi, Xinjiang, China
- Campus: Urban

The College of Traditional Chinese Medicine of Xinjiang Medical University (Chinese: 新疆医科大学中医学院) is a degree awarding college working as a subsidiary of the Xinjiang Medical University, is the only autonomous institution of a higher Chinese medicine study in Urumqi. On May 31, 1985, the State Education Commission sanctioned the amount for the construction of the college building. In 1986, a new hospital building's construction started for the "under construction" college. On April 17, 1987, the Xinjiang government merged the college under the administration of the Xinjiang Medical University.

Plans are underway to form a separate Xinjiang University of Traditional Chinese Medicine (Chinese: 新疆中医药大学; pinyin: Xīnjiāng Zhōngyīyào Dàxué) as of 2026, though the final name of the new institution will depend on the decision from the Ministry of Education of the People's Republic of China, with Xinjiang College of Traditional Chinese Medicine (Chinese: 新疆中医药学院; pinyin: Xīnjiāng Zhōngyīyào Xuéyuàn) being a likelier result.

== See also ==
- List of universities and colleges in Xinjiang
