= Li Chenghui =

Chinese politician

- 李成辉

Communist Party Secretary of Hami
- In office November 2018 – May 2022
- Preceded by: Lu Shujiang
- Succeeded by: TBA

Personal details
- Born: January 1968 (age 58) Pingliang County, Gansu, China
- Party: Chinese Communist Party
- Education: Xinjiang Agricultural University

Chinese name
- Simplified Chinese: 李成辉
- Traditional Chinese: 李成輝
Transcriptions
Standard Mandarin
- Hanyu Pinyin: Lǐ Chénghuī

Li Chenghui (Chinese: 李成辉; born January 1968) is a former Chinese politician who spent his entire career in northwest China's Xinjiang Uygur Autonomous Region. He surrendered himself to the anti-corruption agency of China in May 2022. Previously he served as party secretary of Hami.

== Biography ==
Li was born in Pingliang County (now Pingliang), Gansu, in January 1968. In 1985, he entered Bayi Agricultural College (now Xinjiang Agricultural University), majoring in agronomy. After graduating in 1988, he taught at Manas County Vocational High School. In September 1994, he became a technician of Agricultural Technology Station in Tougong Township, Manas County.

Li became deputy leader of Tougong Township in January 1996, and joined the Chinese Communist Party (CCP) in July 1997. He was appointed deputy party secretary of Liuhudi in April 1999, concurrently holding the town leader position. He was deputy magistrate of Manas County in January 2001 and executive vice mayor of Changji in December 2005. In March 2008, he was named acting magistrate of Jimusar County, confirmed in January 2009. In February 2012, he was promoted to become party secretary of Fukang, a position he held until April 2015, when was recalled to Changji as party secretary. In February 2017, he was made deputy head of the Public Security Department of Xinjiang Uygur Autonomous Region, but having held the position for only one year. In June 2018, he became deputy party secretary of Kashgar Prefecture and deputy secretary of its Political and Legal Affairs Commission. In November 2018, he rose to become party secretary of Hami, his first foray into a prefectural leadership role.

=== Downfall ===
On 16 May 2022, he turned himself in and is cooperating with the Central Commission for Discipline Inspection (CCDI) and National Commission of Supervision for investigation of "suspected violations of disciplines and laws".

Party political offices
Preceded by ?	Communist Party Secretary of Changji; 2015–2017	Succeeded by Meng Fangang
Preceded by Lu Shujiang	Communist Party Secretary of Hami; 2018–2022	Succeeded by TBA
