= Zhang He (disambiguation) =

Zhang He was a military general in the Eastern Han dynasty of China

Other people with this name include:

- Zhang He (politician), Chinese politician

== See also ==
- Zhang River
- Zheng He
- Jang Hyuk, his name is transliterated as 張赫 in Hanja, a South Korean actor
