= Carol C. Baskin =

American plant ecologist

Carol C. Baskin is a professor at the University of Kentucky known for her work on plant ecology. She is affiliated with Biology, Ecology and Plant Sciences at the University.

== Early life and education ==
Baskin grew up in North Carolina on a tobacco farm. She received her early education at Montverde Academy, graduating in 1960. After this she had pursued her undergraduate studies at Florida Southern College, where she earned a Bachelor of Science degree in 1964. In 1968 she completed her Ph.D. in Biology at Vanderbilt University. She started as a professor at the University of Kentucky in 1999.

== Research ==
Baskin is known for her work in the field of plant ecology, specifically in her studies done on seed biology. Her research focuses on the ecological, biogeographical, and evolutionary parts of seed dormancy. She co-authored the book Seeds: Ecology, Biogeography, and Evolution of Dormancy and Germination, which was updated in 2014. This work examines seed dormancy types, their significance, and their role in the life cycles of plants all around the world. She has also worked on the conservation and biogeography of the plant taxa endemic to the limestone cedar glades in the eastern United States.

Carol has led extensive research at the Xinjiang Agriculture University alongside her husband. She is in charge of studying the adaptation mechanisms of plants endemic to the desert. Some areas of the province studied by her team over 7 years include Junggar Basin, Yili River Valley, Atlay Mountains, and Tarim Basin. Her contributions to the field are not limited to her own work as she constantly contributes and edits publications coming out of the province, solidifying her place as one of the most currently relevant scientists in the field

== Honors and awards ==
In 2001 Baskin and her husband, Jerry M. Baskin, were named distinguished fellows of the Botanical Society of America. Baskin received the 2012 Tianshan Award from Xinjiang Agricultural University. In 2017 she received the Seed Science Award from the Crop Science Society of America.

== Selected publications ==
- Baskin, Carol C.; Baskin, Jerry M. (1988). "Germination Ecophysiology of Herbaceous Plant Species in a Temperate Region". American Journal of Botany. 75 (2): 286–305. doi:10.1002/j.1537-2197.1988.tb13441.x. ISSN 1537-2197.
- Baskin, Carol C.; Baskin, Jerry M. (2001). Seeds. San Diego, Calif.: Elsevier. ISBN 978-0-12-080263-0.
- Baskin, Carol C. (2003). "Breaking Physical Dormancy in Seeds: Focussing on the Lens". The New Phytologist. 158 (2): 229–232. ISSN 0028-646X.
- Baskin, Jerry M.; Baskin, Carol C. (2004). "A classification system for seed dormancy". Seed Science Research. 14 (1): 1–16. doi:10.1079/SSR2003150. ISSN 0960-2585.
- Baskin, Carol C.; Baskin, Jerry M. (2007). "A revision of Martin's seed classification system, with particular reference to his dwarf-seed type". Seed Science Research. 17 (1): 11–20. doi:10.1017/S0960258507383189. ISSN 0960-2585.
