= First Affiliated Hospital of Xinjiang Medical University =

First Teaching Hospital of Xinjiang Medical University

Geography
- Location: Urumqi, Xinjiang, China
- Coordinates: 43.838768°N 87.584215°E

Organisation
- Type: Teaching
- Affiliated university: Xinjiang Medical University

Services
- Emergency department: Yes
- Beds: 1357

History
- Founded: 1956

Links
- Website: www1.xjmu.edu.cn/gjjyxyen/detail_page_ind.asp?articleid=683
- Lists: Hospitals in China

The First Affiliated Hospital of Xinjiang Medical University (Chinese: 新疆医科大学第一附属医院) is a teaching hospital in the western border of area of Urumqi, Xinjiang, China affiliated with Xinjiang Medical University. Founded in 1956 together with the university, the hospital is a college of clinical medicine affiliated with XMU. The hospital currently has 1357 beds with more than 1500 specialists.

The hospital also provides education in science and trains young doctors; it also aims to provide infrastructure for scientific research. The Ministry of Health has been supervising the management since the 1960s. It has also been awarded the title of being in top ten hospitals in northwest China. This hospitals was considered the preferred educational institution for the ethnic people of Xinjiang.

In June 2008, hospital management through a special fund has issued orders to build a new hospital building for the ever increasing number of patients in the city of Urumqi.

== History ==
Hospital was founded in 1956, the country's first Five-Year Plan for China Central Plains of the Soviet Union aid of 156 key construction projects. In 1997, the hospital decided to invest in the information technology projects and make it fully functional in May 2000. Now hospital has a fully operational computer network, it has also implemented the out-patient medical information card system, electronic records of clinical departments has also been started. The newly built 20,000 m^{2} Science and Technology Building has built up a new atmosphere of healthy competition in scientific research. Animal Research Centre is also being built by the fund of Xinjiang and Chinese Government funds.

== Structure ==
Hospital is covering a total of 168,000 m^{2}. The total construction area is 182,500 m^{2}, of which 106,500 m^{2} is having medical care structures, teaching area is 17,000 m^{2}, the research area is 12,700 m^{2}; approximately 44% area is covered by grass and parks. Hospital has a complete medical testing equipment and more conventional set of internationally advanced level of high-tech equipment.

== Departments ==
Hospital has been set up into 42 clinical and 11 medical technology departments. It now has 27 teaching and research, one clinical post-doctoral research station, three doctorate (in Clinical Medicine, surgery and medicine) research station, three masters-level research stations (in professional Clinical Medicine degree, professional degree of oral medicine and clinical medicine, covering 15 secondary subjects and 33 clinical subjects). Hospitals' clinical teaching building also have a nursing skills and training assessment center. It also has an Institute of Hydatid Disease; which is the most prevalent parasitic disease in Xinjiang.

== Staff ==
Gynecology department of First Affiliated Hospital

At present there are 2,100 beds in the hospital. The total number of staff is 1,894 and the total number of hospital workers' count goes to 2,800. There are 2325 health technicians, 262 highly trained health technicians, 62 PhD physicians, 301 Masters Level Physicians, 565 undergraduate health technicians, 1397 specialist physicians and surgeons.
