= Bole, Xinjiang =

City in northern Xinjiang, China

Bole 博乐市 (Chinese) Bortala
- County-level city

Name transcription(s)
  - Chinese: 博乐市
  - Uyghur: بۆرتالا شەھىرى
  - Mongolian: ᠪᠣᠷᠣᠲᠠᠯ᠎ᠠ ᠬᠣᠲᠠ
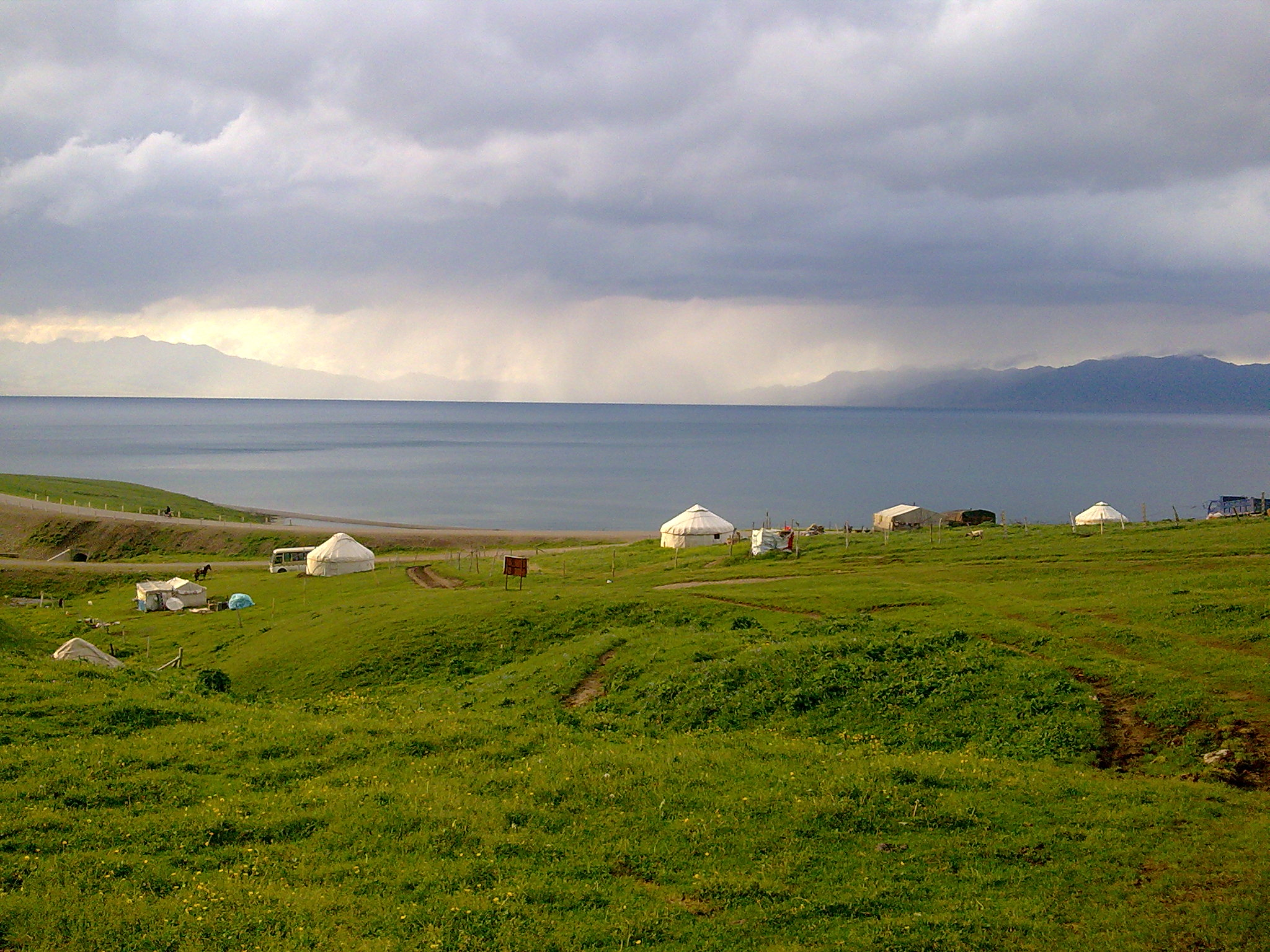
- Yurts by Sayram Lake

- Location in northern Xinjiang Bole (Xinjiang) Bole (China)
- Coordinates (Bole municipal government): 44°51′14″N 82°03′05″E
- Country: China
- Autonomous region: Xinjiang
- Autonomous prefecture: Bortala
- Municipal seat: Nanchengqu Subdistrict

Area
  - Total: 7,801.68 km^{2} (3,012.25 sq mi)
- Elevation: 662 m (2,172 ft)

Population (2020)
  - Total: 246,706
  - Density: 31.6222/km^{2} (81.9010/sq mi)
- Time zone: UTC+8 (China Standard (Note: Locals in Xinjiang frequently observe UTC+6 (Xinjiang Time), 2 hours behind Beijing.))
- Postal code: 833400
- Area code: 909
- Vehicle registration: 新E
- Website: www.xjbl.gov.cn

Bole, Xinjiang

Chinese name
- Simplified Chinese: 博乐
- Traditional Chinese: 博樂
Transcriptions
Standard Mandarin
- Hanyu Pinyin: Bólè

Alternative Chinese name
- Simplified Chinese: 博尔塔拉
- Traditional Chinese: 博爾塔拉
Transcriptions
Standard Mandarin
- Hanyu Pinyin: Bó'ěrtǎlā

Mongolian name
- Mongolian Cyrillic: Бортал
- Mongolian script: ᠪᠣᠷᠣᠲᠠᠯ᠎ᠠ

Uyghur name
- Uyghur: بۆرتالا
Transcriptions
- Latin Yëziqi: Börtala
- Yengi Yeziⱪ: Bɵrtala
- SASM/GNC: Bortala
- Siril Yëziqi: Бөртала

Oirat name
- Oirat: ᡋᡆᠷᡆᡐᠠᠯᠠ ᡍᡆᡐᡆᠨ; Borotala xoton

Bole (English: /ˈbɒlə/ BO-lə), also known by its Mongolian name Bortala (lit. 'brown steppe'), is a county-level city in Xinjiang, China. It is the seat of Bortala Mongol Autonomous Prefecture, which borders Kazakhstan. The city covers an area of 7,517 square kilometres (2,902 sq mi) and has a total population of 270,000 as of 2015. The Northern Xinjiang Railway runs through the city, as do highways to Ürümqi.

== Climate ==
Bole has a borderline cool arid climate (Köppen BWk) just short of a cool semi-arid climate (BSk). Like all of Xinjiang, Bole has very warm to hot summers and freezing to frigid winters. Precipitation, again common to all of Xinjiang outside the mountains, is very low and chiefly falls in summer.

Climate data for Bole, Xinjiang, elevation 532 m (1,745 ft), (1991–2020 normals, extremes 1981–2010)
| Month | Jan | Feb | Mar | Apr | May | Jun | Jul | Aug | Sep | Oct | Nov | Dec | Year |
|---|---|---|---|---|---|---|---|---|---|---|---|---|---|
| Record high °C (°F) | 7.6 (45.7) | 6.6 (43.9) | 24.1 (75.4) | 35.8 (96.4) | 37.0 (98.6) | 38.8 (101.8) | 39.0 (102.2) | 39.0 (102.2) | 36.7 (98.1) | 29.4 (84.9) | 18.0 (64.4) | 6.3 (43.3) | 39.0 (102.2) |
| Mean daily maximum °C (°F) | −9.9 (14.2) | −5.1 (22.8) | 6.1 (43.0) | 18.9 (66.0) | 25.5 (77.9) | 30.3 (86.5) | 31.8 (89.2) | 30.1 (86.2) | 24.0 (75.2) | 14.9 (58.8) | 3.5 (38.3) | −6.7 (19.9) | 13.6 (56.5) |
| Daily mean °C (°F) | −15.9 (3.4) | −11.0 (12.2) | 0.6 (33.1) | 12.1 (53.8) | 18.2 (64.8) | 22.8 (73.0) | 24.1 (75.4) | 22.5 (72.5) | 16.6 (61.9) | 8.3 (46.9) | −1.3 (29.7) | −11.4 (11.5) | 7.1 (44.9) |
| Mean daily minimum °C (°F) | −20.5 (−4.9) | −15.9 (3.4) | −3.9 (25.0) | 6.1 (43.0) | 11.7 (53.1) | 16.0 (60.8) | 17.2 (63.0) | 15.6 (60.1) | 10.0 (50.0) | 3.1 (37.6) | −4.8 (23.4) | −15.0 (5.0) | 1.6 (35.0) |
| Record low °C (°F) | −34.2 (−29.6) | −35.0 (−31.0) | −30.4 (−22.7) | −7.4 (18.7) | −1.4 (29.5) | 4.4 (39.9) | 7.8 (46.0) | 2.9 (37.2) | −1.7 (28.9) | −12.0 (10.4) | −28.8 (−19.8) | −33.3 (−27.9) | −35.0 (−31.0) |
| Average precipitation mm (inches) | 4.9 (0.19) | 7.0 (0.28) | 10.1 (0.40) | 21.8 (0.86) | 30.6 (1.20) | 27.1 (1.07) | 31.6 (1.24) | 24.4 (0.96) | 17.0 (0.67) | 15.7 (0.62) | 11.4 (0.45) | 9.3 (0.37) | 210.9 (8.31) |
| Average precipitation days (≥ 0.1 mm) | 7.9 | 6.7 | 5.2 | 5.6 | 7.9 | 8.9 | 10.0 | 8.4 | 5.2 | 4.0 | 5.6 | 11.4 | 86.8 |
| Average snowy days | 14.3 | 13.2 | 6.9 | 0.8 | 0.1 | 0 | 0 | 0 | 0 | 0.5 | 7.7 | 18.3 | 61.8 |
| Average relative humidity (%) | 80 | 79 | 72 | 54 | 48 | 50 | 54 | 55 | 57 | 66 | 78 | 82 | 65 |
| Mean monthly sunshine hours | 138.7 | 145.7 | 178.2 | 244.9 | 297.6 | 292.3 | 306.9 | 300.4 | 258.1 | 193.2 | 109.8 | 99.7 | 2,565.5 |
| Percentage possible sunshine | 48 | 49 | 47 | 60 | 64 | 63 | 66 | 71 | 70 | 58 | 39 | 37 | 56 |
Source: China Meteorological Administration

== Subdivisions ==
Bole is made up of 5 subdistricts, 4 towns and 1 township.

| Name | Simplified Chinese | Hanyu Pinyin | Uyghur (UEY) | Uyghur Latin (ULY) | Mongolian (traditional) | Mongolian (Cyrillic) | Administrative division code |
|---|---|---|---|---|---|---|---|
Subdistricts
| Qindel Subdistrict | 青得里街道 | Qīngdélǐ Jiēdào | چىندېل كوچا باشقارمىسى | chindël kocha bashqarmisi | ᠴᠢᠩᠳᠡᠯ ᠵᠡᠭᠡᠯᠢ ᠭᠤᠳᠤᠮᠵᠢ | Чандал зээл гудамж | 652701001 |
| Golomt Subdistrict | 顾力木图街道 | Gùlìmùtú Jiēdào | گۈلىمتۇ كوچا باشقارمىسى | gülimtu kocha bashqarmisi | ᠭᠥᠯᠢᠮᠲᠦ ᠵᠡᠭᠡᠯᠢ ᠭᠤᠳᠤᠮᠵᠢ | Хлэмт зээл гудамж | 652701002 |
| Nanchengqu Subdistrict | 南城区街道 | Nánchéngqū Jiēdào | جەنۇبىي شەھەر (نەنچېڭ ) رايونى كوچا باشقارمىسى | jenubiy sheher (nenchëng) rayoni kocha bashqarmisi | ᠡᠮᠦᠨ᠎ᠡ ᠬᠣᠲᠠ ᠶᠢᠨ ᠲᠣᠭᠣᠷᠢᠭ ᠤᠨ ᠵᠡᠭᠡᠯᠢ ᠭᠤᠳᠤᠮᠵᠢ | Өмнө хотын дугаргийн зээл гудамж | 652701004 |
| Qindala Subdistrict | 青达拉街道 | Qīngdálā Jiēdào | چىندالا كوچا باشقارمىسى | chindala kocha bashqarmisi | ᠴᠢᠨᠳᠠᠯᠠᠢ ᠵᠡᠭᠡᠯᠢ ᠭᠤᠳᠤᠮᠵᠢ | Чинэтэлий зээл гудамж | 652701005 |
| Kerginjo Subdistrict | 克尔根卓街道 | Kè'ěrgēnzhuō Jiēdào | غۇرىنجۆ كوچا باشقارمىسى | ghurinjö kocha bashqarmisi | ᠬᠥᠭᠥᠷᠭᠡ ᠶᠢᠨ ᠵᠦ᠋ ᠵᠡᠭᠡᠯᠢ ᠭᠤᠳᠤᠮᠵᠢ | Гүүрийн зү зээл гудамж | 652701006 |
Towns
| Xiaoyingpan Town | 小营盘镇 | Xiǎoyíngpán Zhèn | شويىڭپەن بازىرى | shoyingpen baziri | ᠰᠢᠶᠣᠤᠶᠢᠩᠫᠠᠨ ᠪᠠᠯᠭᠠᠰᠤ | Шюурмпан балгас | 652701100 |
| Dalt Town | 达勒特镇 | Dálètè Zhèn | دالتۇ بازىرى | daltu baziri | ᠳᠠᠯᠤᠲᠤ ᠪᠠᠯᠭᠠᠰᠤ | Далд балгас | 652701101 |
| Ut Bulag Town | 乌图布拉格镇 | Wūtúbùlāgé Zhèn | ئۇتبۇلاق بازىرى | Utbulaq baziri | ᠤᠷᠲᠤᠪᠤᠯᠠᠭ ᠪᠠᠯᠭᠠᠰᠤ | Ортобулаг балгас | 652701102 |
| Qindel Town | 青得里镇 | Qīngdélǐ Zhèn | چىندېل بازىرى | chindël baziri | ᠴᠢᠨᠳᠡᠯ ᠪᠠᠯᠭᠠᠰᠤ | Чандал балгас | 652701103 |
Townships
| Belin Harmodon Township | 贝林哈日莫墩乡 | Bèilínhārìmòdūn Xiāng | بىلىن خارمودۇن يېزىسى | bilin xarmodun yëzisi | ᠪᠡᠢᠯᠡ ᠶᠢᠨ ᠬᠠᠷᠠᠮᠣᠳᠣᠨ ᠰᠢᠶᠠᠩ | Бэйлийн харамтон шиян | 652701201 |

Others:

- Aral Tohoi Pasture (阿热勒托海牧场, ئارالتوخا چارۋىچىلىق مەيدانى, ᠠᠷᠠᠯ ᠲᠣᠬᠣᠢ ᠮᠠᠯᠵᠢᠬᠤ ᠲᠠᠯᠠᠪᠠᠢ)
- XPCC 86th Regiment Branch Farm (兵团八十六团分部) (86-تۇەن مەيدانى) (86 ᠳᠤᠭᠠᠷ ᠲᠤᠸᠠᠨ ᠲᠠᠯᠠᠪᠠᠢ)

== Notable people ==
- Nur Bekri
