= Wenquan County =

Wenquan County 温泉县 (Chinese) ئارىشاڭ ناھىيىسى (Uyghur) ᠷᠠᠰᠢᠶᠠᠨ ᠰᠢᠶᠠᠨ (Mongolian) Arixang, Rasiyan
- County
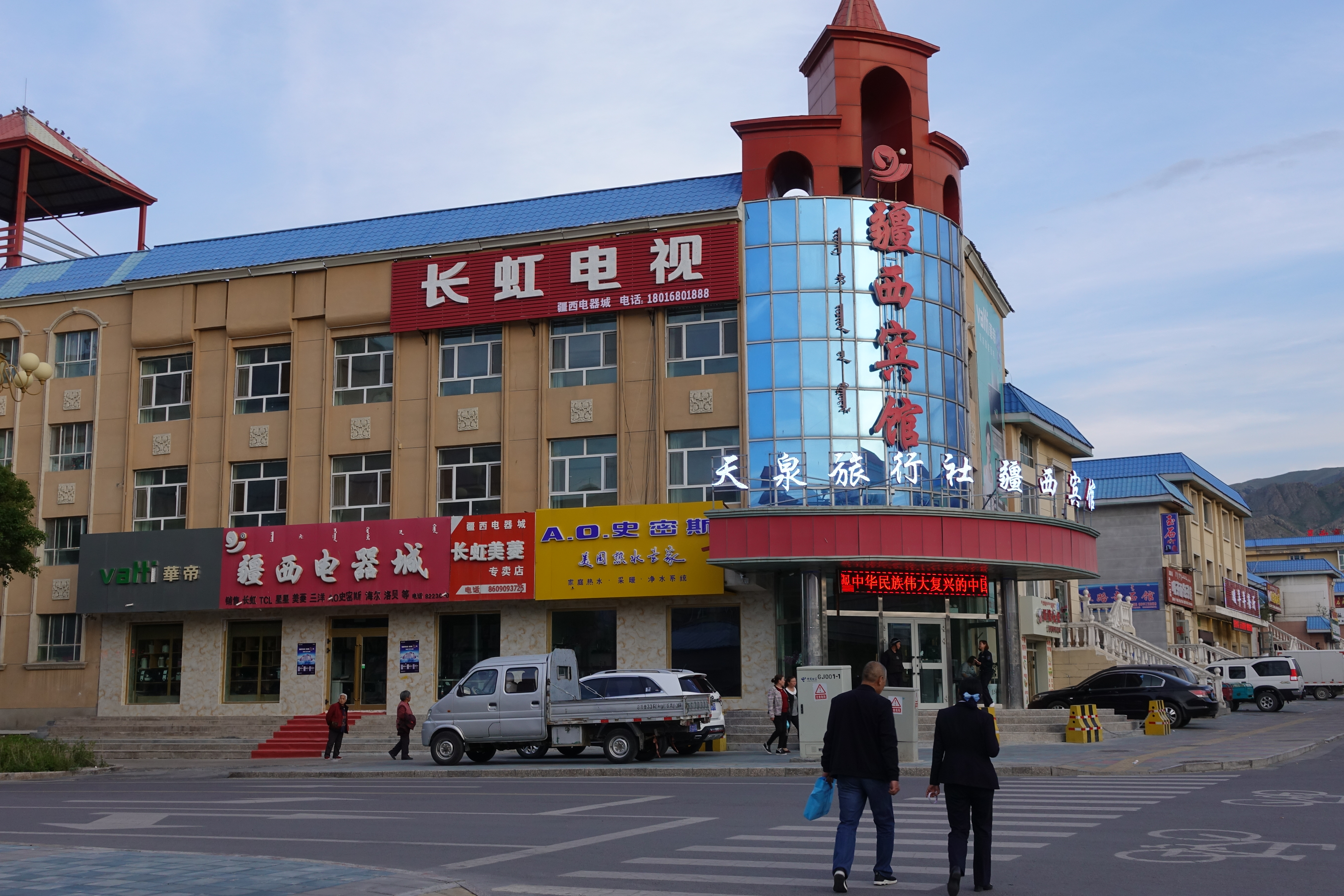

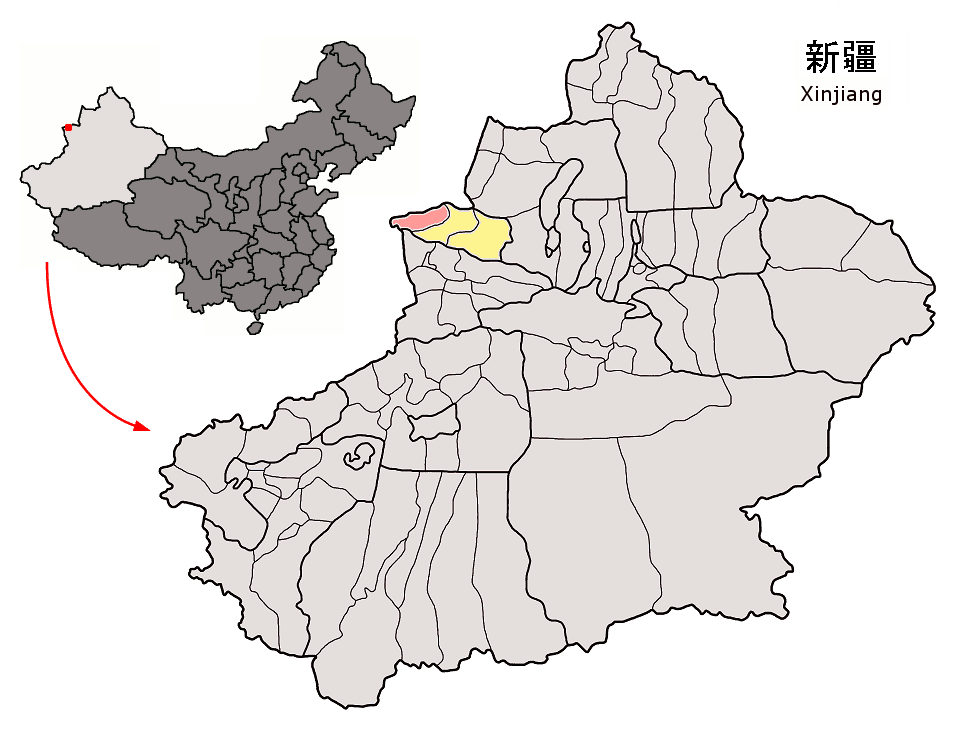
- Wenquan County (red) within Bortala Prefecture (yellow) and Xinjiang

- Location of the seat in Xinjiang Wenquan (Xinjiang) Wenquan (China)
- Coordinates (Wenquan County government): 44°58′08″N 81°01′29″E
- Country: China
- Autonomous region: Xinjiang
- Autonomous prefecture: Bortala
- County seat: Bogdar

Area
  - Total: 5,885.52 km^{2} (2,272.41 sq mi)

Population (2020)
  - Total: 49,696
  - Density: 8.4438/km^{2} (21.869/sq mi)
- Time zone: UTC+8 (China Standard (Note: Locals in Xinjiang frequently observe UTC+6 (Xinjiang Time), 2 hours behind Beijing.))
- Website: www.xjwq.gov.cn

Wenquan County

Chinese name
- Simplified Chinese: 温泉县
- Traditional Chinese: 溫泉縣
- Literal meaning: hot springs
Transcriptions
Standard Mandarin
- Hanyu Pinyin: Wēnquán Xiàn

Alternative Chinese name
- Simplified Chinese: 阿日相县
- Traditional Chinese: 阿日相縣
Transcriptions
Standard Mandarin
- Hanyu Pinyin: Ārìxiāng Xiàn

Mongolian name
- Mongolian Cyrillic: Рашаан шянь
- Mongolian script: ᠷᠠᠰᠢᠶᠠᠨ ᠰᠢᠶᠠᠨ
Transcriptions
- SASM/GNC: Rasiyan siyan

Uyghur name
- Uyghur: ئارىشاڭ ناھىيىسى
Transcriptions
- Latin Yëziqi: Arishang Nahiyisi
- Yengi Yeziⱪ: Arixang Naⱨiyisi
- SASM/GNC: Arixang Nahiyisi
- Siril Yëziqi: Аришаң Наһийиси

Kazakh name
- Kazakh: اراسان اۋدانى Арасан ауданы Arasan audany

Wenquan County as the official romanized name, also transliterated from Mongolian as Arixang County, is a county in the northwest of the Xinjiang Uyghur Autonomous Region and is under the administration of the Börtala Mongol Autonomous Prefecture, bordering Kazakhstan's Almaty Region to the north and west. It contains an area of 5,900 km^{2} (2,300 sq mi). According to the 2020 census, it has a population of 49,696.

== Subdivisions ==
Wenquan County is made up of 3 towns and 3 townships.

| Name | Simplified Chinese | Hanyu Pinyin | Uyghur (UEY) | Uyghur Latin (ULY) | Mongolian (traditional) | Mongolian (Cyrillic) | Administrative division code |
|---|---|---|---|---|---|---|---|
Towns
| Bogdar Town | 博格达尔镇 | Bógédá'ěr Zhèn | بۆگدۆر بازىرى | bögdör baziri | ᠪᠣᠭᠳᠠ᠋ᠠᠷᠤ ᠪᠠᠯᠭᠠᠰᠤ | Богтонор балгас | 652723100 |
| Har Buh Town | 哈日布呼镇 | Hārìbùhū Zhèn | خاربۇخ بازىرى | xarbux baziri | ᠬᠠᠷᠠᠪᠤᠬᠤ ᠪᠠᠯᠭᠠᠰᠤ | Харваху балгас | 652723101 |
| Anggilig Town | 安格里格镇 | Āngélǐgé Zhèn | ئاڭگىلىگ بازىرى | Anggilig baziri | ᠠᠩᠭᠢᠯᠠᠭ ᠪᠠᠯᠭᠠᠰᠤ | Ангилаг балгас | 652723102 |
Townships
| Qagan Tungge Township | 查干屯格乡 | Chágàntúngé Xiāng | چاغانتۈڭگى يېزىسى | chaghantünggi yëzisi | ᠴᠠᠭᠠᠨᠲᠦᠩᠬᠦ ᠰᠢᠶᠠᠩ | Цагаантэнгүү шиян | 652723201 |
| Zalmut Township | 扎勒木特乡 | Zhālèmùtè Xiāng | زالمۇت يېزىسى | zalmut yëzisi | ᠵᠠᠯᠮᠠᠲᠤ ᠰᠢᠶᠠᠩ | Заламт шиян | 652723202 |
| Taxu Township | 塔秀乡 | Tǎxiù Xiāng | تاشۇ يېزىسى | tashu yëzisi | ᠲᠠᠰᠢᠭᠤ ᠰᠢᠶᠠᠩ | Ташуу шиян | 652723203 |

- Hoh Tohoi Breeding Stock Farm (呼和托哈种畜场) (ᠬᠥᠬᠡᠲᠣᠬᠣᠢ ᠡᠭᠦᠯᠳᠡᠷ ᠮᠠᠯ ᠤᠨ ᠲᠠᠯᠠᠪᠠᠢ) (كۆكتوخا نەسىللىك چارۋا فېرمىسى)
- Hondlon Pasture (昆得仑牧场) (ᠬᠥᠨᠳᠡᠯᠡᠨ ᠮᠠᠯᠵᠢᠬᠤ ᠲᠠᠯᠠᠪᠠᠢ) (كۆندېلېن چارۋىچىلىق مەيدانى)
- XPCC 87th Regiment (兵团八十七团) (87 ᠳᠤᠭᠠᠷ ᠲᠤᠸᠠᠨ ᠲᠠᠯᠠᠪᠠᠢ) (87-تۇەن مەيدانى)
- XPCC 88th Regiment (兵团八十八团) (88 ᠳᠤᠭᠠᠷ ᠲᠤᠸᠠᠨ ᠲᠠᠯᠠᠪᠠᠢ) (88-تۇەن مەيدانى)

== Climate ==
Climate data for Wenquan, elevation 1,358 m (4,455 ft), (1991–2020 normals, extremes 1991–present)
| Month | Jan | Feb | Mar | Apr | May | Jun | Jul | Aug | Sep | Oct | Nov | Dec | Year |
|---|---|---|---|---|---|---|---|---|---|---|---|---|---|
| Record high °C (°F) | 8.0 (46.4) | 13.1 (55.6) | 23.0 (73.4) | 30.0 (86.0) | 31.4 (88.5) | 31.8 (89.2) | 36.1 (97.0) | 35.6 (96.1) | 32.9 (91.2) | 25.5 (77.9) | 18.3 (64.9) | 11.8 (53.2) | 36.1 (97.0) |
| Mean daily maximum °C (°F) | −6.1 (21.0) | −3.6 (25.5) | 2.7 (36.9) | 13.6 (56.5) | 19.7 (67.5) | 24.1 (75.4) | 25.9 (78.6) | 24.7 (76.5) | 18.9 (66.0) | 10.6 (51.1) | 1.9 (35.4) | −4.3 (24.3) | 10.7 (51.2) |
| Daily mean °C (°F) | −13.4 (7.9) | −10.4 (13.3) | −2.5 (27.5) | 7.5 (45.5) | 13.2 (55.8) | 17.7 (63.9) | 19.4 (66.9) | 18.1 (64.6) | 12.6 (54.7) | 4.9 (40.8) | −3.6 (25.5) | −11.0 (12.2) | 4.4 (39.9) |
| Mean daily minimum °C (°F) | −18.1 (−0.6) | −15.3 (4.5) | −6.9 (19.6) | 2.3 (36.1) | 7.6 (45.7) | 12.0 (53.6) | 13.6 (56.5) | 12.2 (54.0) | 7.0 (44.6) | 0.3 (32.5) | −7.4 (18.7) | −15.2 (4.6) | −0.7 (30.8) |
| Record low °C (°F) | −32.1 (−25.8) | −31.1 (−24.0) | −23.4 (−10.1) | −17.3 (0.9) | −3.4 (25.9) | 1.0 (33.8) | 4.5 (40.1) | 2.0 (35.6) | −3.3 (26.1) | −11.9 (10.6) | −24.4 (−11.9) | −30.6 (−23.1) | −32.1 (−25.8) |
| Average precipitation mm (inches) | 4.5 (0.18) | 6.7 (0.26) | 11.5 (0.45) | 25.9 (1.02) | 36.8 (1.45) | 41.6 (1.64) | 52.0 (2.05) | 35.9 (1.41) | 23.3 (0.92) | 15.6 (0.61) | 8.3 (0.33) | 8.7 (0.34) | 270.8 (10.66) |
| Average precipitation days (≥ 0.1 mm) | 5.6 | 6.1 | 8.4 | 8.8 | 9.9 | 12.5 | 14.3 | 11.3 | 7.1 | 5.7 | 6.6 | 7.2 | 103.5 |
| Average snowy days | 11.2 | 12.0 | 12.9 | 3.2 | 0.4 | 0 | 0 | 0 | 0.2 | 3.7 | 10.3 | 13.6 | 67.5 |
| Average relative humidity (%) | 70 | 71 | 73 | 59 | 53 | 53 | 54 | 55 | 58 | 66 | 73 | 73 | 63 |
| Mean monthly sunshine hours | 175.4 | 184.7 | 193.4 | 231.5 | 291.2 | 282.1 | 302.0 | 292.9 | 245.6 | 201.9 | 145.1 | 144.5 | 2,690.3 |
| Percentage possible sunshine | 61 | 61 | 51 | 56 | 63 | 61 | 65 | 69 | 67 | 61 | 52 | 53 | 60 |
Source: China Meteorological Administration
