= List of universities and colleges in Xinjiang =

The following is a list of universities in Xinjiang Uighur Autonomous Region, China, by cities:

Name	Chinese name	Uyghur name	Uyghur name （Latin)	Type	Location
Xinjiang University	新疆大学	شىنجاڭ ئۇنىۋېرسىتېتى	Shinjang Uniwërsitëti	Provincial	Ürümqi
Tarim University	塔里木大学	تارىم ئۇنىۋېرسىتېتى	Tarim Uniwërsitëti	Provincial	Aral
Xinjiang Agricultural University	新疆农业大学	شىنجاڭ يېزائېگىلىك ئۇنىۋېرسىتېتى	Shinjang Yëza'ëgilik Uniwërsitëti	Provincial	Ürümqi
Shihezi University	石河子大学	شىخەنزە ئۇنىۋېرسىتېتى	Shixenze Uniwërsitëti	Provincial	Shihezi
Xinjiang Medical University	新疆医科大学	شىنجاڭ تىببى ئۇنىۋېرسىتېتى	Shinjang Tibbi Uniwërsitëti	Provincial	Ürümqi
Xinjiang Normal University	新疆师范大学	شىنجاڭ پىداگوگېكا ئۇنىۋېرسىتېتى	Shinjang Pidagogëka Uniwërsitëti	Provincial	Ürümqi
Kashgar University	喀什大学	قەشقەر ئۇنىۋېرسىتېتى	Qeshqer Uniwërsitëti	Provincial	Kashgar
Yili Normal University	伊犁师范学院	ئىلى پىداگوگېكا ئىنىستىتۇتى	Ili Pidagogëka Uniwërsitëti	Provincial	Ghulja
Xinjiang University of Finance and Economics	新疆财经大学	شىنجاڭ مالىيە-ئىقتىساد ئۇنىۋېرسىتېتى	Shinjang Maliye-Iqtisad Uniwërsitëti	Provincial	Ürümqi
Xinjiang Arts Institute	新疆艺术学院	شىنجاڭ سەنئەت ئىنىستىتۇتى	Shinjang Sen'et Instituti	Provincial	Ürümqi
Xinjiang Institute of Engineering	新疆工程学院	شىنجاڭ سانائەت قۇرۇلۇش ئ‍ىنىستىتۇتى	Shinjang Sana'et Qurulush Instituti	Provincial	Ürümqi
Changji University	昌吉学院	سانجى ئىنىستىتۇتى	Sanji Instituti	Provincial	Changji
