= Sayram Lake =

Lake in Xinjiang, China

- 赛里木湖 (Chinese); Сайрам көлі (Kazakh)
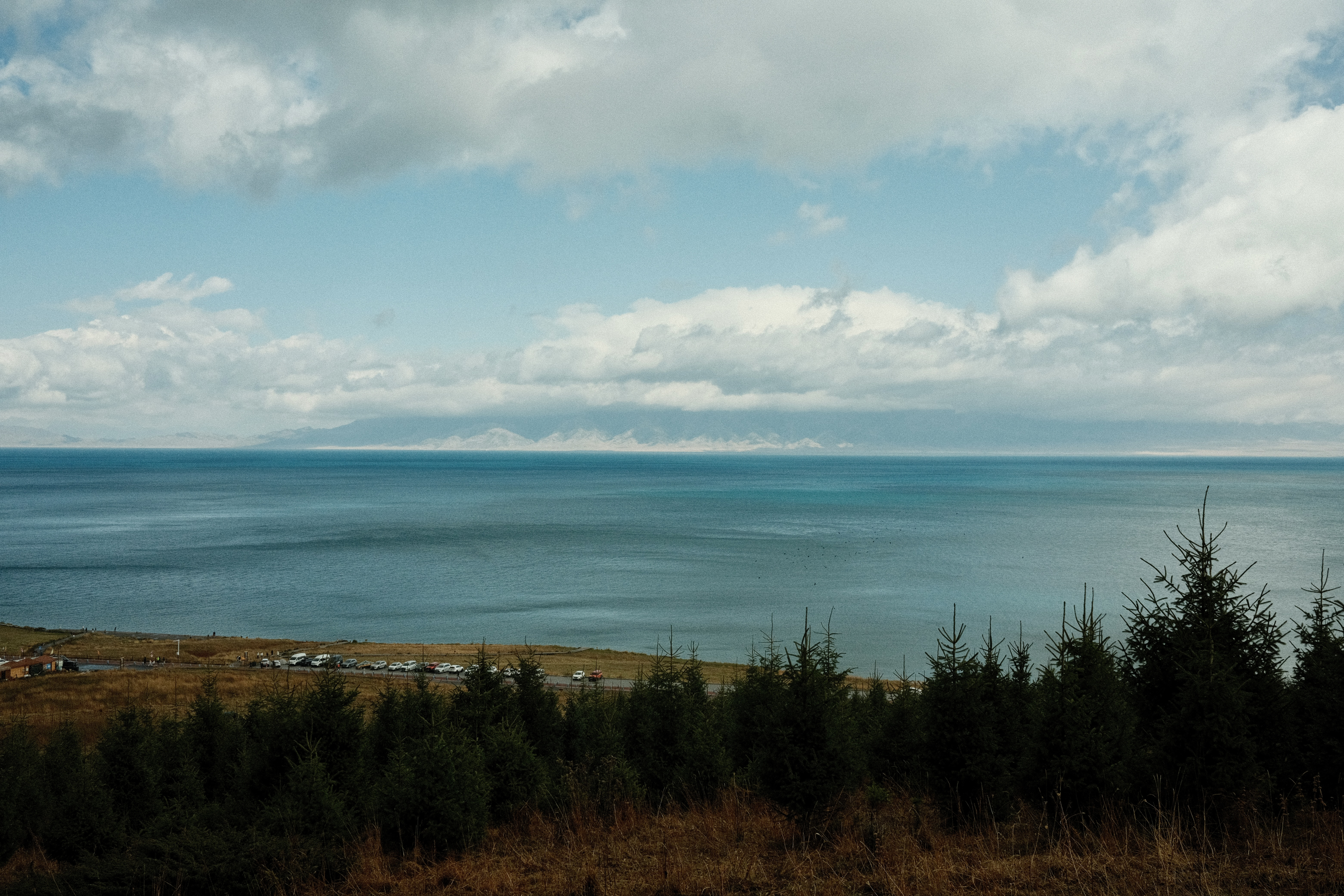

- Location within Dzungaria
- Location: Bortala Prefecture, Xinjiang
- Coordinates: 44.6°N 81.2°E
- Basin countries: China
- Surface area: 458 km^{2} (177 sq mi)
- Surface elevation: 2,070 m (6,791 ft)

Sairam Lake (Chinese: 赛里木湖; pinyin: Sàilǐmù hú; Uyghur: سايرام كۆلى; Kazakh: Сайрам көлі, romanized: Sairam köli; Mongolian: Сайрам нуур, romanized: Sairam nuur), also known as Santai Haizi (Chinese: 三台海子) or historically the "Clean Sea" (净海), is an endorheic freshwater lake in the northern Tianshan Mountains at Börtala Mongol Autonomous Prefecture, Xinjiang, China, less than 50 km (31 mi) from the border with Kazakhstan. The name Sayram originally derives from Kazakh, meaning "blessing".

The lake is the largest (458 km^{2} or 177 sq mi) and also the highest (at 2,070 m or 6,790 ft) alpine lake in Xinjiang, largely filled by glacial meltwater, residual precipitation from the Eurasian westerlies and runoffs from the surrounding mountain chains, as well as some groundwater springing and seepage. It was designated an AAAA National Scenic Area in 2010 and was upgraded to an AAAAA National Scenic Area in April 2021.

== History ==
Sayram Lake is located along the northern branch of the historic Northern Silk Road. The mountainous region it belongs had been largely uninhabited throughout history, but the valleys east of it was historically settled by Saka nomads and various Tocharian people such as Jushi and Wusun, and later by the Göktürks and Oirat (Dzungar) Mongols. Around the lake, there are also archaeological sites of various ancient rock arts, tombs and ruins of temples, ovoo, steles and stage stations from different dynasties.

Late Southern Song Taoist monk Qiu Chuji recorded in his famous travel journal that the lake as "spanning 200 li and surrounded by snowing summits", calling it a "heavenly pool". Other famous visitors such as Mongol Empire politician Yelü Chucai and Qing dynasty viceroy Lin Zexu (who was exiled to Xinjiang after the First Opium War) also recorded descriptions of the lake.

A local folktale relates that the lake was formed by a young Kazakh couple who had been separated by a demon, and were forced to jump into an abyss to be reunited. Their tears filled the abyss, forming the lake.

== Biology ==
Sayram Lake is one of the most biodiverse region in Northwest China. Human activities are limited around the lake, and the unique wetland ecosystems around the lake exert significant importance to the hydrology and climate of northern Xinjiang.

=== Flora ===
The Sayram Lake region is home to 58 families, 288 genera and 639 species of seed plants, including three families and 8 species of gymnosperms and the remainder all being angiosperms. The usable land around the lake is predominantly steppes, although there have been large areas of grassland degradation since the 1980s.

=== Fauna ===
The native wildlife around Sayram Lake are steppe/desert fauna such as corsac fox and bobak marmot, and wetland waterbirds such as mallard and whooper swan. Originating from glacial cirques, there were originally no fish species in the lake. Stocking programs for coldwater fishes had taken place since 1976, though with poor results. Since the 1990s, 16 fish species, including salmonids such as peled and arctic cisco and cyprinids like ide, have been successfully introduced and naturalized into the lake. The lake is currently one of the most famous bases of coldwater aquaculture in China, with a dozen species being sold on the market.

== Tourism ==
Sayram Lake is one of Xinjiang's major tourist destinations. It was designated a National Key Scenic Area in 2004. In 2005, a 79-kilometre ring road around the lake was completed, and the Sayram Lake Scenic Area Administration Committee was established to oversee management. In 2007, the site was approved as a National Wetland Park of China, and the same year saw the launch of an annual cycling race around the lake. It was designated an AAAA National Scenic Area in 2010, and in April 2021 was upgraded to an AAAAA National Scenic Area.

The development of the Sayram Lake tourist zone has expanded rapidly. In 2018, the scenic area began upgrading its facilities, expanding the original 2,200 m^{2} (24,000 sq ft) visitor service centre to about 6,500 m^{2} (70,000 sq ft) and adding new gates, parking areas, signage, and a restaurant and shopping complex. Construction of a new, larger visitor centre began in 2023, featuring a 15,000 m^{2} (160,000 sq ft) main building and 50,000 m^{2} (540,000 sq ft) of parking. The facility officially opened in January 2025, offering expanded retail, dining, and transport amenities, and hosting several fast-food outlets such as McDonald's, KFC, Burger King and Pizza Hut. As of 2025, the area continues to grow, with construction of the JW Marriott Hotel complex to the east of the scenic area. The complex covers about 118,000 m^{2} (1,270,000 sq ft), has a planned gross floor area of about 101,000 m^{2} (1,090,000 sq ft), includes 701 guest rooms, and represents a total investment of 2.9 billion yuan. It will feature three international brands: JW Marriott, Le Méridien, and Moxy, as part of a wider regional tourism initiative.
