= Bortala Mongol Autonomous Prefecture =

Autonomous prefecture in Xinjiang, China

- Autonomous prefecture

Name transcription(s)
  - Chinese: 博尔塔拉蒙古自治州
  - Uyghur: بۆرتالا موڭغۇل ئاپتونوم ئوبلاستى
  - Mongolian: ᠪᠣᠷᠣᠲᠠᠯ᠎ᠠ ᠮᠣᠩᠭᠣᠯ ᠥᠪᠡᠷᠲᠡᠭᠡᠨ ᠵᠠᠰᠠᠬᠤ ᠵᠧᠦ
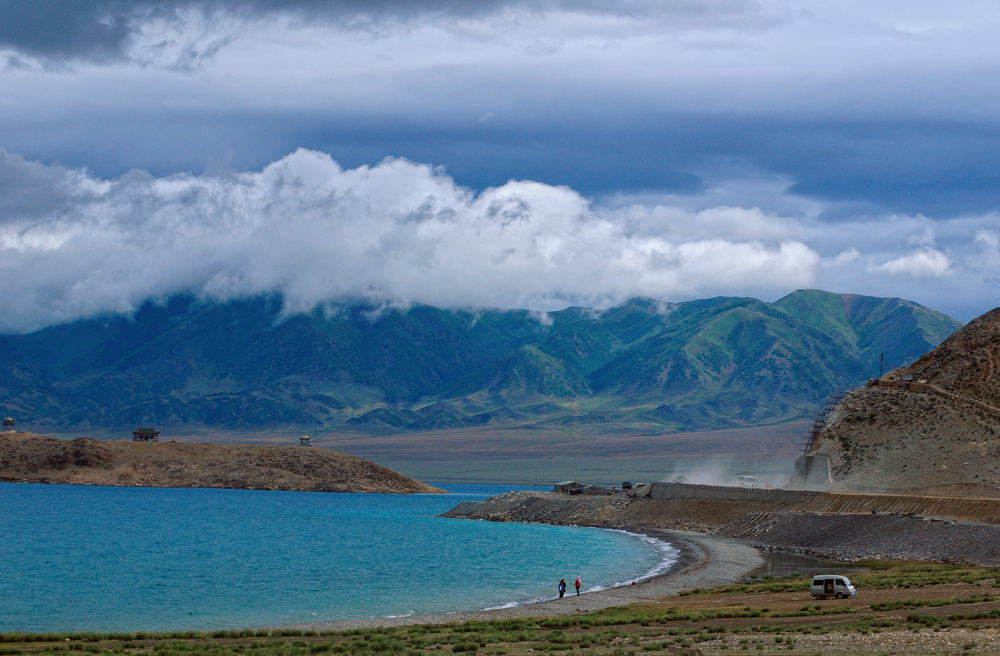
- Sayram Lake

- Bortala Mongol Prefecture (red) in Xinjiang (orange)
- Coordinates: 44°54′22″N 82°03′59″E
- Country: People's Republic of China
- Autonomous region: Xinjiang
- Prefectural seat: Bole

Area
  - Autonomous prefecture: 27,000 km^{2} (10,000 sq mi)

Population (2019)
  - Autonomous prefecture: 475,483
  - Density: 18/km^{2} (46/sq mi)
  - Urban: 211,235

GDP
  - Autonomous prefecture: CN¥ 35.4 billion US$ 5.1 billion
  - Per capita: CN¥ 74,275; US$ 10,749
- Time zone: UTC+8 (China Standard)
- ISO 3166 code: CN-XJ-27
- Website: www.xjboz.gov.cn

Bortala Mongol Autonomous Prefecture

Chinese name
- Simplified Chinese: 博尔塔拉蒙古自治州
- Traditional Chinese: 博爾塔拉蒙古自治州
Transcriptions
Standard Mandarin
- Hanyu Pinyin: Bó'ěrtǎlā Měnggǔ Zìzhìzhōu
- Wade–Giles: Po^{2}-êrh^{3}-tʻa^{3}-la^{1} Mêng^{3}-ku^{3} Tzŭ^{4}-chih^{4}-chou^{1}

Mongolian name
- Mongolian Cyrillic: Борталын монгол үндэстний өөртөө засах жуу
- Mongolian script: ᠪᠣᠷᠣᠲᠠᠯ᠎ᠠ ᠮᠣᠩᠭᠣᠯ ᠥᠪᠡᠷᠲᠡᠭᠡᠨ ᠵᠠᠰᠠᠬᠤ ᠵᠧᠦ
Transcriptions
- SASM/GNC: Borotal-a-yin moŋɣol öbertegen jasaqu jėü

Uyghur name
- Uyghur: بۆرتالا موڭغۇل ئاپتونوم ئوبلاستى
Transcriptions
- Latin Yëziqi: Börtala Mongghul Aptonom Oblasti
- Yengi Yeziⱪ: Bɵrtala Mongƣul Aptonom Oblasti
- SASM/GNC: Börtala Mongĝul Aptonom Oblasti
- Siril Yëziqi: Бөртала Моңғул Аптоном Области

Oirat name
- Oirat: ᡋᡆᠷᡆᡐᠠᠯᠠ ᡏᡆᡊᡎᡆᠯ ᡄᡋᡄᠷᡄᡃᠨ ᠴᠠᠰᠠᡍᡇ ᡓᡇᡇ; Borotala mongγol ebereen zasaqu ǰuu

Bortala Mongol Autonomous Prefecture (Note: Chinese: 博尔塔拉蒙古族自治州; pinyin: Bó'ěrtǎlā Měnggǔzú Zìzhìzhōu; abbreviated 博尔塔拉州 or 博州; Uyghur: بۆرتالا موڭغۇل ئاپتونوم ئوبلاستى, romanized: Börtala Mongghul Aptonom Oblasti; Mongolian: ᠪᠣᠷᠣᠲᠠᠯ᠎ᠠᠮᠣᠩᠭᠣᠯᠥᠪᠡᠷᠲᠡᠭᠡᠨᠵᠠᠰᠠᠬᠤ ᠵᠧᠦ) is an autonomous prefecture in the northern Xinjiang, China. Its capital is Bole, also known as Bortala. It has a population of 475,483 inhabiting an area of 27,000 km^{2} (10,000 sq mi). Despite being designated an autonomous area for Mongols in China, only a little over five and a half per cent of Bortala's population is Mongol.

== Etymology ==
"Bortala" comes from the Mongolian words boro tala, which mean "brown steppe".

== Geography ==
Bortala is located in the southwestern part of the Dzungarian Basin. It occupies a V-shaped basin between the Dzungarian Alatau in the northwest and the Borohoro Mountains in the southwest.

The prefecture borders Kazakhstan to the north and west, and has an international border of 385 km (239 mi). To the east it borders Wusu City and Toli County of Tacheng Prefecture; to the south it borders Nilka County, Yining County, and Huocheng County of Ili Kazakh Autonomous Prefecture.

The prefecture has two large lakes, Ebi-Nur and Sayram Lake.

== Administrative divisions ==
Bortala is divided into two county-level cities, Bole and Alashankou; and two counties: Jinghe County and Wenquan County. In addition, it is home to the Fifth Agricultural Division of the Xinjiang Production and Construction Corps and its 11 regiment-level farms / ranches.

Map
Name	Hanzi	Hanyu Pinyin	Uyghur (UEY)	Uyghur Latin (ULY)	Mongolian	Population (2010 Census)	Area (km^{2})	Density (/km^{2})
Bole	博乐市	Bólè Shì	بۆرتالا شەھىرى	Börtala Shehiri	ᠪᠣᠷᠢᠲᠠᠯ᠎ᠠ ᠬᠣᠲᠠ	235,585	7,802	30.19
Alashankou	阿拉山口市	Ālāshānkǒu Shì	ئالاتاۋ ئېغىزى	Alataw Shehiri	ᠠᠯᠠᠭ ᠠᠭᠤᠯᠠ ᠬᠣᠲᠠ	10,000(?)	43	232.55
Jinghe County	精河县	Jīnghé Xiàn	جىڭ ناھىيىسى	Jing Nahiyisi	ᠵᠢᠩ ᠾᠧ ᠰᠢᠶᠠᠨ	141,593	11,189	12.65
Wenquan County	温泉县	Wēnquán Xiàn	ئارىشاڭ ناھىيىسى	Arishang Nahiyisi	ᠷᠠᠰᠢᠶᠠᠨ ᠰᠢᠶᠠᠨ	66,502	5,862	11.34

== History ==
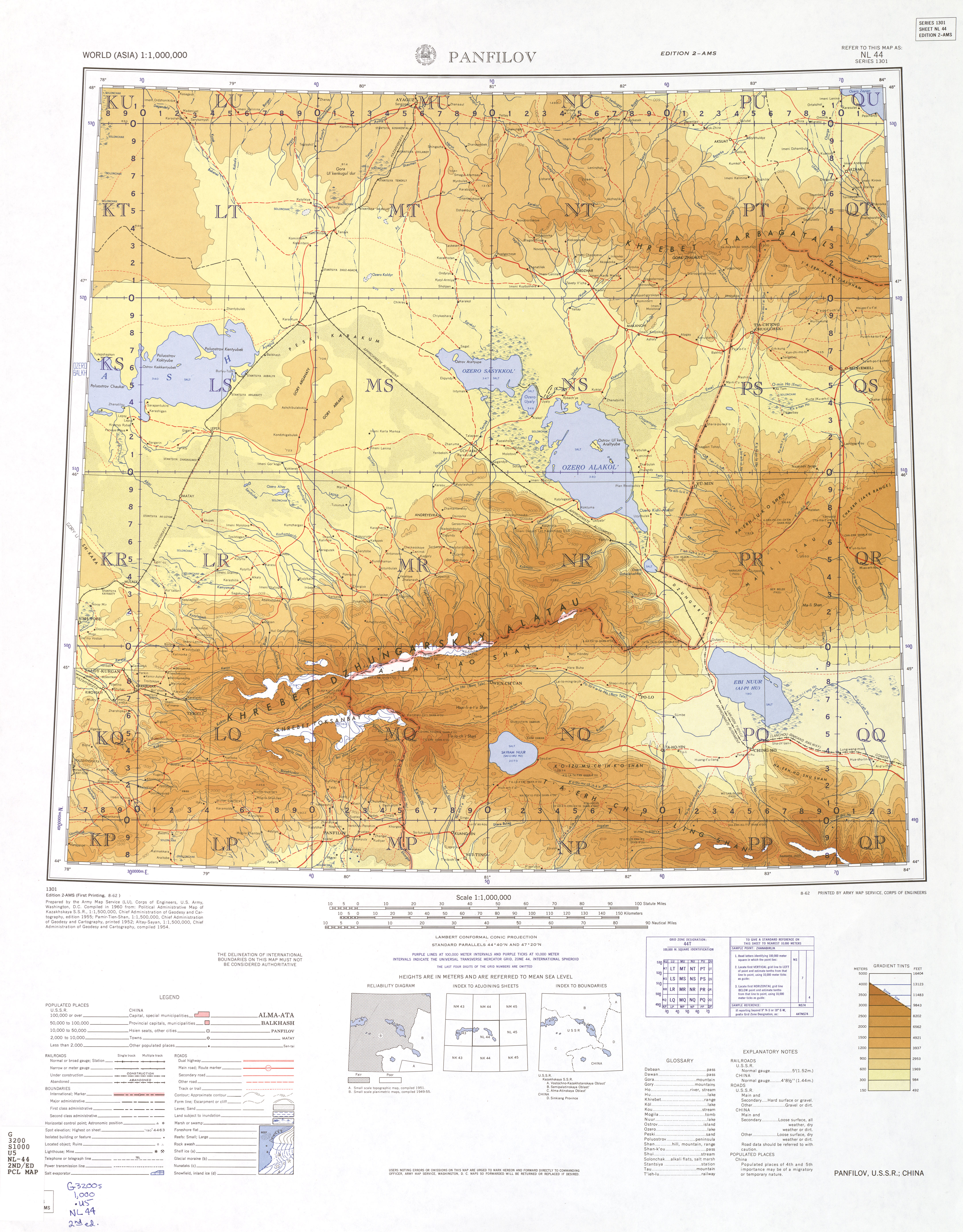
Map of the area in the International Map of the World (1960)

The Tang dynasty created the Shuanghe Protectorate in this area. During the Yuan and Ming dynasties, the area was the territory of the Oirats. Chahar Mongols were moved here during the Qing dynasty from Kalgan, while Torghuud Oirats moved eastwards from the Volga.

The People's Republic of China established the autonomous prefecture on July 13, 1954.

== Demographics ==
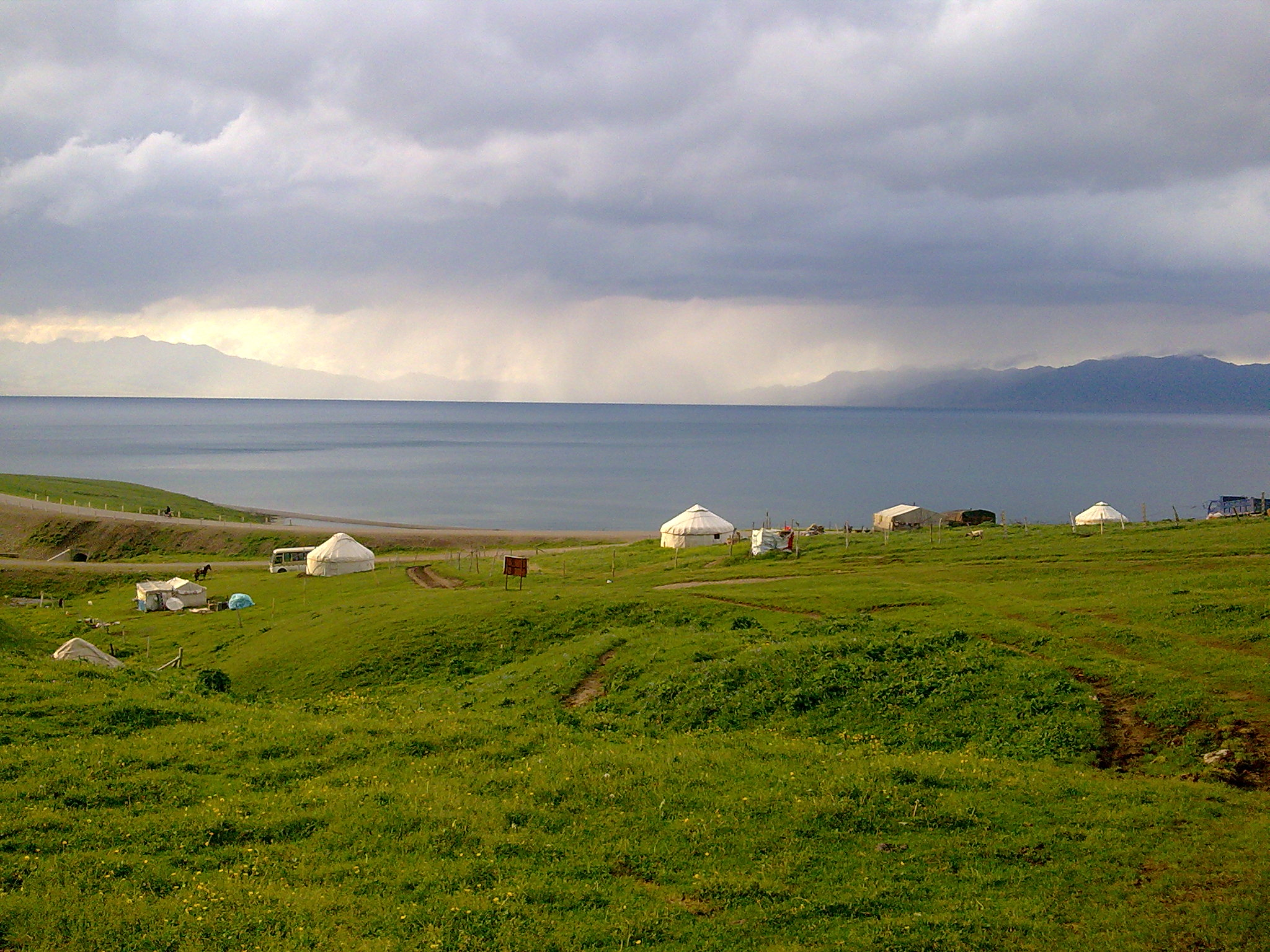
Yurts by Sayram Lake

There are 35 nationalities in Bortala. According to the 2010 census, 65% of the 443,680 inhabitants are Han Chinese, while the remainder are Mongol, Uyghur, Kazakh, Hui or of other nationalities.

Population by ethnicity as of 2000 and 2010.

Ethnicity	Population 2000	%	Population 2010	%
Han	284,915	67.18%	288,220	64.96%
Uyghur	53,145	12.53%	59,106	13.32%
Kazakhs	38,744	9.13%	44,417	10.01%
Mongol	23,927	5.64%	25,125	5.66%
Hui	19,053	4.49%	23,180	5.22%
Dongxiang	1,587	0.37%	1,455	0.33%
Zhuang			345	0.08%
Xibe			273	0.06%
Tibetan			271	0.06%
Tujia			267	0.06%
Manchu			193	0.04%
Russian			114	0.03%
Uzbek			90	0.02%
Kyrgyz			74	0.02%
Others	2,669		550	0.12%
Total	424,100	100%	443,680	100%

== Economy ==
In 2004 the prefecture had a total gross domestic product of 3.69 billion Renminbi (including the XPCC 5th division), an increase of 11.9% over the previous year. Annual total imports and exports totalled US$ 554 million, an increase of 96.8% over the previous year. Average annual salary was 11000 Renminbi, an increase of 7.6%; average annual pure income per capita for agricultural workers was 3904 Renminbi, an increase of 10.8%.

== Transport ==
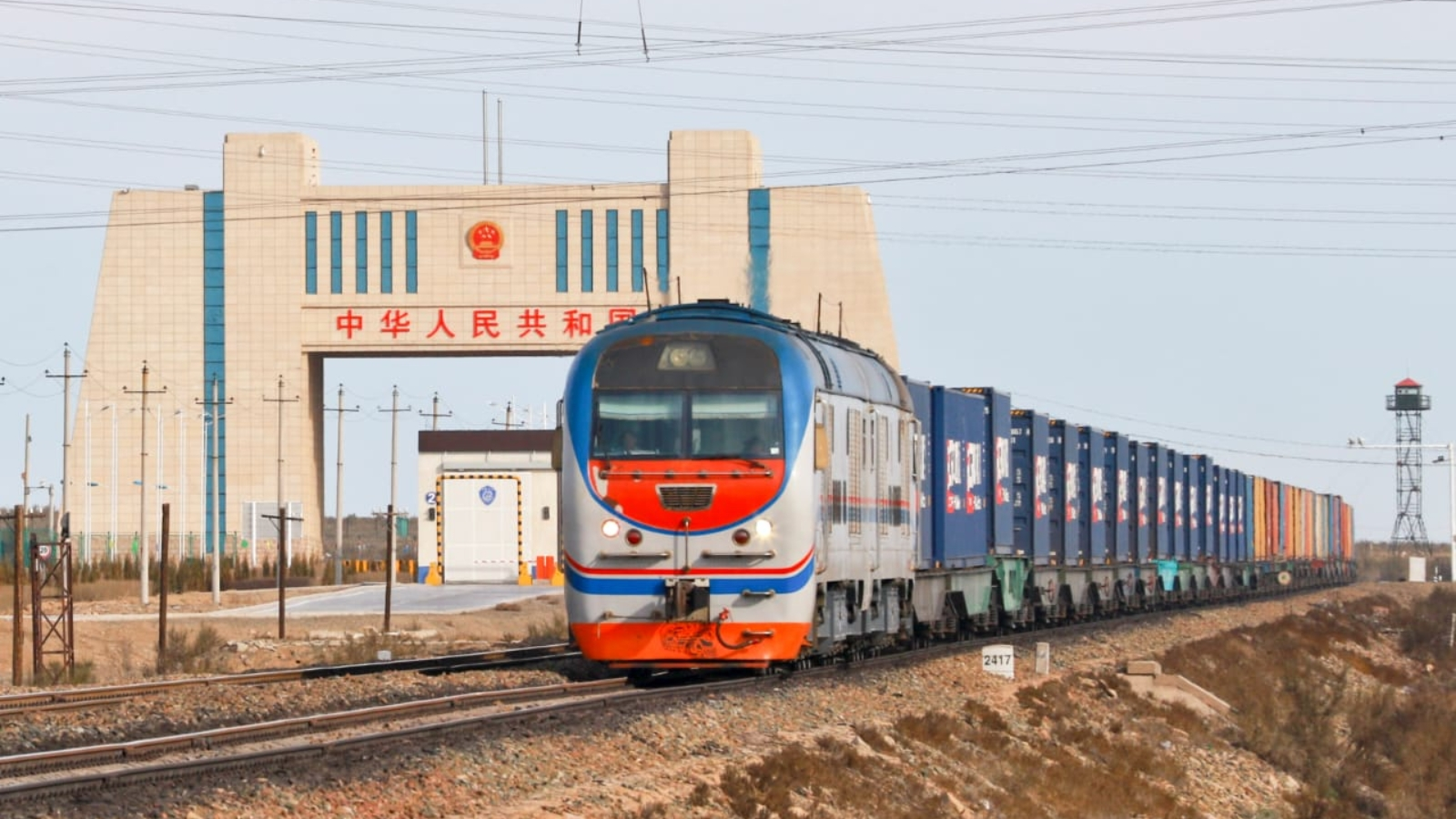
Freight train arriving at Alashankou railway station

Alashankou is a port of entry with both railroads and roads linking China with Kazakhstan; it is also one of China's national first-class port of entry (国家一类口岸). The volume of imports / exports passing through Alashankou accounts for 90% of the total for all of Xinjiang, and has been second to only Manzhouli, Inner Mongolia among land ports-of-entry in China for 8 days.
