= Xinjiang University of Finance and Economics =

University in Ürümqi, Xinjiang Uyghur Autonomous Region, China

Xinjiang University of Finance and Economics 新疆财经大学
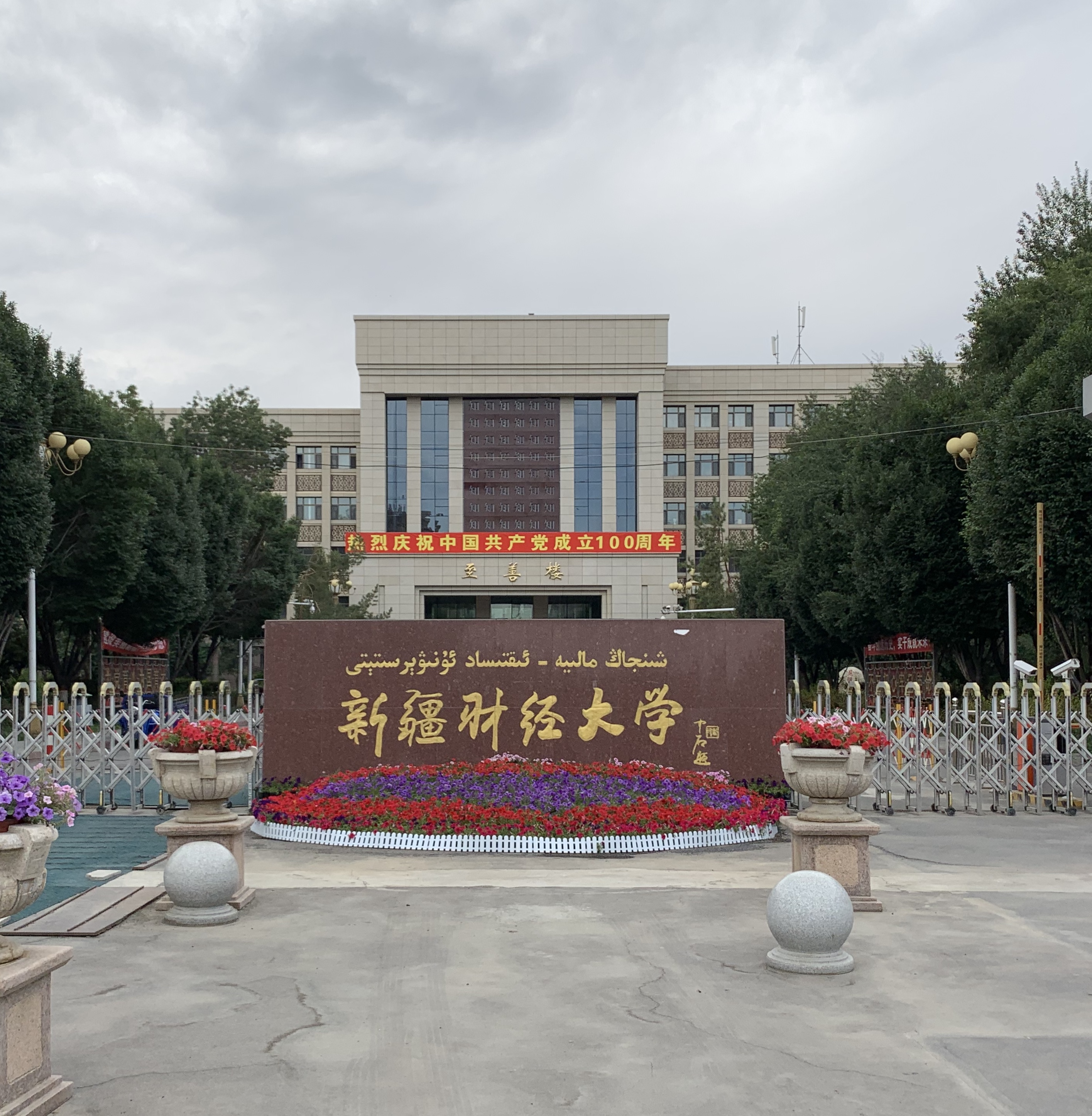
- Main Gate of XUFE
- Type: Public
- Established: 1950; 76 years ago
- Academic staff: 1,302
- Undergraduates: 20,000
- Postgraduates: 2,039
- Location: Ürümqi, Xinjiang, China
- Campus: Urban

Xinjiang University of Finance and Economics (Chinese: 新疆财经大学; pinyin: Xīnjiāng Cáijīng Dàxué), abbreviated as XJUFE, is situated in Urumqi, Xinjiang Uygur Autonomous Region. It is a prominent university in Xinjiang and an institution that confers doctoral degrees.

== History ==
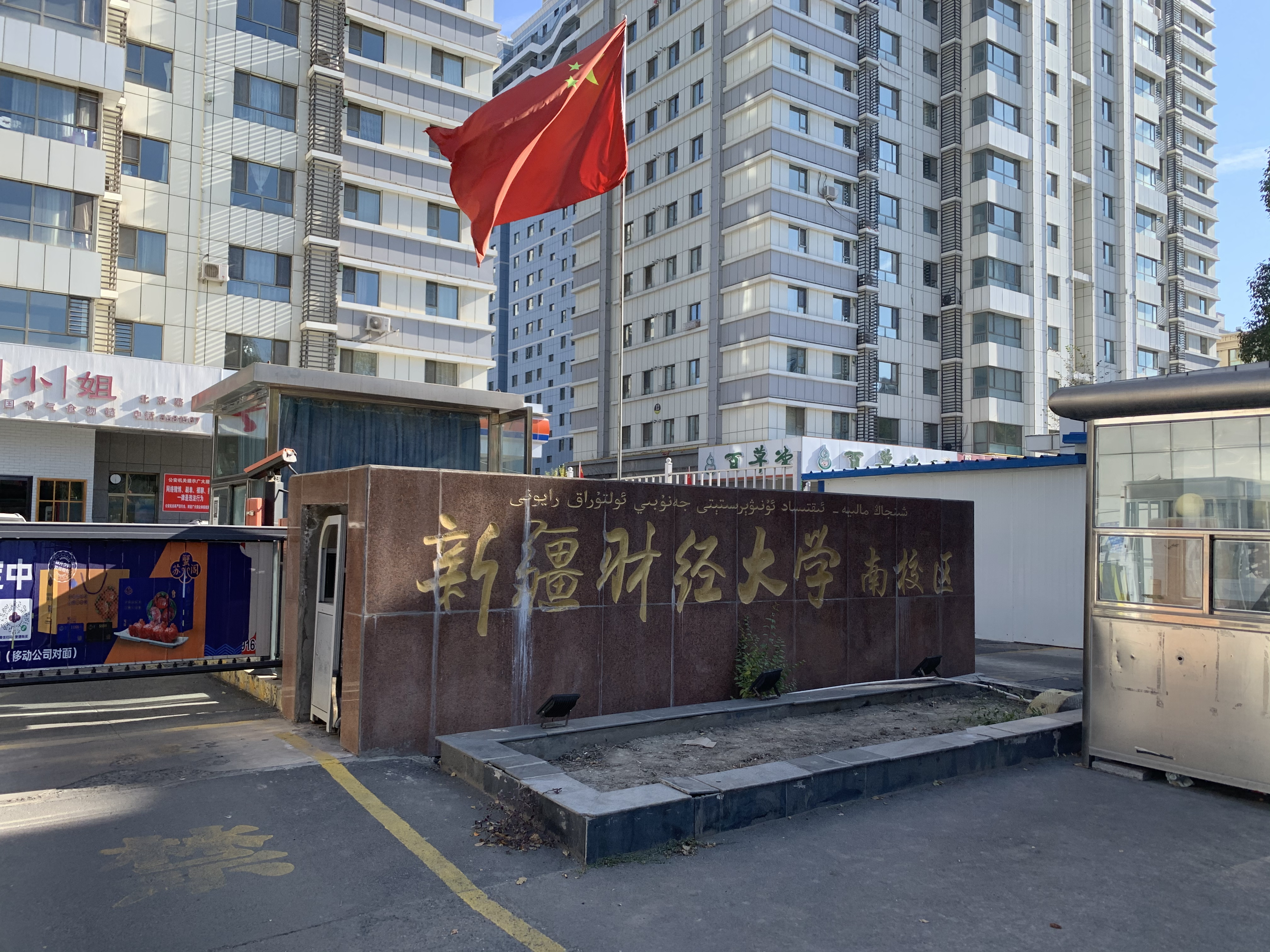
South Gate of Xinjiang University of Finance and Economics

In 1950, the Xinjiang Provincial People's Government Cadre Training Course was established. In 1959, it was elevated to Xinjiang Finance and Economics College. In 1962, it was converted into Xinjiang Finance and Trade School. In 1980, the State Council authorized the re-establishment of Xinjiang Finance and Economics College. In 1998, it was granted the authority to confer master's degrees.

In 2000, Xinjiang College of Finance and Economics amalgamated with Xinjiang College of Economic Management Cadres and Xinjiang School of Finance and Taxation to establish the new Xinjiang College of Finance and Economics. It was the inaugural institution to be authorized to offer an MBA program in Xinjiang in 2001 and was rebranded as Xinjiang University of Finance and Economics with the endorsement of the Ministry of Education in 2007.

In 2012, it received approval as the China (Xinjiang)-Central Asia Economic and Trade Cooperation Service National Special Demand Doctoral Talent Training Program. In 2018, it received approval as a PhD degree-granting entity. In September 2021, it was designated as one of the second cohort of national language and script promotion bases to be included in the list of selected units.

In May 2022, the university commenced the formation of the Xinjiang New Liberal Arts Education Alliance (Chinese: 新疆新文科教育联盟) and assumed the role of chairman of the governing entity.

== Academics ==
The institute comprises 14 academic departments, namely banking, finance, accounting, business administration, statistics, information management, economics, marketing, law, computer science, foreign languages, preparatory studies, Chinese language, Marxism–Leninism, physical education, and one affiliated school for adult education. Among all the departments, finance, accounting and business administration have been chosen as Xinjiang's key provincial disciplines.

== See also ==
- List of universities in Xinjiang
- Xinjiang
- Urumqi
