= Xinjiang Medical University =

Medical school in Ürümqi, Xinjiang Uyghur Autonomous Region, China

- 新疆医科大学
- Motto: Assiduous, Diligent, Devoted, Creative
- Type: Public
- Established: 1956; 70 years ago
- President: Haji Akber Aisa
- Faculty: 1,485
- Undergraduates: 21,682
- Postgraduates: 5,117
- Location: Ürümqi, Xinjiang, China
- Campus: Urban, 1954.6 acres
- Website: www.xjmu.edu.cn

Xinjiang Medical University (Chinese: 新疆医科大学; pinyin: Xīnjiāng Yīkē Dàxué; Uyghur: شىنجاڭ تىببىي ئۇنىۋېرسىتېت, romanized: Shinjang Tibbiy Universiteti), formerly the Xinjiang Medical College, is a medical university in Ürümqi, the capital of the Xinjiang Uyghur Autonomous Region of the People's Republic of China. It was ratified by the National Ministry of Education in 1998 and entitled by Jiang Zemin.

The curriculum places a particular emphasis on medicine, management and linguistics, with the university facilitating 25 specialties for undergraduate students and 17 specialties for academic education. Over 50,000 students have been educated at the university. In 2010, 13,100 students were enrolled at the university, with 5,405 people employed in teaching positions.

The university is at the base of Carp Hill in Northeast Ürümqi and consists of a campus that is over 3 million square feet.

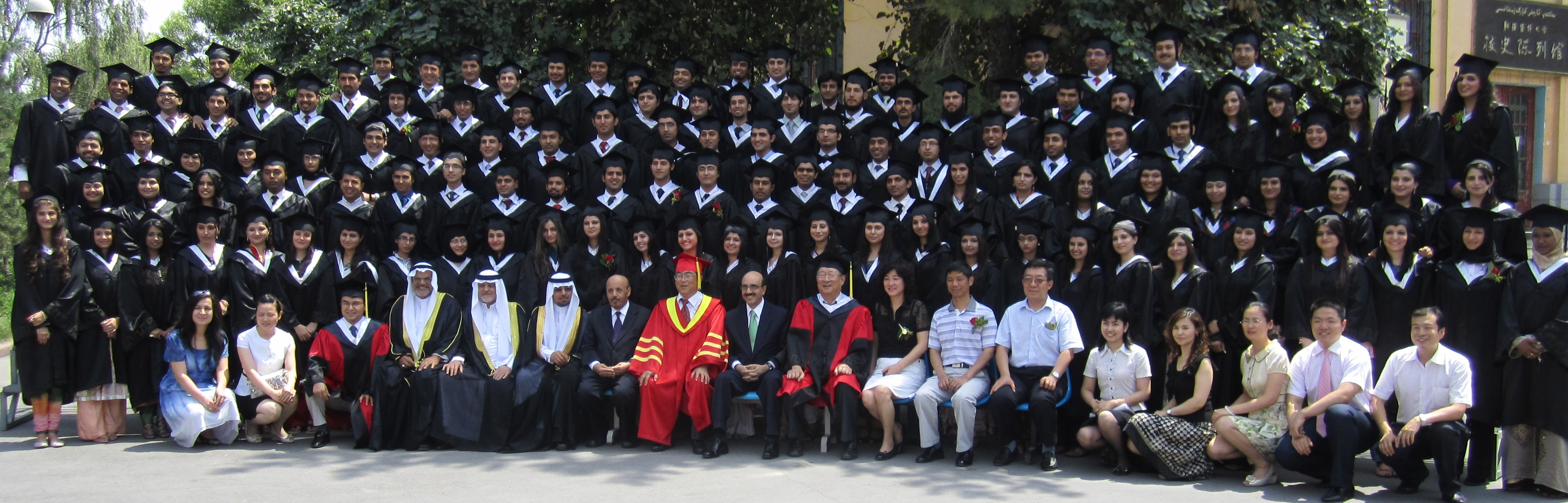
6th batch of International Education College graduation ceremony with Pakistani Ambassador Dr. Masood Khan and Saudi Embassy representative Saleh Alsagri

== History ==
Notification of recognition with Xinjiang Medical University by the UAE Embassy in Beijing

Chairman Mao Zedong and Premier Zhou Enlai ordered the Ministry of Health to work with the Soviet Union Ministry of Foreign Affairs to build a new medical centre in Xinjiang city of Dihua (now the city of Ürümqi). The decision was based upon instructions provided by Saifuddin Azizi.

The university was founded by incorporating the Traditional Chinese Medicine College of Xinjiang Medical University with the Xinjiang Medical College. Before incorporation, Xinjiang Medical College was amongst 156 key projects aided by the former Soviet Union during the First Five-Year Plan and began recruiting new students in 1956. During its 60 years of existence, the university has received attention from national and international leaders, including Chinese Communist Party officials and other provincial and urban figures across China.

== Seal ==
Old version of Seal

The seal of Xinjiang Medical University was created in 1956 and certifies official paper work issued by staff. Use of the seal is overseen by the administration of the university, and its security is governed by the university's constitution.

== Structure and composition ==
Presently, the university comprises eight medical and allied colleges: the Medical College, Public Health College, Traditional Medicine College, Basic Medical Sciences College, Pharmacy College, Nurses Training College, Continuing Education College, and Vocational College.

The university students can attain the Doctor of Medicine (MD) degree after successful completion of a seven-year course.

Xinjiang Medical University is affiliated with all hospitals in the region and, as of 2010, manages 40 clinical positions throughout these centres. The foremost affiliated hospital facilitates clinical teaching, internship placements for PhD students, a seven-year training program for postgraduate students and supervision of international students.

== Faculty ==
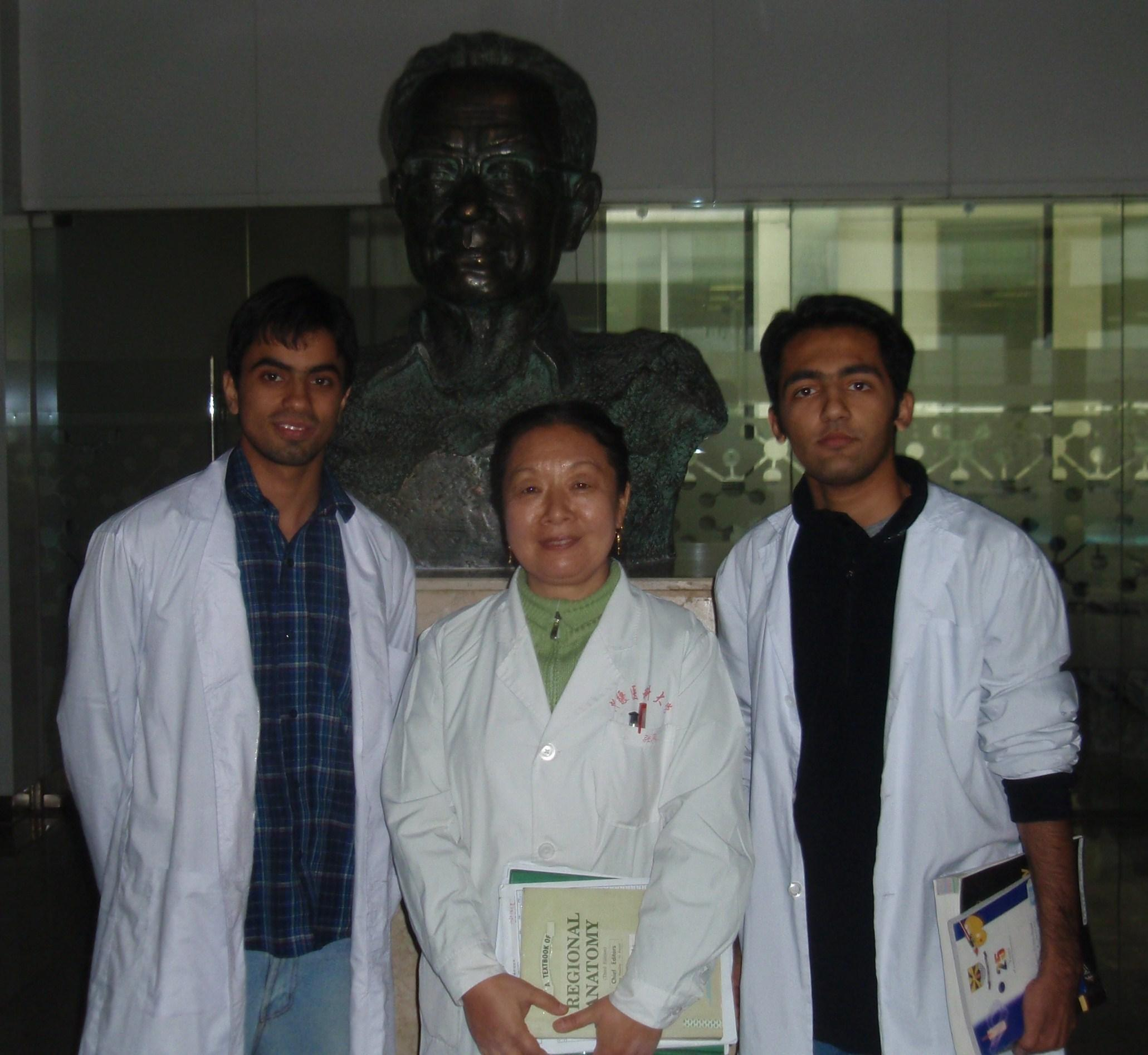
Students with Anatomy Professor Zhang Lan

In 2010, the teaching faculty consisted of 1163 professors and assistant professors, and 4290 employees in other roles. The university has instituted 400 supervisory positions for doctorate and masters students.

== Campus ==
The campus has a number of buildings from the late Russian era in Xinjiang. Xinjiang Medical University campus has been completely updated and modernized and a library, canteens, hospitals and training centres are included facilities. The experimental laboratories include modern bioinformation processing systems and models. The new campus of Xinjiang Medical University is expected to start in 2020. The total building area of the two new medical buildings is approximately 134,838 square meters, with a total cost of 390.5 million yuan ($56.25 million). The new campus covers an area of 126.67 hectares, with a total floor area of 739,000 square meters and a total investment of 4.08 billion yuan, which can accommodate about 24,000 teachers and students.

=== Library ===
President Li Bin with Professor Khalid A. Al-Homodi of the Qasim University, Saudi Arabia

In 1995, the university built a new library building which now covers 16,000 m^{2} and has over 1.07 million books. There are more than 1,300 periodicals and journals available in Chinese and other languages. Six book databases have been introduced and there is a connection to Partners Harvard Medical International's library database. The library seats more than 2500 in the readers area and over 350 in the electronic library access area.

Floor	Distribution
First floor	Main readers' area; anti-theft computed system entry; electronic LCDs; main borrowing and lending counter for students
Second floor	Foreign languages department
Third floor	Newspapers, journals, western medicine, Chinese medicine, social sciences
Fourth floor	Foreign languages reference books, Chinese and western literature
Fifth floor	Online book database control room, Harvard University Medical e-library Center
Sixth floor	Office of the librarian and conference room

Every floor has a central area of reading for daily readers; the fifth and sixth floors have dedicated thesis areas for doctoral students.

== International Education College in English Medium ==
A side view of a standard hostel dormitory

The International Education College of the Xinjiang Medical University (Chinese: 新疆医科大学国际教育学院) has recruited medical students since 1982. As of December 2018, more than 700 international students were studying at the college, both undergraduate and postgraduate, and there were over 450 faculty members. Career Counseling Education Consultancy is the Official partner to recruit international students in this university from Pakistan, Bangladesh, Gulf countries and some African countries.

In January 2009, the Government of the People's Republic of China announced a scholarship program that seeks to award students who perform well in the Faculty of Sciences (FSc) Pre-Medical degree. The students are required to study clinical medicine in Chinese for six years, and a passing score on the HSK band 3 (or above) is to be attained by scholarship holders within one year of admission.

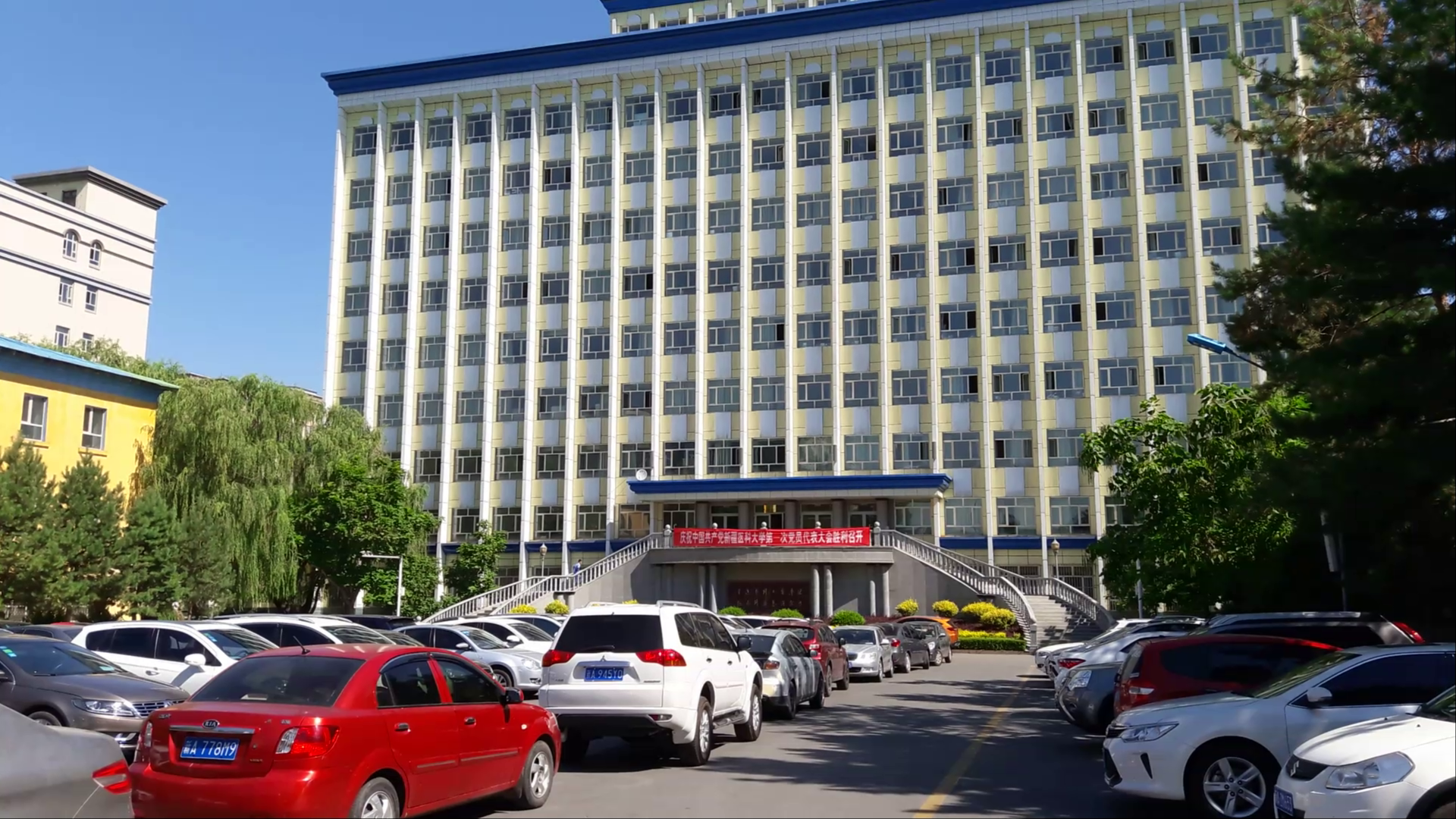
Xinjiang Medical University Campus

=== Subject arrangement ===
During the first two years of study, the curriculum includes basic theoretical subjects, such as anatomy, physiology, histology, embryology, biochemistry, and organic and inorganic chemistry. Clinical subjects, which begin in the third year, include gynecology, surgery, internal medicine, pediatrics, E.N.T., neurology, dermatology and psychiatry.

=== College administration ===
President Li Bin on International Exhibition & Conference on Higher Education held in Riyadh, Saudi Arabia with other school authorities

As of 2012, the Party Secretary of Xinjiang Medical University is Li Bin, whilst Muhammad Yasen is the president.

== Affiliations and accreditations ==
PMDC officials on visit to First Affiliated Hospital of Xinjiang Medical University

PMDC officials visit to Xinjiang Medical University

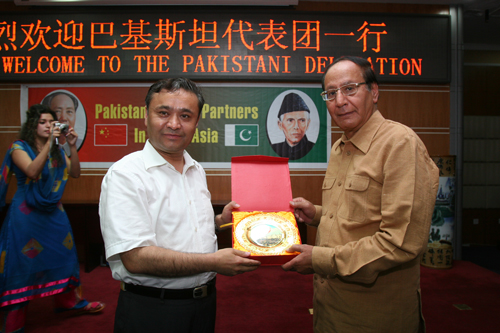
PML(Q) Chairman Chaudhry Shujaat Hussain with University President Halmurat Upur

Pakistani Ambassador Salman Bashir and delegation visit to Xinjiang Medical University

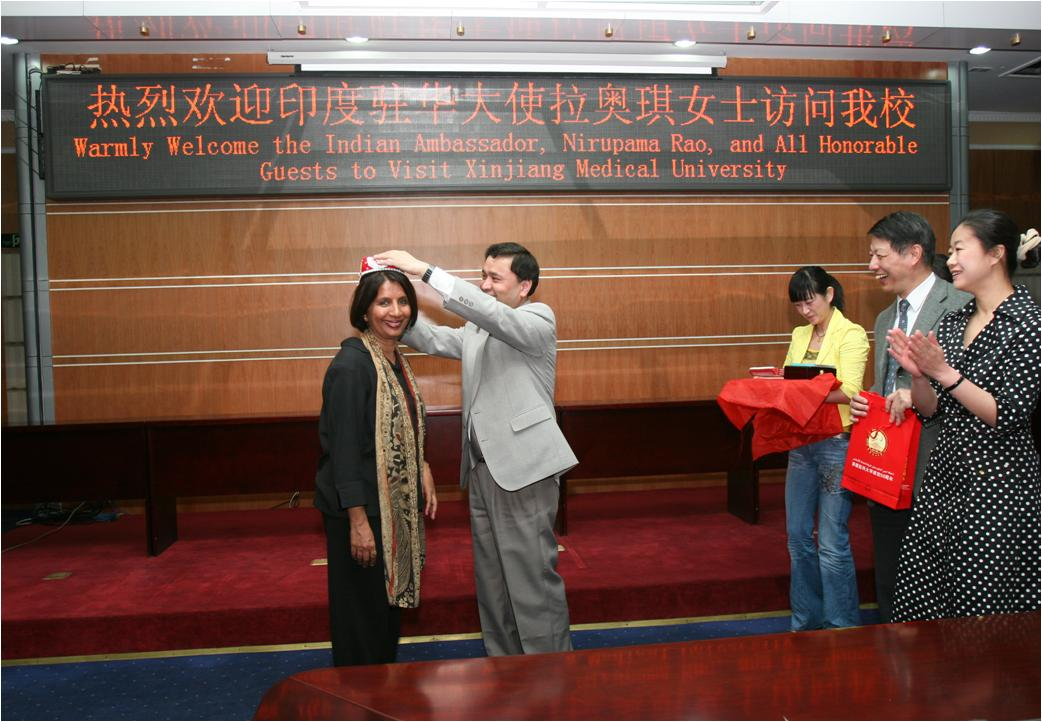
Indian Ambassador Nirupama Rao with University President Halmurat Upur

Country	Affiliated institutions and governmental departments
Pakistan	Pakistan Medical and Dental Council (de-recognized 2012) Dow University of Health Sciences; Khyber Medical College; Quaid-e-Azam Medical College; Ayub Medical College; Frontier Medical College
People's Republic of China.	Ministry of Health Ministry of Education (1998) School of Biomedical Sciences, the Chinese University of Hong Kong
India	Medical Council of India
United States	University of Washington; Foundation for Advancement of International Medical Education and Research Harvard Medical International (2004); Educational Commission for Foreign Medical Graduates; IMED – FAIMER International Medical Education Directory
France	University of Franche-Comté (1994) Victor Segalen Bordeaux 2 University (2007)
England	University of Birmingham
Russia	Saint Petersburg State University
Japan	Nihon University Nagasaki University; Asahikawa Medical College
United Arab Emirates	Ministry of Higher Education and Scientific Research
Kingdom of Saudi Arabia	Ministry of Higher Education
New Zealand	Bioactives Research New Zealand
International	World Health Organization

== Achievements ==
Since 1998, the university has won 58 provincial and ministerial level scientific research awards. It is listed among the top colleges and universities performing scientific research in the Autonomous Region. It is the only institution in China to win the "Chinese Medical Academic Award" in four consecutive years. The university topped the universities that were being observed by the National Natural Science Foundation of China.

As of 22 July 2009, the university was one of seven such institutions in the republic to be recognized by the Pakistan Medical & Dental Council (this was in addition to recognition already granted by the Medical Council of India).

=== Ranking ===
- World Rank 2944 as on 24.04.2020
- First among medical universities in Xinjiang, People's Republic of China
- Holds 37th position among "Top Chinese Universities in Medicine, 2011"
- 49th position in China Medical Universities Rankings 2012, an annual list of China's top universities by China University Assessment
- 388th position in China overall, ranking by Webometrics Ranking of World Universities
- 236th university in China overall, having a score of 20.00

== See also ==
- List of universities in Xinjiang
