= Zhang He (politician) =

Chinese politician

- 张和

Deputy Party Group Secretary of the CPC Hebei Provincial Committee
- In office January 2011 – March 2012

Vice-Governor of Hebei
- In office October 2006 – January 2011
- Governor: Guo Gengmao→Hu Chunhua→Chen Quanguo

Communist Party Secretary of Tangshan
- In office March 2005 – October 2006
- Preceded by: Bai Runzhang
- Succeeded by: Zhao Yong

Mayor of Tangshan
- In office March 1995 – December 2002
- Preceded by: Liang Zhizhong
- Succeeded by: Zhang Yaohua

Personal details
- Born: December 1950 (age 75) Qianxi County, Hebei, China
- Party: Chinese Communist Party (expelled; 1978–2020)
- Education: Hebei Normal University

Chinese name
- Traditional Chinese: 張和
- Simplified Chinese: 张和
Transcriptions
Standard Mandarin
- Hanyu Pinyin: Zhāng Hé

Zhang He (Chinese: 张和; born December 1950) is a retired Chinese politician formerly served as vice-governor of Hebei between 2006 and 2011. As of April 2020 he was under investigation by the Communist Party's anti-corruption agency. He is the ninth provincial and ministerial level official investigated in Hebei province after the 18th National Congress of the Chinese Communist Party.

== Early life and education ==
Zhang was born in Qianxi County, Hebei, in December 1950, one year and two months after the establishment of the Communist State. During the Cultural Revolution, he worked in his home-county. In August 1973, he was accepted to Hebei Normal University, where he majored in mathematics.

== Career ==
After graduating in August 1976, he became an official in the Communist Youth League of Qianxi County. In April 1978, he was transferred to Tangshan, where he successively served as a section member, secretary-general of Tangshan government, assistant mayor, vice-mayor, acting mayor, mayor, and Party secretary. In March 2005, he became a member of the CCP Hebei Provincial Committee. In October 2006 he was promoted to become vice-governor of Hebei, a position he held until his retirement in January 2011. Then he was appointed deputy Party Group secretary of the CCP Hebei Provincial Committee.

== Downfall ==
On April 29, he was put under investigation for alleged "serious violations of discipline and laws" by the Central Commission for Discipline Inspection (CCDI), the party's internal disciplinary body, and the National Supervisory Commission, the highest anti-corruption agency of China. On July 28, 2020, he was expelled from the Chinese Communist Party over serious violations of Party discipline and laws. The anti-corruption agency said in a statement that "Zhang lost his ideals and convictions and was disloyal and dishonest to the Party, he had violated the eight-point frugality code on Party and government conduct by visiting private clubs and attending banquets, and he was also found to have appointed officials against Party regulations, accepted gifts and money, and allowed relatives to seek personal gains by taking advantage of his position." He was demoted to the fourth level investigator position (四级调研员).

Government offices
Preceded by Liang Zhizhong (梁志忠)	Mayor of Tangshan; 1995-2002	Succeeded by Zhang Yaohua (张耀华)
Party political offices
Preceded by Bai Runzhang (白润璋)	Party Secretary of Tangshan; 2005-2006	Succeeded by Zhao Yong (赵勇)
