= Xinjiang Agricultural University =

University in Ürümqi, Xinjiang Uyghur Autonomous Region, China

Coordinates: 43.814043°N 87.566311°E

- 新疆农业大学
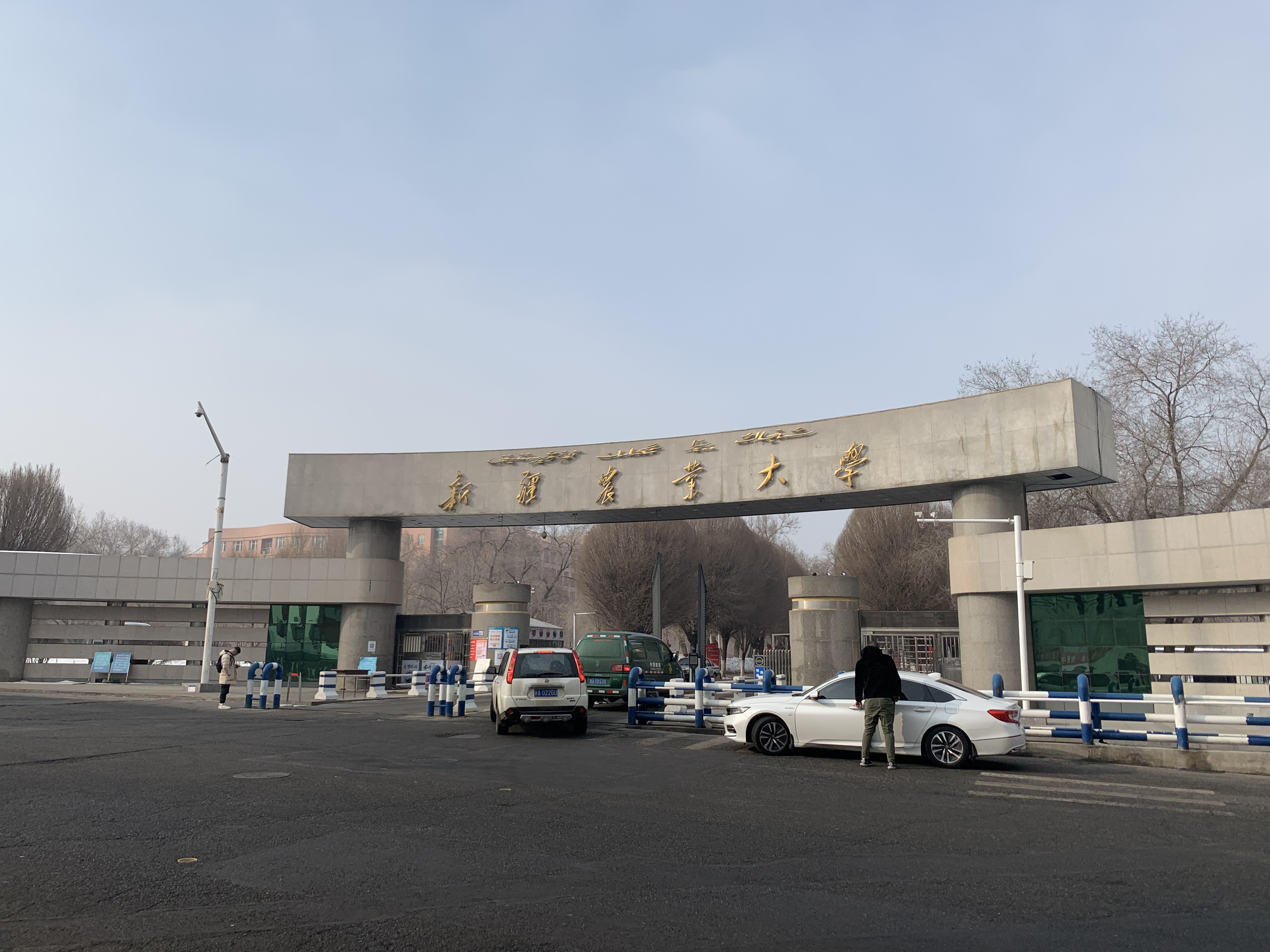
- Other name: شىنجاڭ يېزائېگىلىك ئۇنىۋېرسىتېتى
- Former name: Xinjiang Eight-One Agriculture College
- Established: 1951; 75 years ago
- Founder: Wang Zhen
- Principal: Luo Qiuzhang, 雒秋江
- Location: Ürümqi, Xinjiang Uyghur Autonomous Region, People's Republic of China
- Language: Chinese
- Website: www.xjau.edu.cn

Xinjiang Agricultural University (XAU) (Chinese: 新疆农业大学; pinyin: Xīnjiāng Nóngyè Dàxué; Uyghur: شىنجاڭ يېزائېگىلىك ئۇنىۋېرسىتېتى) is a higher education institution in Ürümqi, the capital of the Xinjiang Uyghur Autonomous Region, China. It specializes in courses and research relating to construction in agricultural contexts.

== History ==
XAU was founded on 1 August 1952, by the PLA general Wang Zhen under the auspices of Chairman Mao Zedong and Premier Zhou Enlai. Originally named Xinjiang Eight-One Agriculture College (Chinese: 新疆八一农学院), it was built on the site of a PLA 2nd Infantry Division School. It was renamed Xinjiang Agricultural University on 21 April 1995.

Over the half century, XAU has developed into a multi-level and discipline institution that takes the undergraduate education as the basis with the coordinated development of doctor education, master education, international education, higher vocational education and continuing education.

In June 2023, the Ministry of Education sanctioned that Zhejiang University, along with nine other universities, provide "group-type" support to Xinjiang Agricultural University, with Zhejiang University as the lead institution, Nanjing Agricultural University and Northwest Agriculture and Forestry University as deputy leaders, and Beijing Forestry University, North China Electric Power University, Hohai University, Jiangnan University, Hefei University of Technology, and China Ocean University as participating members.

== Campuses ==
The campus of Xinjiang Agricultural University covers an area of 1496 acres. It is quiet, beautiful and well known as a garden university since its greenery is so extensive.

In addition, it has two practice farms, called Sanping and South Mountain. The former covers 2,755,800 million square meters and the latter covers more than 4,600 square meters.

== Departments ==
- School of Agriculture
- School of Forestry and Horticulture
- School of Grassland and Environmental Sciences
- School of Animal Sciences
- School of Veterinary Medicine
- School of Food sciences and Pharmacy
- School of Irrigation and Civil Engineering
- School of Mechanical Transportation
- School of Information and Computer Technology Engineering
- School of Chemical Engineering
- School of Mathematics
- School of Economics and Trade
- School of Management
- School of Chinese Language Studies
- School of Foreign Languages
- Education and Research Department for Philosophy, Politics and Theory
- Education and Research Department for Physical Sports
- School of International Education
- School of Continuing Education
- School of Science and Technology
- Centre for MPA Education

== Faculty ==
There are over 800 faculty and over 20,000 students at XAU. From 1986 to the present, more than 800 long- and short-term foreign students from 20 countries who have finished their study and graduated from XAU in the disciplines of Chinese language, Uygur language, Kazak language, animal husbandry and grassland, etc. Xinjiang Uygur Autonomous Region where XAU is located is a multi-ethnic area.

== See also ==
- List of universities in Xinjiang
- List of universities in China
