= AH68 =

Road in Asia

Asian Highway 68 (AH68) is a road in the Asian Highway Network running 278 km (174 miles) from Jinghe, Xinjiang, China to Usharal, Kazakhstan connecting AH5 to AH60. The route is as follows:

== China ==
- G3018: Jinghe - Alataw Pass
- G219 : Alataw Pass - Kazakh border

== Kazakhstan ==
=== Post 2024 road numbering scheme ===
- KZ19-02 : Chinese border - Alatau - Dostyk - Usharal

=== 2011-2024 road numbering scheme ===
- A-7 : Chinese border - Alatau - Dostyk - Usharal
