= Aktogay, East Kazakhstan Region =

Aktogay Ақтоғай
- urban-type settlement
- Interactive map of Aktogay
- Coordinates: 46°57′N 79°40′E
- Country: Kazakhstan
- Region: Abai
- District: Ayagoz

Population (1999)
  - Total: 5,200
- Time zone: +6
- Postal code: 070205

Aktogay (Kazakh: Ақтоғай, Aqtoğai, اقتوعاي Kazakh pronunciation: [ɑqtwʊʁɑj]) is a town in Ayagoz District, Abai Region of Kazakhstan and major railway hub of Turkestan-Siberian Railway.

Aktogay is located in Balkhash-Alakol lowlands, close to Balkhash lake. The Ayagoz river's mouth is located nearby Aktogay. The climate is continental. Summer is hot +40°, winter is cold -40°. The distance to district center Ayagoz is 100 km, to the region center Ust-Kamenogorsk is 420 km, to Astana, the capital of Kazakhstan is 1250 km.

The major copper deposit is discovered close to Aktogay town. This is the fourth reserves of copper in the world. Aktogay Mine and copper extraction plant was completed there and the copper cathodes production started in 2011. The capital cost account $1.5-2 billion and the production capacity is 100.000 tones per annum. The city is about 30 km from Lake Balkhash.

== Transport ==
Aktogay lies on the main line of Turkestan–Siberia Railway. As a result of the Soviet–Chinese accords of 1956, the railway to Dostyk (in Alataw Pass) was built in 1959, but by that time relations between two countries had soured and Chinese Lanxin railway was not extended to Kazakhstan border in the following thirty years. In 1985 Aktogay was linked with Sayaq station, so a railway connection to Central Kazakhstan become available. After connection with China at the Alataw Pass in 1990, a railway bridge Ürümqi—Dostyk—Aktogay—Sayak—Balqash—Moyynty was created.

In 2012, a new line was opened between Zhetigen, via a break-of-gauge trans-shipment hub at Korgas, to a junction in China at Jinghe.

Services at Aktogay railway station
Preceding station	KTJ	Following station
Tansyk towards Novosibirsk, Russia	Turkestan–Siberia Railway	Junction №33 towards Arys I
Terminus	Turkestan–Siberia Railway; Aktogay–Dostyk branch	Aktogay-Vostochnyy towards Dostyk
Preduzlovaya towards Moiynty	Turkestan–Siberia Railway; Moiynty–Dostyk branch	Terminus

== Climate ==
Climate data for Aktogay, Abai (coordinates:46°54′N 79°36′E, 1991-2020)
Month	Jan	Feb	Mar	Apr	May	Jun	Jul	Aug	Sep	Oct	Nov	Dec	Year
Mean daily maximum °C (°F)	−8.6 (16.5)	−5.4 (22.3)	4.2 (39.6)	18.0 (64.4)	25.0 (77.0)	30.8 (87.4)	32.4 (90.3)	31.0 (87.8)	24.4 (75.9)	15.4 (59.7)	3.9 (39.0)	−4.9 (23.2)	13.9 (56.9)
Daily mean °C (°F)	−13.7 (7.3)	−10.8 (12.6)	−1.6 (29.1)	10.3 (50.5)	16.9 (62.4)	22.9 (73.2)	24.6 (76.3)	22.9 (73.2)	16.0 (60.8)	7.6 (45.7)	−2.0 (28.4)	−9.9 (14.2)	6.9 (44.5)
Mean daily minimum °C (°F)	−18.2 (−0.8)	−15.6 (3.9)	−6.6 (20.1)	3.2 (37.8)	8.8 (47.8)	14.8 (58.6)	16.7 (62.1)	14.6 (58.3)	7.9 (46.2)	1.3 (34.3)	−6.5 (20.3)	−14.2 (6.4)	0.5 (32.9)
Average precipitation mm (inches)	15.0 (0.59)	12.2 (0.48)	12.0 (0.47)	13.5 (0.53)	14.9 (0.59)	16.6 (0.65)	19.5 (0.77)	14.1 (0.56)	11.2 (0.44)	20.0 (0.79)	26.9 (1.06)	19.7 (0.78)	195.6 (7.71)
Average precipitation days (≥ 1.0 mm)	4.6	4	3.4	2.9	3.4	3.5	3.3	2.3	2.3	4.4	5.8	5.8	45.7
Source: NOAA

== See also ==
- Railway stations in Kazakhstan
