= List of railway stations in Kazakhstan =

Railway stations in Kazakhstan include:

== Maps ==
- UN Map
- reliefweb map

== Towns ==
(Stations should be in line order)

=== Existing ===
- Ganyushkino - near Russian border
- Atyrau
- Beyneu
- Aqtau - port on Caspian Sea
- Aqtobe - near Russian border
- Embi
- Shalqar
- Baikonur - spaceport
- Qyzylorda
- Tashkent, Uzbekistan
- Shymkent
- Zhambyl
- Dostyk-Alashankou on China border; break-of-gauge
- Kokshetau - Kokshetau-1 railway station, Kokshetau-2 railway station
- Almaty - Almaty-1 railway station, Almaty-2 railway station
- Shu - junction
- Beskol
- Saryshagan
- Balqash
- Sayak
- Qaraghandy
- Nur-Sultan - Astana railway station
- Aktogay - Aktogay railway station

- (Second through route opened 2012)
- Zhetigen, Kazakhstan
- Altynkol railway station
- 1,520 mm (4 ft 11 27/32 in) gauge
- Korgas Transfer Hub on border with China; break-of-gauge
- 1,435 mm (4 ft 8 1/2 in) gauge
- Jinghe, China - junction

== Under construction ==
- Uzen
- Gyzylgaya, Turkmenistan
- Bereket
- Etrek
- Gorgan, Iran

- The proposed standard gauge line across Kazakhstan to China will be announced later in 2010 under the auspicies of the ECO.

== See also ==
- Transport in Kazakhstan
- Break-of-gauge
- Tengri Unitrade CARGO
