= G3019 Bole–Alashankou Expressway =

Expressway in China

Bole–Alashankou Expressway
- 博乐－阿拉山口高速公路
- Bo'a Expressway 博阿高速公路

Route information
- Auxiliary route of G30
- Length: 72.44 km (45.01 mi)

Major junctions
- West end: G30 in Jinghe County, Bortala, Xinjiang
- East end: G3018 in Bole, Bortala, Xinjiang

Location
- Country: China

Highway system
- National Trunk Highway System; Primary; Auxiliary; National Highways; Transport in China
← G3018	→ G3021

The G3019 Bole–Alashankou Expressway (Chinese: 博乐－阿拉山口高速公路), commonly referred to as the Bo'a Expressway (Chinese: 博阿高速公路), is an expressway under construction between Jinghe County and Alashankou in the Chinese autonomous region of Xinjiang. It will serve as a connection between Alashankou, which serves as a major border crossing between China and Kazakhstan known as the Alataw Pass, and the county-level city of Bole. The expressway is an auxiliary route of the G30 Lianyungang–Khorgas Expressway.

Despite its name, the expressway begins just south of the county-level city of Bole, in Jinghe County, and terminates south of Alashankou, at an interchange with the future G3018 Jinghe–Alashankou Expressway, near the present-day Bole railway station on the Northern Xinjiang railway. The G3018 Jinghe–Alashankou Expressway will continue northward to Alashankou. The expressway will be 72.44 kilometres (45.01 mi) in length and is expected to open by the end of 2018.
