= Arkankergen massacre =

2012 attack in Kazakhstan on the border with China

Coordinates: 45°26′36.1″N 81°30′58.5″E

Arkankergen mass murder
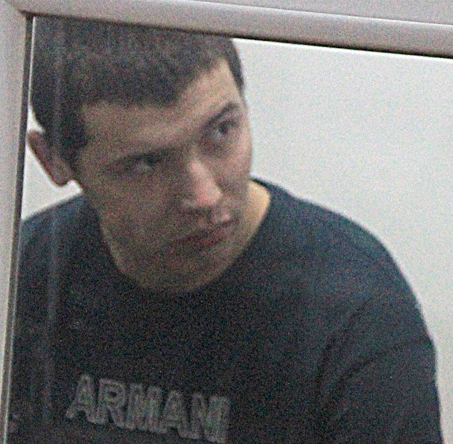
- Vladislav Chelakh, suspected killer
- Location: Arkankergen, Kazakhstan
- Date: 28 May 2012; 05:00 (UTC+06:00)
- Target: Border guards
- Attack type: Mass shooting, arson
- Weapons: AK-74, Makarov pistol
- Deaths: 15
- Injuries: 0
- Perpetrator: Vladislav Chelakh

The Arkankergen massacre occurred on 28 May 2012 in the Arkankergen military post in the Alakol District of Kazakhstan on the border with China, near the village of Usharal. Fifteen people were killed. A border guard, Vladislav Chelakh, initially confessed to the murders, but later retracted his confession.

== Events ==
=== Killings ===
Arkankergen is a border post between Kazakhstan and China. At 5 a.m. on 28 May 2012, communication with the border post was lost. When police from a nearby post came to investigate, they discovered the charred quarters and 14 corpses, also burned; a body of a local gamekeeper was found later at a nearby house. The bodies were subsequently identified as fourteen soldiers and one huntsman. The military post had been burned down. The bodies were identified with the help from Berlin's Charité Institute.

=== Investigation ===
Initially investigators considered a variety of causes, including a fight among the soldiers, an attack by religious extremists, and an assault by smugglers. The main version, however, was bullying. The sole survivor, Vladislav Chelakh, was the only ethnic Russian stationed at the post and investigators eventually surmised that the 19-year-old soldier had been subjected to hazing.

Vladislav Chelakh was arrested on 5 June 2012, wearing civilian clothes and not far from the area where the killings took place a week earlier. He was found in a mountain hut, carrying a pistol, a computer, and the mobile phones of the dead soldiers. He admitted to the crime the next day. He later retracted his confession, claiming it had been obtained under pressure.

=== Trial ===
On 20 December 2012, Chelakh was charged with murder; theft; illegally obtaining and distributing of state secrets; embezzlement or extortion of weapons, ammo, explosive devices; illegal acquisition, transfer, sale, storage, transfer or carrying of weapons and explosive devices; intentional destruction or damaging of military equipment; desertion; and violation of the housing's inviolability. He was convicted and sentenced to life in prison at a penal colony, although his appeals are ongoing. He escaped execution as the country had abolished capital punishment for most crimes three years earlier.

Chelakh's mother maintains that lawyers have refused to defend her son and those who agree charge $2,000 a month, so she is planning an appeal to International Court in Belgium. She described her boy as incapable of such a rampage. Chelakh's grandfather Vladimir publicly stated he thought his grandson was being scapegoated. In October 2012, Chelakh attempted suicide by hanging himself.

President Nursultan Abishuly Nazarbayev declared a day of national mourning and has ordered a special investigation of the incident. The head of the regional border patrol, Alexey Fomin, was also arrested a month after the event for failing to report the border post communication failure. Furthermore, local newsmen have resigned, claiming there is a large-scale cover-up.

On 16 July 2025, the constitutional court ruled that due to the fact that the death penalty in Kazakhstan was quashed, it is unconstitutional to automatically make parole impossible for people who would have been executed if not for the moratorium. It used to be impossible for such convicts to get parole.

In August 2025, Chelakh's lawyer still claims that he is innocent and that she thinks it is possible for him to be paroled.

== List of victims ==
No.	Name	Kazakh name	Year of birth	Rank	Place of birth
1.	Kereev Altynbek Qūtjanūly	Кереев Алтынбек Құтжанұлы	1984	Captain	West Kazakhstan Province
2.	Aqyşov Erlan Erğaliūly	Ақышов Ерлан Ерғалиұлы	1988	Sergeant	Almaty Province
3.	Aqylbaev Rüstem Bağdatūly	Ақылбаев Рүстем Бағдатұлы	1991	Soldier	Almaty Province
4.	Särsembaev Talğat Amangeldıūly	Сәрсембаев Талғат Амангелдіұлы	1984	Soldier	Almaty Province
5.	Ağanas Qambar Asqarūly	Ағанас Қамбар Асқарұлы	1991	Soldier	Aktobe Province
6.	Ämırğaliev Bekzat Abatūly	Әмірғалиев Бекзат Абатұлы	1989	Soldier	Atyrau Province
7.	Balğabaev Daniiar Ğarifollaūly	Балғабаев Данияр Ғарифоллаұлы	1992	Soldier	Atyrau Province
8.	Iliiasov Janat Qanatūly	Ілиясов Жанат Қанатұлы	1992	Soldier	Jambyl Province
9.	İmenov Meiırhan Sağyndyqūly	Именов Мейірхан Сағындықұлы	1992	Soldier	Atyrau Province
10.	Maqsatov Äli Iztūrğanūly	Мақсатов Әли Ізтұрғанұлы	1992	Soldier	Aktobe Province
11.	Mūqaşev Nūrlanbek Quatbekūly	Мұқашев Нұрланбек Қуатбекұлы	1991	Soldier	Karagandy Province
12.	Rei Denis Viktorovich	Рей Денис Викторович	1993	Soldier	Pavlodar Province
13.	Sağynğaliev Jeñıs Däuletūly	Сағынғалиев Жеңіс Дәулетұлы	1990	Soldier	Atyrau Province
14.	Üsıpäliev Nūrjas Düisembaiūly	Үсіпәлиев Нұржас Дүйсембайұлы	1991	Soldier	Jambyl Province
15.	Kim Ruslan Nikolaevich	Ким Руслан Николаевич	1964	Huntsman	Taldykorgan
