= G3018 Jinghe–Alashankou Expressway =

Expressway in China

Jinghe–Alashankou Expressway
- 精河－阿拉山口高速公路
- Jing'a Expressway 精阿高速公路

Route information
- Auxiliary route of G30
- Length: 68.66 km (42.66 mi)

Major junctions
- South end: G30 in Jinghe County, Bortala, Xinjiang
- G3019 in Bole, Bortala, Xinjiang
- North end: Alashankou, Bortala, Xinjiang

Location
- Country: China

Highway system
- National Trunk Highway System; Primary; Auxiliary; National Highways; Transport in China
← G3017	→ G3019

The G3018 Jinghe–Alashankou Expressway (Chinese: 精河－阿拉山口高速公路), commonly referred to as the Jing'a Expressway (Chinese: 精阿高速公路), is an expressway under construction between Jinghe County and Alashankou in Bortala Mongol Autonomous Prefecture, Xinjiang, China. It will serve as a connection between Alashankou, the site of the Alataw Pass, which serves as a major border crossing between China and Kazakhstan, and the G30 Lianyungang–Khorgas Expressway at Jinghe. The expressway will be 68.66 kilometres (42.66 mi) in length. It will connect to the future G3019 Bole–Alashankou Expressway at about the halfway point, near the Bole railway station on the Northern Xinjiang railway. It is expected to open at the end of 2018.
