= Tuotuo =

Tuotuo may refer to:

- the Ulan Moron, the headwater of the Yangtze known as the Tuotuo He (沱沱河) in Chinese
- Todok township in Xinjiang, known as Tuotuoxiang (托托乡) in Chinese
- Toqto'a, the Yuan minister known as Tuotuo (脫脫) in Chinese
