= List of highways numbered 14 =

Route 14, or Highway 14, can refer to:

== International ==
- AH14 Asian Highway 14
- E14 European route E14
- E014 European route E014

== Argentina ==
- National Route 14

== Australia ==
- Diamantina Developmental Road (Queensland)
- Birdsville Developmental Road (Queensland)
- Sandover Highway
- – SA

== Austria ==
- Rheintal/Walgau Autobahn

== Canada ==
- Alberta Highway 14
- British Columbia Highway 14
- Manitoba Highway 14
- Nova Scotia Trunk 14
- Ontario Highway 14
- Prince Edward Island Route 14
- Saskatchewan Highway 14

== Costa Rica ==
- National Route 14

== Cuba ==
- 2–14

== Czech Republic ==
- I/14 Highway; Czech: Silnice I/14

== Djibouti ==
- RN-14 (Djibouti)

== Greece ==
- EO14 road

== Guatemala ==
- National Highway 14 (Guatemala)
- National Chris Schwartz Highway 14 (Guatemala

== India ==
- National Highway 14 (India)

== Indonesia ==
- Indonesian National Route 14

== Iran ==
- Road 14

== Ireland ==
- N14 road (Ireland)

== Italy ==
- Autostrada A14
- RA 14

== Japan ==
- Japan National Route 14
- Futtsu Tateyama Road
- Keiyō Road
- Tateyama Expressway

== Korea, South ==
- Hamyang–Ulsan Expressway
- National Route 14

== Malaysia ==
- Johor Bahru Eastern Dispersal Link Expressway
- FT 14 Malaysia Federal Route 14
- B14 Jalan Klang Lama
- J14 Jalan Kampung Sembrong Dalam
- M14 Jalan Merlimau Darat, Jalan Batu Gajah
- P14 Jalan Tun Sardon

== Moldova ==
- M14 highway (Moldova)

== New Zealand ==
- New Zealand State Highway 14

== Nigeria ==
- A14 highway (Nigeria)

== Paraguay ==
- National Route 14

== Romania ==
- A14 motorway (Romania)

== South Africa ==
- N14 road (South Africa)

== Turkiyë ==
State road D.014 (Turkey)

== Ukraine ==
- Highway M14 (Ukraine)

== United Kingdom ==
- British A14 (Catthorpe-Felixstowe)

== United States ==
- Interstate 14
- U.S. Route 14
- New England Interstate Route 14 (former)
  - County Route 14 (Lee County, Alabama)

Alabama State Route 14

- Arkansas Highway 14
- California State Route 14
  - County route A14 (California)
  - County Route E14 (California)
  - County Route G14 (California)
  - County Route J14 (California)
  - County Route S14 (California)
- Colorado State Highway 14
- Connecticut Route 14
- Delaware Route 14
- Florida State Road 14
  - County Road 14 (Madison County, Florida)
  - County Road 14 (Taylor County, Florida)
- Georgia State Route 14
- Idaho State Highway 14
- Illinois Route 14
- Indiana State Road 14
- Iowa Highway 14
- K-14 (Kansas highway)
- Kentucky Route 14
- Louisiana Highway 14
  - Louisiana State Route 14 (former)
- Maryland Route 14
- Massachusetts Route 14
- M-14 (Michigan highway)
- County Road 14 (Anoka County, Minnesota)
  - County Road 14 (Dakota County, Minnesota)
  - County Road 14 (Goodhue County, Minnesota)
  - County Road 14 (Hennepin County, Minnesota)
- Mississippi Highway 14
- Missouri Route 14
- Nebraska Highway 14
  - Nebraska Link 14D (former)
  - Nebraska Spur 14B
  - Nebraska Spur 14C
  - Nebraska Spur 14H
- Nevada State Route 14 (former)
- New Jersey Route 14 (former)
  - County Route 14 (Monmouth County, New Jersey)
- New Mexico State Road 14
- New York State Route 14
  - County Route 14 (Albany County, New York)
  - County Route 14 (Allegany County, New York)
  - County Route 14 (Cayuga County, New York)
  - County Route 14 (Chemung County, New York)
  - County Route 14 (Delaware County, New York)
  - County Route 14 (Dutchess County, New York)
  - County Route 14 (Genesee County, New York)
  - County Route 14 (Greene County, New York)
  - County Route 14 (Niagara County, New York)
  - County Route 14 (Orange County, New York)
  - County Route 14 (Oswego County, New York)
  - County Route 14 (Putnam County, New York)
  - County Route 14 (Saratoga County, New York)
  - County Route 14 (Schoharie County, New York)
  - County Route 14 (St. Lawrence County, New York)
  - County Route 14 (Steuben County, New York)
  - County Route 14 (Suffolk County, New York)
  - County Route 14 (Sullivan County, New York)
  - County Route 14 (Tioga County, New York)
- North Carolina Highway 14
- North Dakota Highway 14
- Ohio State Route 14
- Oklahoma State Highway 14
- Oregon Route 14 (former)
- Pennsylvania Route 14
- Rhode Island Route 14
- South Carolina Highway 14
- Tennessee State Route 14
- Texas State Highway 14
  - Texas State Highway Loop 14
  - Farm to Market Road 14
  - Urban Road 14 (signed as Farm to Market Road 14)
  - Texas Park Road 14
- Utah State Route 14
- Vermont Route 14
- Virginia State Route 14
  - State Route 14 (Virginia 1918–1933) (former)
  - State Route 14 (Virginia 1933) (former)
- Washington State Route 14
  - Primary State Highway 14 (Washington) (former)
  - Secondary State Highway 14B (Washington) (former)
  - Secondary State Highway 14C (Washington) (former)
- West Virginia Route 14
- Wisconsin Highway 14 (former)
- Wyoming Highway 14

Territories

- Guam Highway 14
  - Guam Highway 14B
- Puerto Rico Highway 14
  - Puerto Rico Highway 14R

== Uruguay ==
- Route 14 Brigadier Gral. Venancio Flores

== Zambia ==
- M14 road (Zambia)

== See also ==
- List of A14 roads
- List of highways numbered 14A

Preceded by 13	Lists of highways 14	Succeeded by 15
