= Arqarly =

Arqarly Арқарлы
- Village
- Location in Kazakhstan
- Coordinates: 46°14′56″N 80°5′52″E
- Country: Kazakhstan
- Region: Jetisu Region
- District: Alakol District

Population (2009)
  - Total: 611
- Time zone: UTC+6 (Omsk Time)
- Postal code: 040206

Arqarly (Kazakh: Арқарлы, Arqarly) is a village in Jetisu Region of south-eastern Kazakhstan.
