= Dostyk railway station =

Railway station in Dostyk, Kazakhstan

Dostyk Достық бекеті
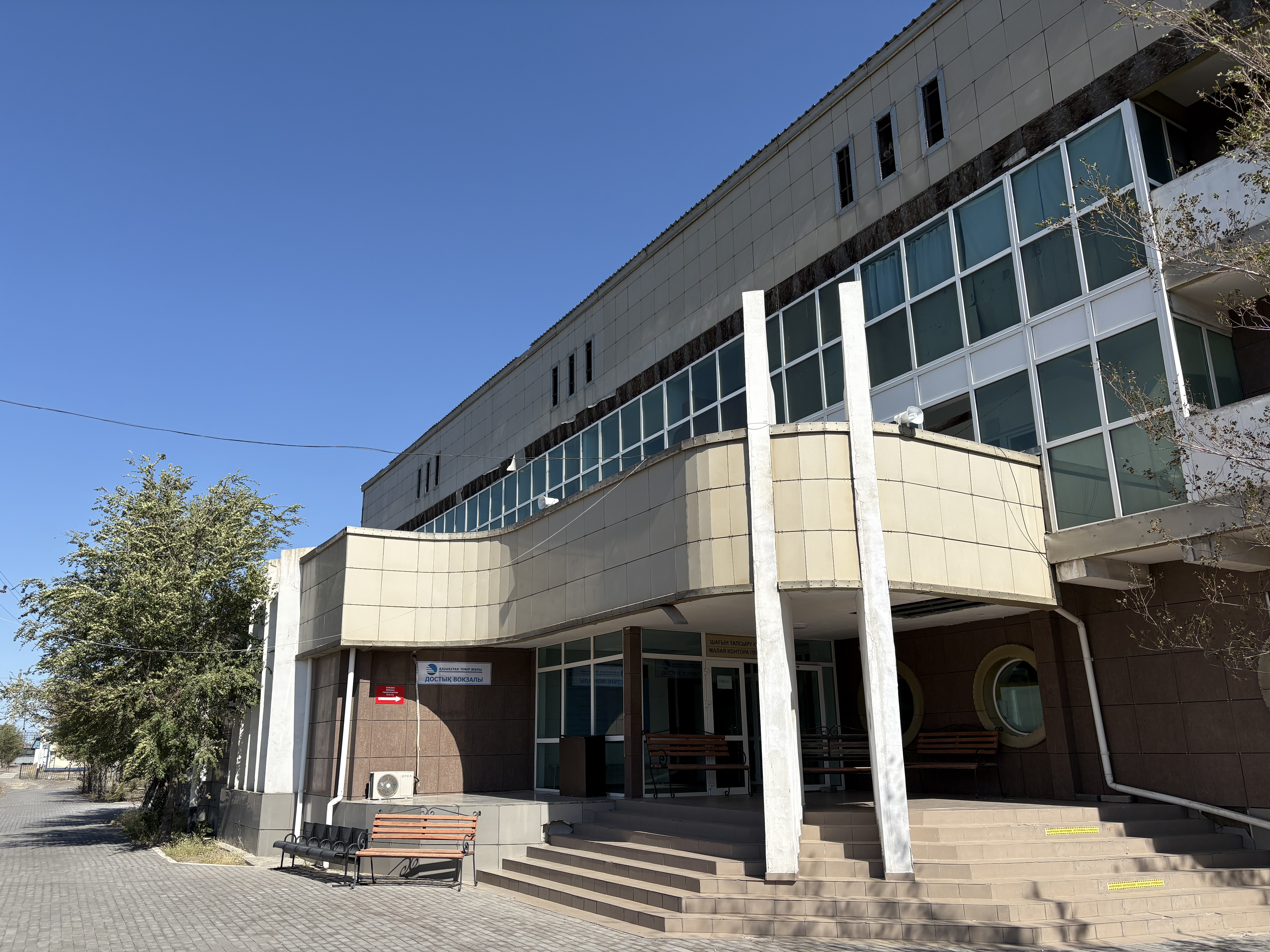

General information
- Location: Dostyk, Jetisu Region; Kazakhstan
- Coordinates: 45.253978°N 82.485480°E
- Line: Turkestan–Siberia Railway spur line

History
- Opened: 1954
- Previous names: Druzhba（1954-2007）

Services
| Preceding station | KTJ | Following station |
|---|---|---|
| N19 towards Aktogay | Turkestan–Siberia Railway; Aktogay–Dostyk branch | through to China Railway |
| Preceding station | China Railway | Following station |
| through to Aktogay-Dostyk railway | Northern Xinjiang railway | Alashankou towards Ürümqi |
Location

Dostyk Railway station (Kazakh: Достық бекеті, romanized: Dostyq beketi) is located in Dostyk, Kazakhstan, the border of China and Kazakhstan, a spur line railway station of Kazakhstan Temir Zholy. The old name of the station in the Soviet Union era was Druzhba, meaning "friendship" in Russian; in 2007 it was renamed to Dostyk, a Kazakh word with the same meaning.

The Chinese standard gauge (1,435 mm) is different from the Kazak broad gauge (1,520 mm) which means that a break-of-gauge is required in this station.

== See also ==
- Turkestan–Siberia Railway
- Aktogay railway station
- Alashankou railway station
