= Tunkuruz Hydroelectric Power Plant =

Hydroelectric power station in Almaty, Kazakhstan

Tunkuruz Hydroelectric Power Plant is a hydroelectric power plant in Beskol village, Alakol District, in Almaty Province, Kazakhstan.
