= European route E014 =

Road in trans-European E-road network

E014

Route information
- Length: 164 km (102 mi)

Major junctions
- From: Usharal
- To: Dostyk

Location
- Countries: Kazakhstan

Highway system
- International E-road network; A Class; B Class

E 014 is a European B class road in Kazakhstan, connecting the cities Usharal - Dostyk.

== Route ==
- Kazakhstan
  - Usharal
  - Dostyk
