= Nurtai Sabilianov =

Kazakh politician

MP Nurtai Sabilianov
- Нұртай Сабильянов
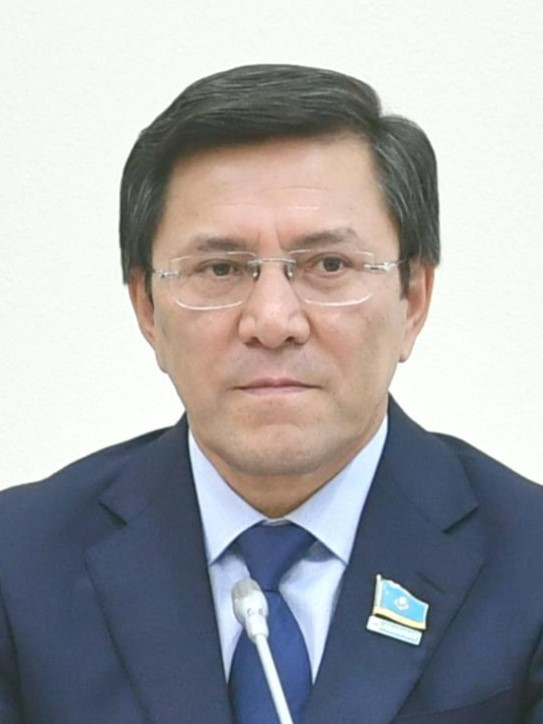
- Sabilianov in 2023

Member of the Mäjilis
- In office 2 September 2023 – 1 July 2026
- Chairman: Erlan Qoşanov
- In office 19 September 2004 – January 2021
- Chairman: See list: Oral Muhamedjanov; Aslan Musin; Oral Muhamedjanov; Nurlan Nigmatulin; Qabibolla Jaqypov; Baqtyqoja Izmuhambetov; Nurlan Nigmatulin

Member of the National Kurultai
- In office 14 June 2022 – 2023
- President: Kassym-Jomart Tokayev

Personal details
- Born: 1 May 1962 (age 64) Şynqoja, Ayaguz District, Semipalatinsk Oblast, Kazakh SSR, Soviet Union
- Party: Amanat
- Education: Narxoz University; KAZGUU University

Nūrtai Salihūly Sabilianov (Note: Often transliterated as Nurtay Salikhuly Sabilyanov through a Russified Romanization of Нуртай Салихулы Сабильянов.) (Kazakh: Нұртай Салихұлы Сабильянов; born 1 May 1962) is a Kazakh jurist and politician, who has served as Member of the Mäjilis since 2023 and again from 2004 to 2021.

== Early life and education ==
Sabilianov was born on 1 May 1962 in the village Şynqoja of Ayaguz District, Semipalatinsk Oblast, Soviet Kazakhstan (present-day Abai Region). He comes from the Uaq tribe of the Middle jüz.

Sabilianov started his career in 1979 as a shepherd to the komsomol-youth brigade of the "Narynsky" shepherds' sovkhoz in the Ayagoz District. He served for the Soviet Army from 1980 to 1982. Afterwards, from 1982 to 1984, he was a construction worker in the same sovkhoz.

From 1988 to 1990, he was an economist to the Alma-Ata electrical plant. After that, until March 2016, he served as an accountant.

He studied at Alma-Ata Institute of National Economy to become an economist in 1998. In 1999, he finished KAZGUU University as jurist. In 1994, he became certified as an auditor and in 1997, a securities market specialist.

== Career ==
=== Electoral history ===
Prior to his parliamentary career, Sabilianov has been an unsuccessful candidate for Parliament twice, in 1994 for the 13th Supreme Council and in 1999 and 2000 for the Mäjilis.

Sabilianov ran for member of the Mäjilis from the Nur Otan Party list in 2007, 2012, 2016, and 2023. He declined running in the 2021 Kazakh legislative election.

=== Mäjilis career ===
Sabilianov was elected Member of the Mäjilis through Kazakhstan's 25th electoral district on 19 September 2004. That day, he also started leading the Mäjilis Finances and Budget Committee until 20 June 2007. He kept being reelected until January 2021.

On 27 August 2007, he became member of the Finance and Budget Committee again until September 2016. Then, he was appointed chairman of the Economic Reform and Regional Development Committee until January 2021.

After starting his new non-consecutive term as MP from Kazakhstan's 8th electoral district as a result of the 2023 Kazakh legislative election on 27 March 2023, he was once again appointed Economic Reform and Regional Development Committee chairman on 29 March.

=== Other activities ===
Sabilianov is member of the Alumni Association Council of Narxoz University, the Chamber of Auditors of Kazakhstan since October 1994, and the State Committee of the Restoration of Economic Growth under the President since 27 May 2020.

Since March 2019, he has been a member to the Nur Otan Political Council Bureau. He was a member of the National Kurultai from 14 June 2022 to 2023. From 2021 to 2023, he was a chairman to the Saryarqa-Aluan LLP.

== Personal life ==
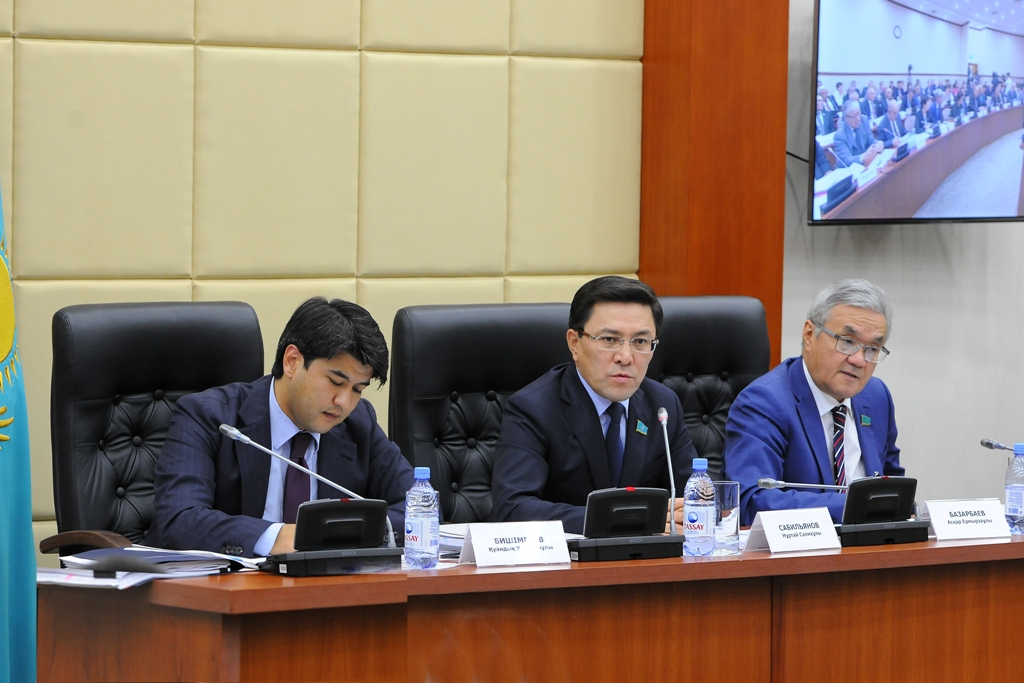
Kazakh politicians attend a Mäjilis session, from left to right: Quandyq Bishimbaev, Sabilianov, and Asqar Bazarbaev, 13 September 2016

Sabilianov is married to Nūrsäule Orzabaeva. They have 3 children: two sons and a daughter. Sabilianov speaks Kazakh and Russian.

== Honors and awards ==
Sabilianov's honors and awards include:

- Medal of Charity (2003)
- Order of Kurmet (2008)
- Order of Parasat (2018)
- Commonwealth Order (CIS, 2011)
- Honorary citizen of Ayagoz District
