= High-speed rail in Kazakhstan =

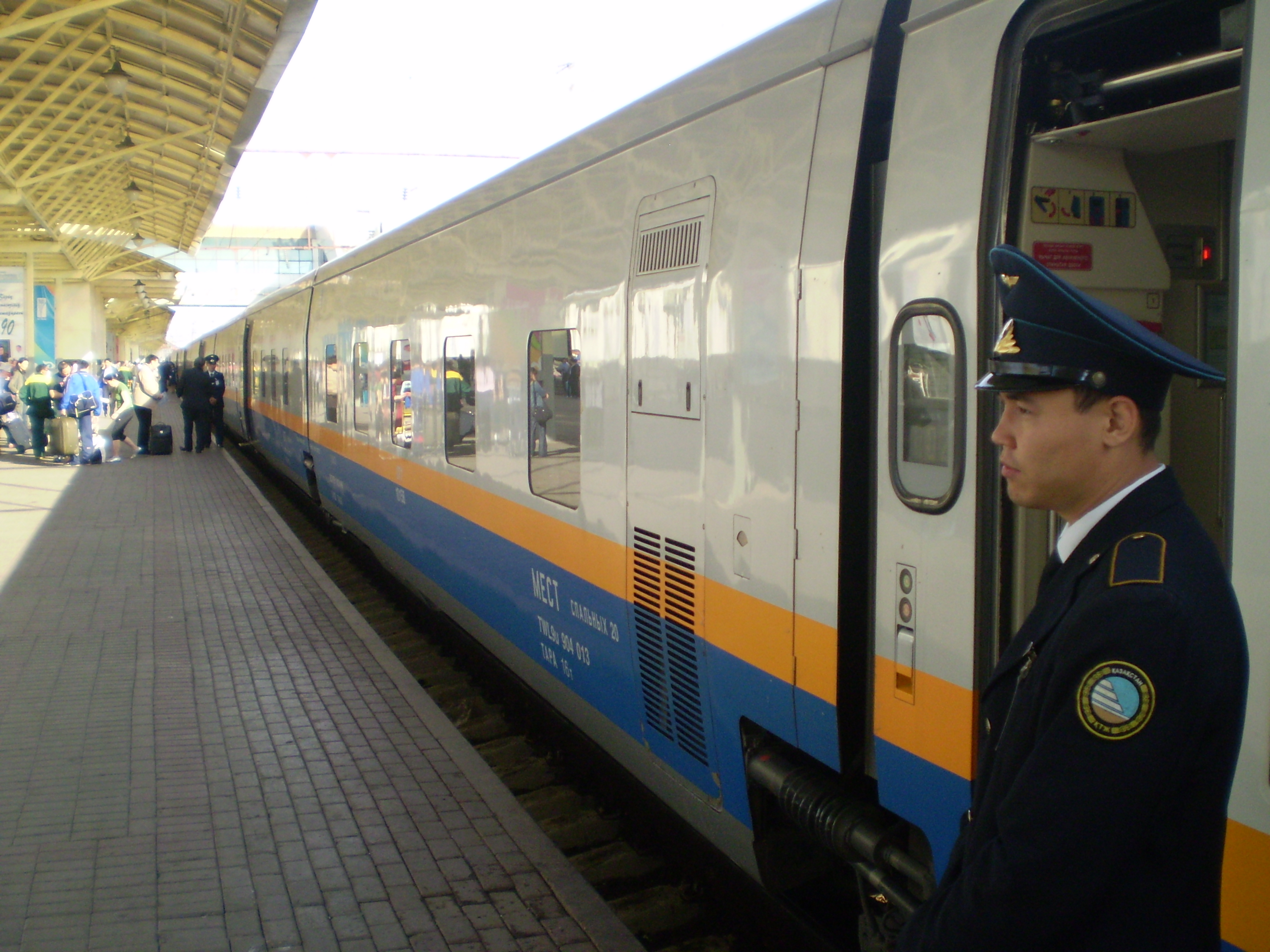
Tulpar Talgo express train to Almaty.

As of 2020, no operational high-speed rail systems exist in Kazakhstan. Two links are planned – between Almaty and Astana, and an international link between Moscow and Beijing that would go through the country.

== Astana–Almaty ==
In November 2013 the proposed Astana (then Nur-Sultan)–Almaty high speed railway was postponed due to high costs and doubts over passenger numbers.

Previously in March 2013, Qazaqstan Temir Zholy, the national rail company of Kazakhstan, awarded a contract to Systra to oversee the design and construction of a high-speed line from Astana, the country's capital, to Almaty, its largest city. The line was expected to be 1,011 km (628 mi) long, and was supposed to travel via Karaganda and Balkhash. A 10 km (6.2 mi) viaduct across Lake Balkhash was planned near Sayaq. The trains were expected to be built by Tulpar-Talgo (a joint venture established in 2011 between Qazaqstan Temir Zholy and Spanish company Talgo), with a maximum speed of 250 km/h (155 mph), completing the trip in five and a half hours. The system would use Russian gauge, the same as used by Kazakhstan's existing conventional lines.

== Moscow–Beijing via Kazakhstan ==
In 2015, a Russian Railways official said that the Moscow-Beijing HSR line would pass through either Russia's Altai Republic or Kazakhstan. The difference in length between the two proposed routes would be 290 km (180 miles).

== Tashkent-Turkistan ==
In 2021, the Kazakh Prime Minister Asqar Mamin announced plans to extend the high-speed rail line terminating in Tashkent, Uzbekistan across the border to Shymkent and Turkistan.
