= Rift lake =

Lake formed as a result of subsidence related to movement on faults within a rift zone

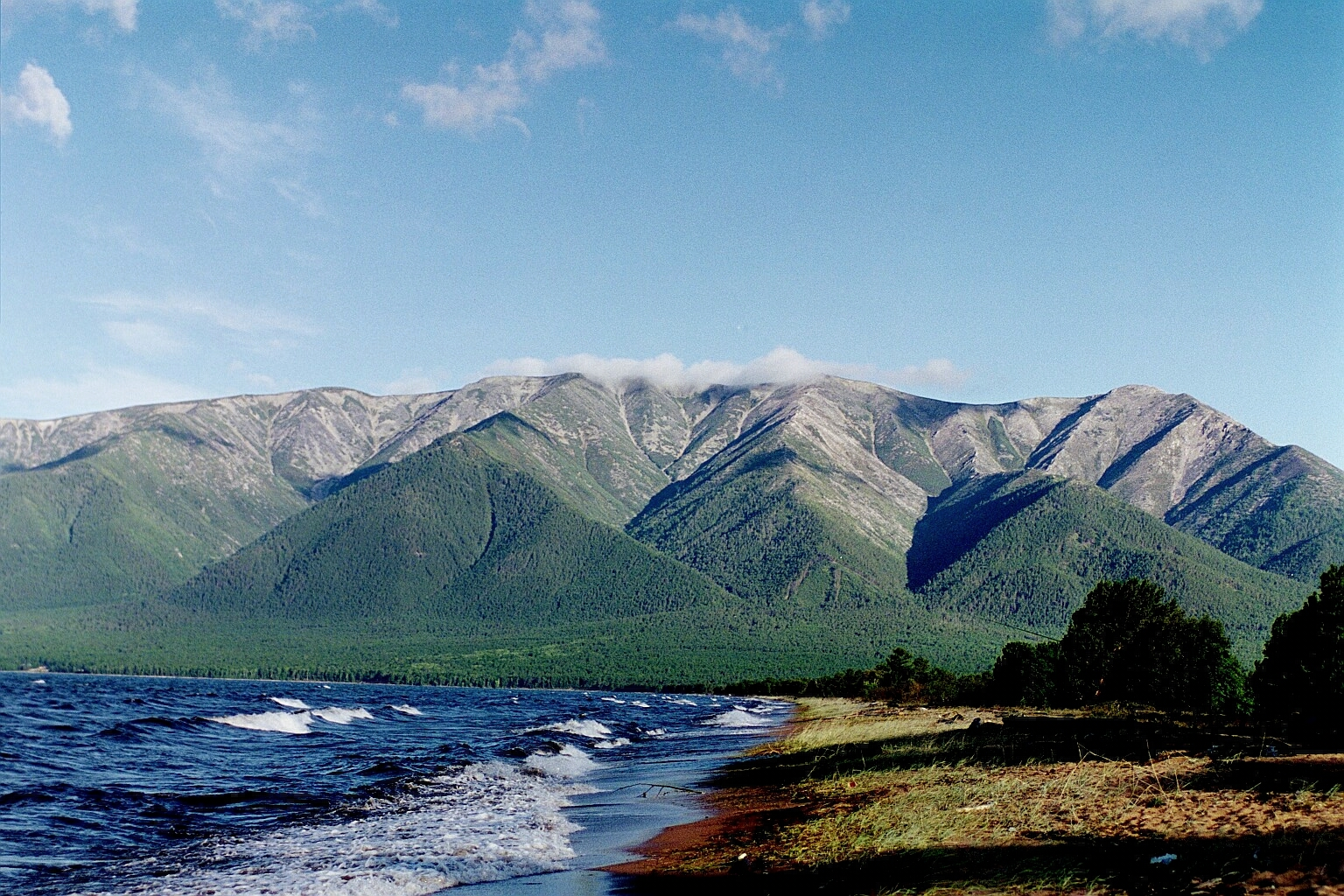
Faulted southeastern side of Svyatoy Nos peninsula, Lake Baikal – active faulting shown by faceted spurs.

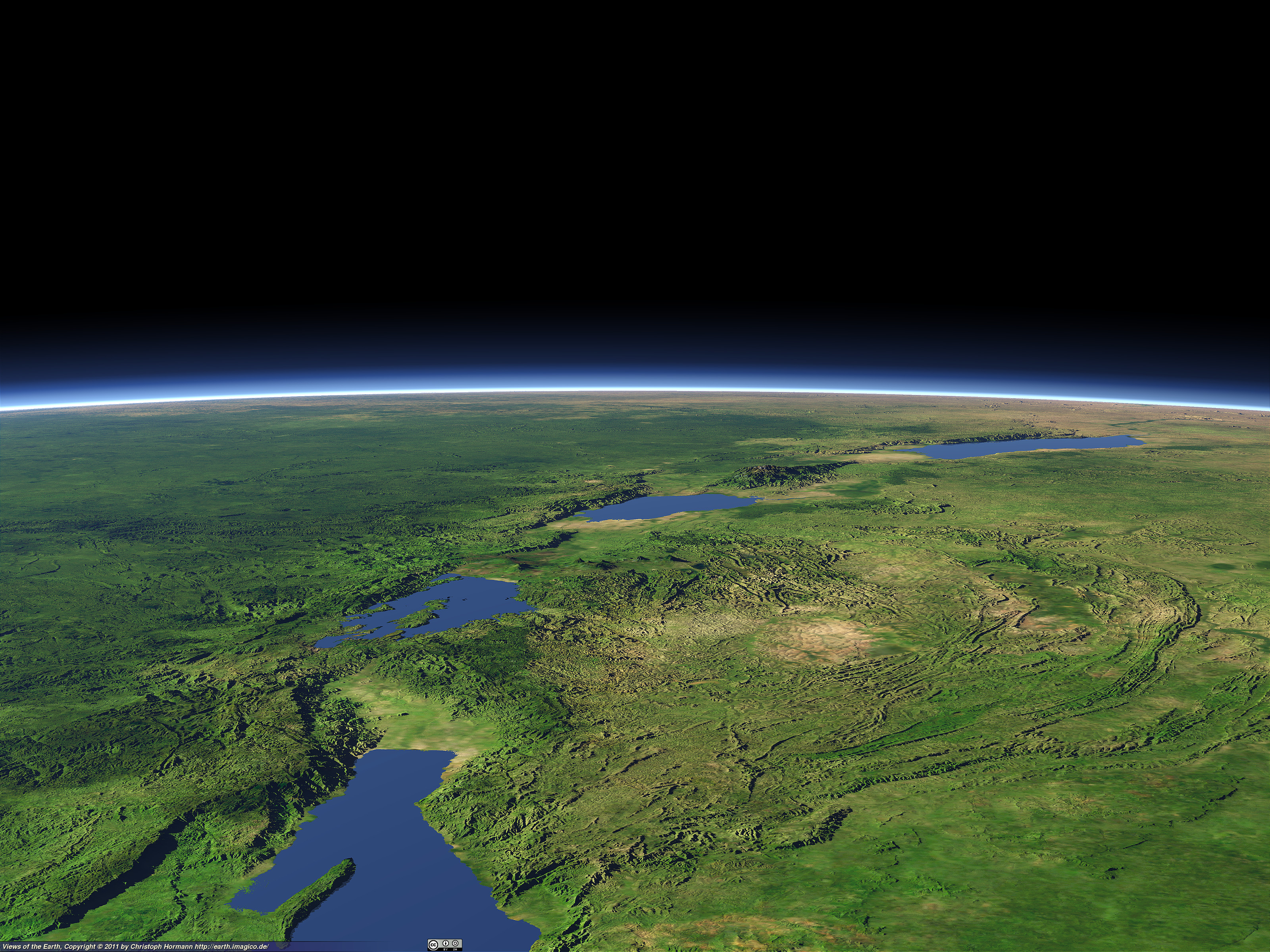
Artificial rendering of the Albertine Rift showing four of its rift lakes

A rift lake is a lake formed as a result of subsidence related to movement on faults within a rift zone, an area of extensional tectonics in the continental crust. They are often found within rift valleys and may be very deep. Rift lakes may be bounded by large steep cliffs along the fault margins. Rift lakes can host a variety of life forms, and can be valuable for core sampling.

== Examples ==
- Lake Baikal, in Siberia
- Lake Balaton, in Hungary
- The Dead Sea, on the border of Israel, Palestine and Jordan, a pull-apart basin, formed along the Dead Sea Transform.
- Ebi Lake in China at the Dzungarian Gate on the border with Kazakhstan
- Lake Elsinore, in the Elsinore Trough in Southern California
- Lake Hazar, in Turkey
- Lake Idaho, a Pliocene rift lake in Idaho
- Lake Khuvsgul, northern Mongolia
- Limagne, an infilled Paleogene rift lake in France
- Lake Lockatong, a rift lake of Triassic age, formed in the Newark Basin.
- Lake Malawi, part of East African Rift
- The Orcadian Basin, in northern Scotland, had rift lakes that formed during the Middle Devonian.
- Rift Valley lakes, eastern Africa
- Lake Tanganyika, part of Albertine Rift
- Lake Vostok, in Antarctica, may have formed in a rift setting
- Þingvallavatn, in Iceland
