= Alashankou railway station =

Railway station in China

Alashankou 阿拉山口
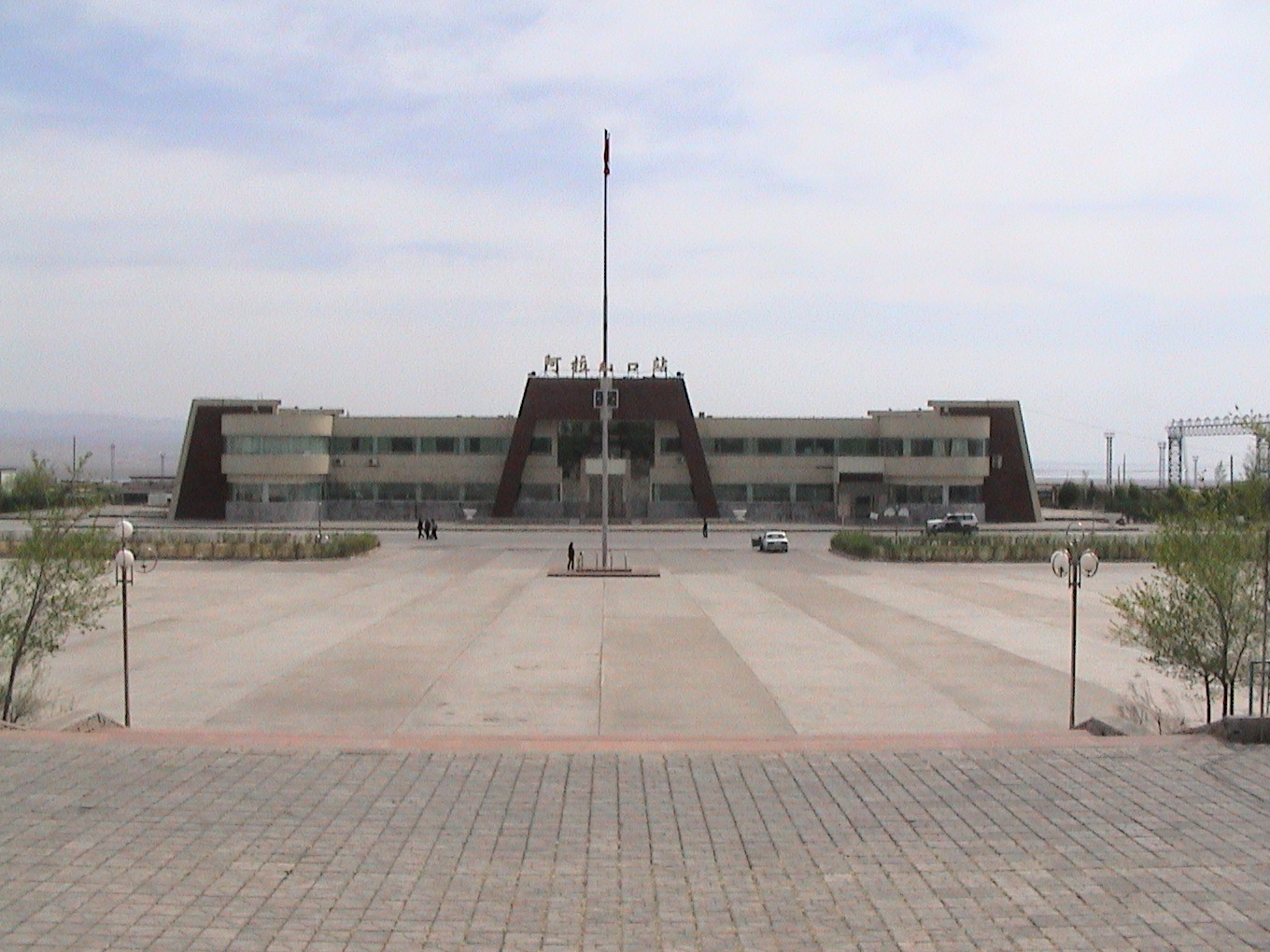
- View of the station from the outside in 2006

General information
- Location: Alashankou; China
- Coordinates: 45°10′13″N 82°34′13″E
- Line: Lanxin Railway Northern Xinjiang branch

Services
Preceding station	China Railway	Following station
Wulandabusen towards Ürümqi	Northern Xinjiang railway	Dostyk in Kazakhstan towards Aktogay
Location

Alashankou railway station (Chinese: 阿拉山口站; pinyin: Ālāshānkǒu zhàn), also known as Alataw Pass railway station (also spelt Alatau and Ala Tau), is a railway station in Börtala Mongol Autonomous Prefecture of China's Xinjiang Uyghur Autonomous Region.

Located on the Chinese side of the Dzungarian Gate pass through the Dzungarian Alatau mountain range at the 2358.376 km point of Lanxin Railway, it is the last station on the Northern Xinjiang branch of the Lanxin Railway before entering Kazakhstan onto the Turkestan-Siberian Railway.

On 12 September 1992, the line was extended across the border into the former Soviet Union to Dostyk railway station. Originally, when opening, the station was under the jurisdiction of the Northern Xinjiang Railway Company, before being transferred to the Northern Xinjiang Railway Company in 2001, then to the China Railway Ürümqi Group in 2005.

For the first twenty-plus years of its history, it was the only railway port of entry in Western China; during this time, the amount of international rail freight going through the Alashankou port of entry increased from 160,000 tonnes in 1991 to 15,160,000 tonnes in 2011.

In another report, the tonnes of rail freight crossing the border at Alashankou during the first 10 months of 2011 were reported as 8,921,000, which was said to be a 12.8% increase over the previous year. The mass of traffic of going from Kazakhstan to China is much higher than from China to Kazakhstan (7,412,000 tonnes vs. 1,509,000 tonnes). The main commodities that went from Kazakhstan to China via Alashankou were iron ore, high-carbon ferrochrome, wheat and steel. Among the goods shipped from China to Kazakhstan, the main groups were steel (in particular, steel pipes), electronics and tomato paste.

There is also a passenger train, Almaty-Ürümqi, that crosses the border at Alashankou. The second railway port of entry on the Sino-Kazakh border, at Khorgas, opened to rail traffic in December 2012.

== See also ==
- Ürümqi railway station
