= A14 =

A14 may refer to:

== Life sciences ==
- ATC code A14 Anabolic agents for systemic use, a subgroup of the ATC Classification System
- British NVC community A14 (Myriophyllum alterniflorum community), a British Isles plant community
- Subfamily A14, a rhodopsin-like receptors subfamily

== Transport ==
- List of A14 roads
- Aero A.14, a Czech reconnaissance aircraft built after World War I
- Curtiss XA-14 Shrike, a 1930s-era ground-attack airplane
- HMNZS Resolution (A14), a 1989 hydrographic ship of the Royal New Zealand Navy
- HMS A.14, an alternate name for HMS B1, a submarine of the British Royal Navy
- Fiat A.14, a 1917 Italian 12-cylinder, liquid-cooled, V aero engine
- Nissan A14, a 1975–2008 car engine

== Other uses ==
- English Opening, Encyclopaedia of Chess Openings code
- Apple A14 Bionic processor, used in some iPads and iPhones
- Samsung Galaxy A14, an Android smartphone series by Samsung Electronics
