= List of A14 roads =

This is a list of roads designated A14.

- A014 road (Argentina), a beltway ring-road around San Juan, San Juan Province
- A14 motorway (Austria), a road connecting Hörbranz and the German Autobahn 96 to Bürs
- A14 motorway (Belgium), a road connecting Antwerp and France at Lille
- A14 motorway (France), a road connecting La Défense, Hauts-de-Seine and Orgeval, Yvelines
- A 14 motorway (Germany), a road in eastern Germany
- A14 motorway (Italy), a road connecting Bologna to Taranto
- A14 road (Kenya), a road connecting Mombasa to the Tanzanian border
- A14 road (Latvia), a road connecting Tilti - Daugavpils - Kalkūni
- A14 highway (Lithuania), a road connecting Vilnius and Utena
- A14 motorway (Portugal), connecting Coimbra and Figueira da Foz
- A 14 highway (Sri Lanka), a road connecting Medawachchiya and Talaimannar
- A14 motorway (Switzerland), a road connecting Luzern and Cham
- A14 road (England), a road connecting the Port of Felixstowe to the junction of the M1 and M6 motorways near Rugby
- A14 road (Isle of Man), a road connecting Jurby to Sulby Road
- A14 road (United States of America) may refer to:
  - County Route A14 (California), a road in Plumas County connecting SR 89 and Johnsville

== See also ==
- list of highways numbered 14
