= G3021 Lintong–Xingping Expressway =

Road in Shaanxi, China

Lintong–Xingping Expressway
- 临潼－兴平高速公路
- Linxing Expressway 临兴高速公路

Route information
- Auxiliary route of G30
- Length: 122.6 km (76.2 mi)

Major junctions
- West end: G5 / Shaanxi S02 in Huyi District, Xi'an, Shaanxi
- East end: G30 in Lintong District, Xi'an, Shaanxi

Location
- Country: China

Highway system
- National Trunk Highway System; Primary; Auxiliary; National Highways; Transport in China
← G3019	→ G3031

The G3021 Lintong–Xingping Expressway (Chinese: 临潼至兴平高速公路), commonly referred to as the Linxing Expressway (Chinese: 临兴高速公路), is an expressway in Shaanxi, China that connects the cities of Lintong and Xingping.

== Route ==
The expressway passes through Lintong, Sanyuan, Jingyang, Xingping and Huyi, with a total length of 122.6 kilometers, of which 9 kilometers from Xiwu Interchange to Fengwei Interchange are shared with the G30 Lianyungang–Khorgas Expressway. It was completed and opened to traffic on 8 December 2015.
