= Ebi Lake =

Lake in China

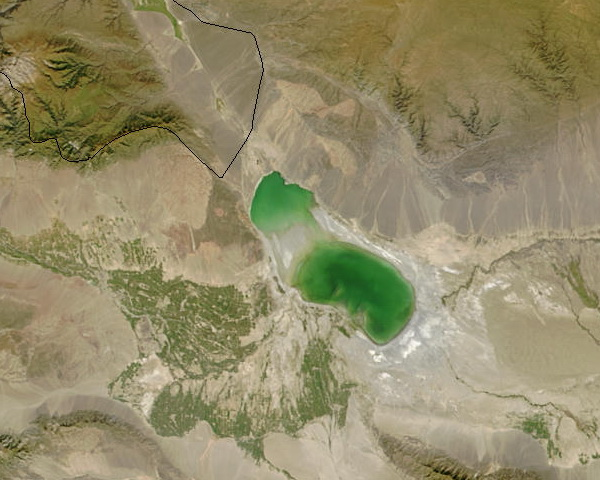
- Satellite image of Aibi Lake

- Location within Dzungaria
- Location: Börtala, Xinjiang, China
- Coordinates: 44°53′N 83°00′E
- Type: Rift lake
- Primary inflows: Kuitun River, Bortala River, Jinghe River (intermittent)
- Primary outflows: None
- Basin countries: China
- Surface area: 805 km^{2} (311 sq mi) (2018)
- Average depth: 1.4 m (4 ft 7 in)
- Max. depth: 2.8 m (9 ft 2 in)
- Water volume: 760 million cubic metres (620,000 acre⋅ft)
- Surface elevation: 189 m (620 ft)

Ebi Lake (Note: Mongolian: Эв нуур / ᠡᠪ ᠨᠠᠭᠤᠷ, romanized: Ew nuur, pronounced [iw̜ ˈno̙ːr̥], Middle Mongol: /ˈe.bi/; Kazakh: Ебінұр (Қызылтұз), romanized: Ebınūr (Qyzyltūz), pronounced [je̘ˌb̥ɘˈno̙r (qəˌzəɫˈtʰo̙s)]; Chinese: 艾比湖; pinyin: Àibǐ Hú) is a rift lake in Xinjiang Uyghur Autonomous Region in northwestern China, near the border of Kazakhstan. Lying at the southeast end of the Dzungarian Gate, Ebi Lake is the center of the catchment of the southwestern part of the Dzungarian Basin. The lake previously covered 1200 km^{2} (400 sq mi), which is now down to under 1000 km^{2} with an average depth of less than 2 meters (6.5 feet).

The high salt concentration (87 g/L) of its water prevents plants and fish from living in the actual lake, though many kinds of fish do live in the mouths of its source rivers.

In 2007, the lake had a surface area of only 500 km^{2}.

The Aibi Lake Wetland Nature Reserve was created by 2007.
