= List of highways numbered 14A =

The following highways are numbered 14A:

== United States ==
- Connecticut Route 14A
- Delaware Route 14A (former)
- Florida State Road 14A (former)
- Nebraska Spur 14A
- New York State Route 14A
  - County Route 14A (Cattaraugus County, New York)
- Ohio State Route 14A
- Secondary State Highway 14A (Washington) (former)

Territories

- Guam Highway 14A

== See also ==
- List of highways numbered 14
