= Ayagoz District =

Coordinates: 47°57′57″N 80°25′52″E

Ayagoz Aiaköz audany
- District
- Аякөз ауданы
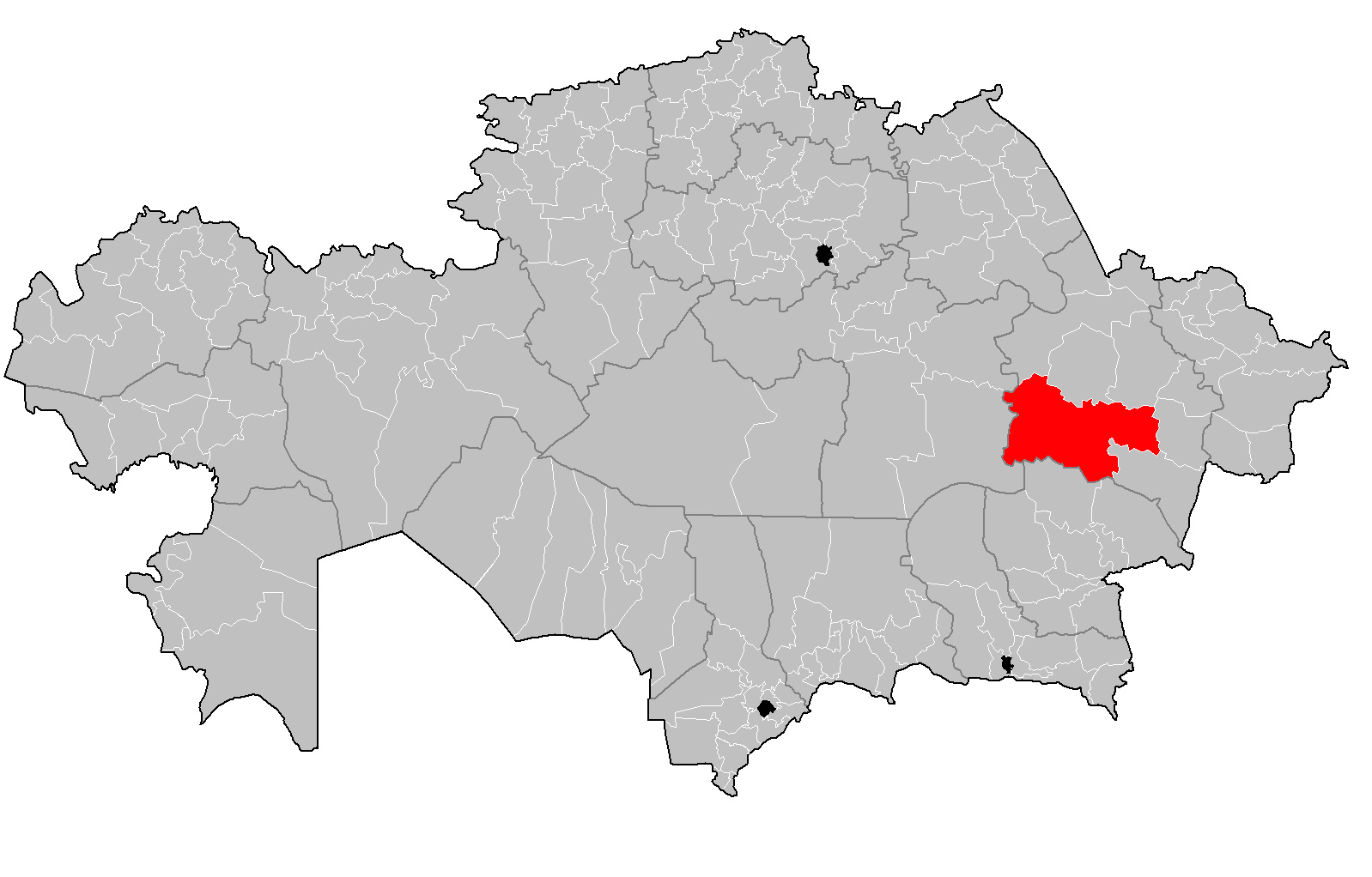
- Country: Kazakhstan
- Region: Abai Region
- Administrative center: Ayagoz
- Founded: 1928

Government
  - Akim: Kanat Adilbayev

Area
  - Total: 19,146 sq mi (49,588 km^{2})

Population (2013)
  - Total: 35,866
- Time zone: UTC+6 (East)

Ayagoz (Kazakh: Аякөз ауданы, Aiaköz audany; اياكٶز اۋدانى) is a district of Abai Region in eastern Kazakhstan. The administrative center of the district is the town of Ayagoz. Population: 35,866 (2013 estimate); 36,410 (2009 census results); 42,797 (1999 census results).

The district is served by Turkestan-Siberia Railway. Aktogay station, located within the district, is an important junction.
