= Sayaq =

Town in Karaganda Region, Kazakhstan

Coordinates: 47°00′00″N 77°24′00″E

Sayaq is a town in Karaganda Region in eastern Kazakhstan.

== Transport ==
It is the terminus of a branch of the national railway system.

== Climate ==
Climate data for Sayaq (1991–2020)
Month	Jan	Feb	Mar	Apr	May	Jun	Jul	Aug	Sep	Oct	Nov	Dec	Year
Mean daily maximum °C (°F)	−6.9 (19.6)	−4.3 (24.3)	5.4 (41.7)	17.8 (64.0)	24.9 (76.8)	30.5 (86.9)	31.8 (89.2)	30.6 (87.1)	23.7 (74.7)	14.8 (58.6)	4.1 (39.4)	−4.0 (24.8)	14.0 (57.2)
Daily mean °C (°F)	−11.6 (11.1)	−9.3 (15.3)	−0.3 (31.5)	10.8 (51.4)	17.4 (63.3)	23.4 (74.1)	24.9 (76.8)	23.4 (74.1)	16.5 (61.7)	8.1 (46.6)	−1.1 (30.0)	−8.6 (16.5)	7.8 (46.0)
Mean daily minimum °C (°F)	−15.8 (3.6)	−13.7 (7.3)	−4.8 (23.4)	4.4 (39.9)	10.3 (50.5)	16.4 (61.5)	18.0 (64.4)	16.4 (61.5)	9.8 (49.6)	2.7 (36.9)	−5.0 (23.0)	−12.5 (9.5)	2.2 (36.0)
Average precipitation mm (inches)	10.6 (0.42)	10.4 (0.41)	9.3 (0.37)	7.7 (0.30)	9.2 (0.36)	14.0 (0.55)	18.4 (0.72)	8.3 (0.33)	3.9 (0.15)	11.9 (0.47)	13.6 (0.54)	12.7 (0.50)	130.0 (5.12)
Average precipitation days (≥ 1.0 mm)	3.6	3.0	2.5	2.0	2.3	2.9	3.2	1.9	1.2	2.7	3.9	4.2	33.4
Source: NOAA

== See also ==
- Railway stations in Kazakhstan
