= Todok =

Town in China

Coordinates: 44°32′15″N 83°33′48″E

Todok or Todog, known in Chinese as Tuotuo Township (Chinese: 托托乡; pinyin: Tuōtuōxiāng), is a rural township in Jinghe County in Xinjiang, the northwestern province of the China.

In the early 19th century, it was recorded as the northwestern boundary of the sandy desert in Xinjiang.
