= Alakol District =

Coordinates: 44°13′48″N 76°51′00″E

Alakol
- District
- Алакөл ауданы
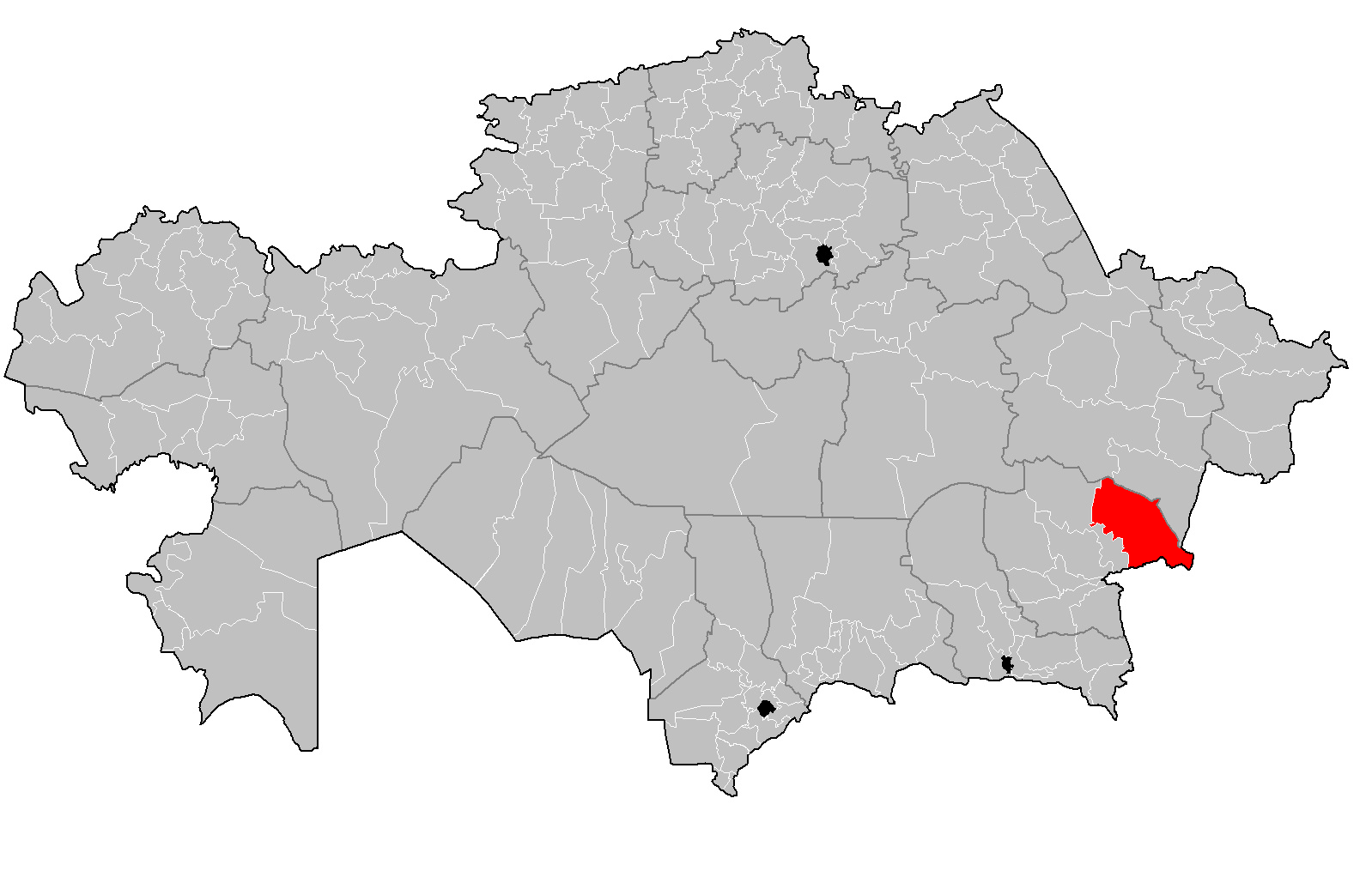
- Country: Kazakhstan
- Region: Jetisu Region
- Administrative center: Üşaral
- Founded: 1928

Government
  - Akim (mayor): Abdinov Almas Sapargalievich

Area
  - Total: 9,200 sq mi (23,700 km^{2})

Population (2013)
  - Total: 70,427
- Time zone: UTC+6 (East)

Alakol District (Kazakh: Алакөл ауданы, Alaköl audany) is a district of Jetisu Region in Kazakhstan. The administrative center of the district is the town of Üşaral. Population: 70,427 (2013 estimate); 69,398 (2009 census results); 79,773 (1999 census results).

The Tunkuruz Hydroelectric Power Plant is located in the district.

== Geography ==
The district is located in the Balkhash-Alakol Depression. Parts of its eastern border (where the district borders on Abai Region) run through the chain of lakes - Lakes Sasykkol, Koshkarkol, Alakol, and Zhalanashkol. There are no major rivers in the district; the fairly small Tentek River, which flows toward Lake Sasykkol, but reaches it only intermittently, is the largest one.
