= Beskol =

- Village
- Location in Kazakhstan
- Coordinates: 46°10′31″N 81°5′56″E
- Country: Kazakhstan
- Region: Jetisu Region

Population (2011)
  - Total: 4,000
- Time zone: UTC+6 (Omsk Time)

Beskol (Kazakh: Бескөл, Besköl) is a village in Jetisu Region of south-eastern Kazakhstan.

Beskol, which means Five Lakes in Kazakh, has a roughly 50% Russian, 50% Kazakh mix.

The primary employer is the railway station, which is important both as a passenger and freight stop – trains travel through here to both Almaty and Astana, and west to Urumqi in China. There is also a fish canning factory, mostly known for its noxious smell.

The largest building in Beskol is the school, which in 2011 celebrated its 50th anniversary, and the two-story building is one of the only ones in town, with most buildings being bungalows - the predominant design in rural Kazakhstan.

Just outside before reaching the Beskol sign, is the Zerat cemetery, which is the Muslim cemetery for Beskol and the other villages in the area; Sakhsavode, Bulakta, Zagatzerno and Sveklabaza.

There is a small Russian Orthodox Cemetery behind Sakhsavode.

The Kazakhstan-China Oil pipeline will pass behind Beskol, with work clearly taking place.

Beskol lies at the feet of the northern end of Zhungar Alatau mountain range, a formerly contentious border zone with China that requires special permits to explore properly.

There is currently a Peace Corps education volunteer in Beskol.

== Notable residents ==
Askhat Zhitkeyev, judoka, 2008 Olympic silver medalist
