= Alashankou =

Alashankou 阿拉山口市 (Chinese) ئالاتاۋ ئېغىزى (Uyghur) ᠠᠯᠠᠭ ᠠᠭᠤᠯᠠ ᠬᠣᠲᠠ (Mongolian)
- County-level city
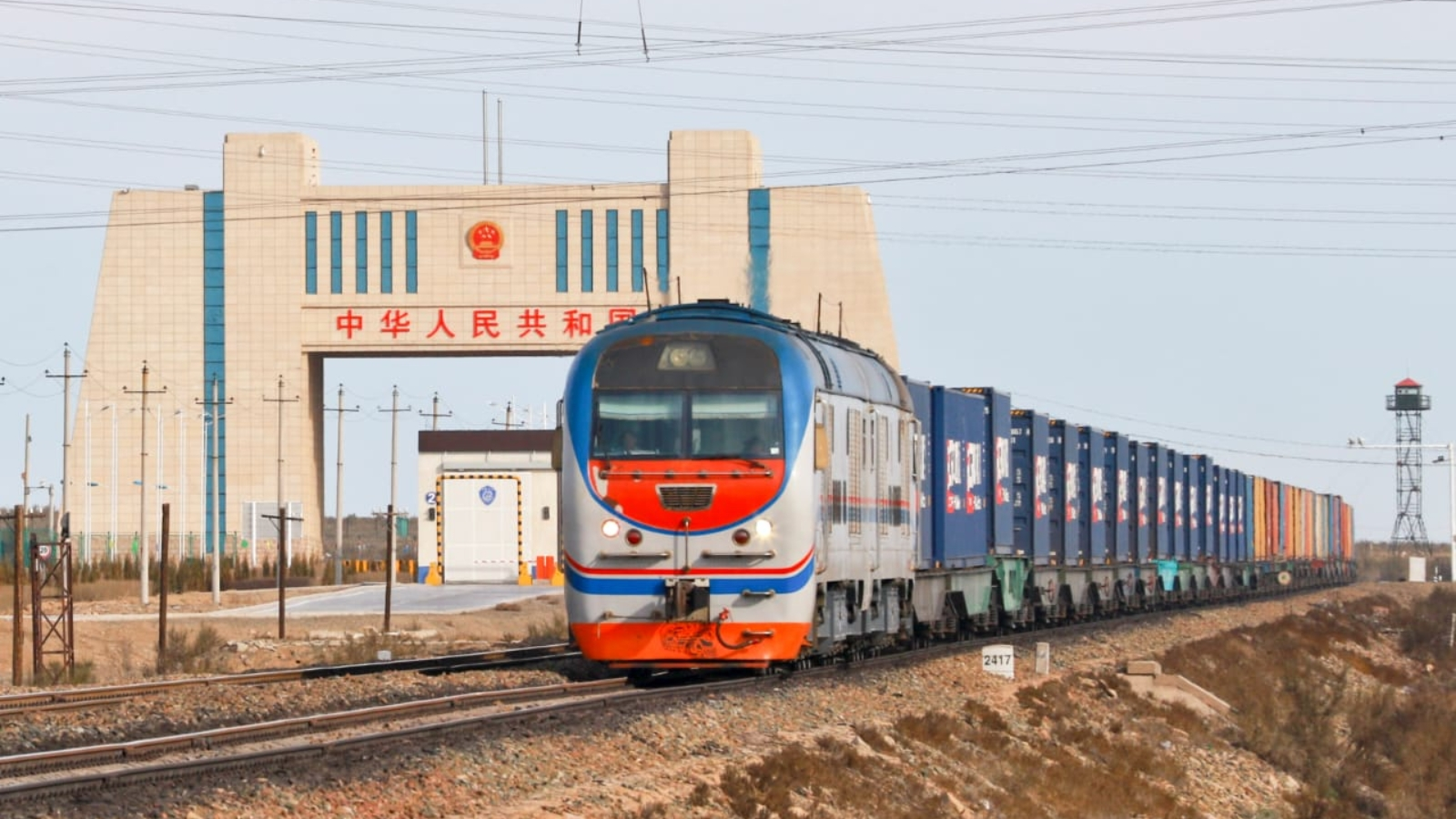
- Freight train arriving at Alashankou railway station

- Location in Xinjiang Alashankou (Xinjiang) Alashankou (China)
- Coordinates: 45°10′24″N 82°33′17″E
- Country: China
- Autonomous region: Xinjiang
- Autonomous prefecture: Bortala
- Municipal seat: Alataw Subdistrict

Area
  - Total: 1,204 km^{2} (465 sq mi)

Population (2020)
  - Total: 11,097
  - Density: 9.217/km^{2} (23.87/sq mi)
- Time zone: UTC+8 (China Standard Time (Note: Locals in Xinjiang frequently observe UTC+6 (Xinjiang Time), 2 hours behind Beijing.))
- Website: www.alsk.gov.cn

Alashankou

Chinese name
- Chinese: 阿拉山口市
Transcriptions
Standard Mandarin
- Hanyu Pinyin: Ālāshānkǒu shì

Alternative Chinese name
- Chinese: 阿拉套阿格兹
Transcriptions
Standard Mandarin
- Hanyu Pinyin: Ālātào'āgézī

Mongolian name
- Mongolian Cyrillic: Алаг уул хот
- Mongolian script: ᠠᠯᠠᠭ ᠠᠭᠤᠯᠠ ᠬᠣᠲᠠ

Uyghur name
- Uyghur: ئالاتاۋ ئېغىزى شەھىرى or ئالاتاۋ ئېغىزى
- Literal meaning: Alatau Pass
Transcriptions
- Latin Yëziqi: Alataw ëghizi shehiri / Alataw shehiri
- Yengi Yeziⱪ: Alataw eƣizi xəⱨiri / Alataw xəⱨiri
- SASM/GNC: Alataw egizi xäĥiri / Alataw xäĥiri
- Siril Yëziqi: Алатавеғизи шәһири / Алатав шәһири

Kazakh name
- Kazakh: الاتاۋ ساعاسى قالاسى or الاتاۋ قالاسى

Alashankou (Chinese: 阿拉山口) is a border city in Bortala Mongol Autonomous Prefecture, Xinjiang Uyghur Autonomous Region, China. It is a port of entry by both railroad and highway from Kazakhstan as part of the Eurasian Land Bridge.

== Overview ==
The city is located at the Dzungarian Gate (Alashankou in Chinese), a pass connecting the two countries through the Dzungarian Alatau mountains. West of the pass, the port of entry on the Kazakhstan side is Dostyk. Alashankou is 73 kilometers (45 mi) from Bole, 460 kilometers (290 mi) from Ürümqi, and 580 kilometers (360 mi) from Almaty. The weather in Alashankou is harsh.

Alashankou is one of China's national first-class ports of entry. The volume of imports and exports passing through Alashankou accounts for 90% of the total for all of Xinjiang. Since 2010, it has surpassed Manzhouli, Inner Mongolia to become the busiest land port-of-entry in China.

Formerly a township-level port commission under the administration of Bole City, Alashankou was upgraded to a county-level city in December 2012. The city governs an area of 1,204 square kilometres (465 sq mi), including 12 square kilometres (4.6 sq mi) of built-up area, which is divided into Alatao and Aibihu subdistricts. It has a permanent population of 10,000 and a floating population of 30,000.

== Transport ==
The agreement between the Soviet Union and the China to connect Kazakhstan with Western China by rail was achieved in 1954. On the Soviet side, the railway reached the border town of Druzhba (Dostyk) in 1959. On the Chinese side, however, the westward construction of the Lanzhou-Xinjiang railway was stopped once it reached Ürümqi in 1962. Due to the Sino-Soviet split, the railway link was not completed until September 12, 1990. The highway port of entry was opened in December 1995.

The railway networks of the two countries use different gauges (China, like most of Europe, uses the standard gauge of 1,435 mm (4 ft 8 1/2 in), but Kazakhstan uses the broader gauge of 1,520 mm (4 ft 11 27/32 in) Russian gauge), so there are breaks of gauge. It is proposed to build a standard gauge transcontinental railway to link Europe and China to bypass these two breaks of gauge. This project was signed in 2004.

On July 10, 2010, Bole Alashankou Airport was opened with scheduled flights to Ürümqi.

Alashankou has again become a major transportation hub due to freight associated with the Belt and Road Initiative's Eurasian Land Bridge Economic Corridor.

== Administrative divisions ==
Alashankou is made up of 1 subdistrict and 1 town.

Name	Simplified Chinese	Hanyu Pinyin	Uyghur (UEY)	Uyghur Latin (ULY)	Mongolian (traditional)	Mongolian (Cyrillic)	Administrative division code
Subdistrict
Alataw Subdistrict	阿拉套街道	Ālātào Jiēdào	ئالاتاۋ كوچا باشقارمىسى	Alataw kocha bashqarmisi	ᠠᠯᠠᠭ ᠠᠭᠤᠯᠠ ᠵᠡᠭᠡᠯᠢ ᠭᠤᠳᠤᠮᠵᠢ	Алаг уул зээл гудамж	652702001
Town
Ebinur Town	艾比湖镇	Àibǐhú Zhèn	ئېبنۇر كۆلى بازىرى	Ëbnur köli baziri	ᠡᠪᠢ ᠨᠠᠭᠤᠷ ᠪᠠᠯᠭᠠᠰᠤ	Эв нуур балгас	652702100

== Climate ==
Climate data for Alashankou, elevation 370 m (1,210 ft), (1991–2020 normals, extremes 1981–2010)
Month	Jan	Feb	Mar	Apr	May	Jun	Jul	Aug	Sep	Oct	Nov	Dec	Year
Record high °C (°F)	8.3 (46.9)	8.8 (47.8)	23.5 (74.3)	36.2 (97.2)	40.2 (104.4)	41.8 (107.2)	44.1 (111.4)	42.3 (108.1)	39.1 (102.4)	30.7 (87.3)	19.5 (67.1)	10.9 (51.6)	44.1 (111.4)
Mean daily maximum °C (°F)	−12.0 (10.4)	−6.1 (21.0)	6.6 (43.9)	19.8 (67.6)	26.6 (79.9)	32.2 (90.0)	34.2 (93.6)	32.5 (90.5)	25.5 (77.9)	15.5 (59.9)	3.9 (39.0)	−7.2 (19.0)	14.3 (57.7)
Daily mean °C (°F)	−15.5 (4.1)	−10.1 (13.8)	1.9 (35.4)	13.9 (57.0)	20.5 (68.9)	26.1 (79.0)	27.9 (82.2)	26.3 (79.3)	19.8 (67.6)	10.7 (51.3)	0.3 (32.5)	−10.3 (13.5)	9.3 (48.7)
Mean daily minimum °C (°F)	−18.2 (−0.8)	−13.4 (7.9)	−2.1 (28.2)	8.8 (47.8)	15.0 (59.0)	20.5 (68.9)	22.4 (72.3)	20.8 (69.4)	14.7 (58.5)	6.5 (43.7)	−2.6 (27.3)	−12.6 (9.3)	5.0 (41.0)
Record low °C (°F)	−31.4 (−24.5)	−30.5 (−22.9)	−25.3 (−13.5)	−10.6 (12.9)	1.9 (35.4)	8.8 (47.8)	12.7 (54.9)	9.1 (48.4)	1.5 (34.7)	−7.8 (18.0)	−28.0 (−18.4)	−31.9 (−25.4)	−31.9 (−25.4)
Average precipitation mm (inches)	5.8 (0.23)	4.2 (0.17)	4.2 (0.17)	10.1 (0.40)	18.8 (0.74)	15.6 (0.61)	20.7 (0.81)	16.5 (0.65)	11.8 (0.46)	8.8 (0.35)	4.9 (0.19)	8.1 (0.32)	129.5 (5.1)
Average precipitation days (≥ 0.1 mm)	10.5	7.3	3.6	4.8	6.3	6.8	8.8	7.0	5.1	4.0	5.2	12.0	81.4
Average snowy days	21.2	16.7	6.1	0.8	0	0	0	0	0	0.9	7.6	21.5	74.8
Average relative humidity (%)	80	77	63	42	35	34	36	36	39	52	70	81	54
Mean monthly sunshine hours	108.3	130.8	192.1	251.8	299.2	294.0	300.8	296.6	259.8	204.2	113.9	73.7	2,525.2
Percentage possible sunshine	38	44	51	61	65	63	64	70	71	62	41	27	55
Source: China Meteorological Administration

== See also ==
- Alashankou railway station
- Lake Alakol
