= Usharal =

Usharal Үшарал
- Town
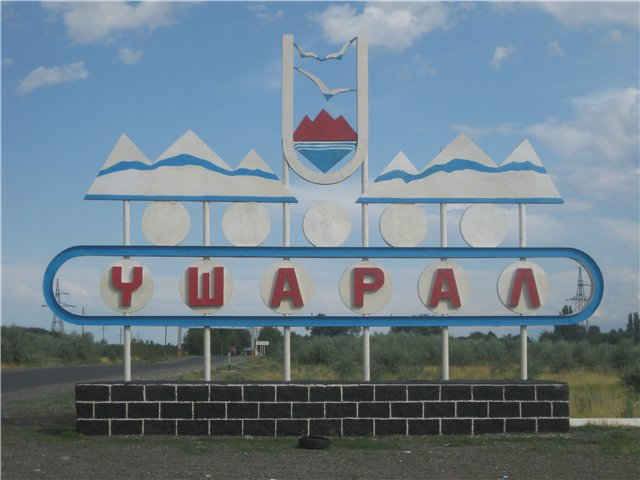
- Entrance Sign to the town.

- Location in Kazakhstan
- Coordinates: 46°10′11″N 80°56′22″E
- Country: Kazakhstan
- Region: Jetisu Region
- District: Alakol District

Population (2009)
  - Total: 15,991
- Time zone: UTC+05:00 (Kazakhstan Time)
- Postal code: 040200
- Area code: 72833

Usharal or Üşaral (Kazakh: Үшарал, Üşaral; Russian: Ушарал) is a town in the Alakol District of Jetisu Region in south-eastern Kazakhstan. It is the capital of the district. Population: 15,991 (2009 census results); 15,379 (1999 census results).

== Climate ==
Usharal has a Mediterranean-influenced hot-summer humid continental climate (Dsa) according to the Köppen climate classification.

Climate data for Usharal (1991–2020, extremes 1934–present)
| Month | Jan | Feb | Mar | Apr | May | Jun | Jul | Aug | Sep | Oct | Nov | Dec | Year |
|---|---|---|---|---|---|---|---|---|---|---|---|---|---|
| Record high °C (°F) | 14.5 (58.1) | 13.5 (56.3) | 26.2 (79.2) | 36.4 (97.5) | 38.2 (100.8) | 39.9 (103.8) | 41.8 (107.2) | 43.6 (110.5) | 40.2 (104.4) | 31.4 (88.5) | 24.8 (76.6) | 14.4 (57.9) | 43.6 (110.5) |
| Mean daily maximum °C (°F) | −7.0 (19.4) | −3.8 (25.2) | 5.3 (41.5) | 18.2 (64.8) | 24.3 (75.7) | 29.9 (85.8) | 31.8 (89.2) | 30.7 (87.3) | 24.9 (76.8) | 16.4 (61.5) | 5.7 (42.3) | −2.9 (26.8) | 14.5 (58.1) |
| Daily mean °C (°F) | −12.3 (9.9) | −9.4 (15.1) | −0.3 (31.5) | 11.0 (51.8) | 17.0 (62.6) | 22.6 (72.7) | 24.4 (75.9) | 22.7 (72.9) | 16.7 (62.1) | 8.8 (47.8) | 0.0 (32.0) | −7.4 (18.7) | 7.8 (46.0) |
| Mean daily minimum °C (°F) | −17.5 (0.5) | −14.7 (5.5) | −5.5 (22.1) | 3.8 (38.8) | 9.3 (48.7) | 14.8 (58.6) | 16.8 (62.2) | 14.7 (58.5) | 8.7 (47.7) | 2.2 (36.0) | −4.7 (23.5) | −11.8 (10.8) | 1.3 (34.3) |
| Record low °C (°F) | −43.0 (−45.4) | −43.7 (−46.7) | −32.2 (−26.0) | −14.8 (5.4) | −3.7 (25.3) | 1.4 (34.5) | 7.8 (46.0) | −0.8 (30.6) | −5.5 (22.1) | −16.5 (2.3) | −35.8 (−32.4) | −43.0 (−45.4) | −43.7 (−46.7) |
| Average precipitation mm (inches) | 33.7 (1.33) | 24.8 (0.98) | 25.1 (0.99) | 30.5 (1.20) | 26.2 (1.03) | 26.8 (1.06) | 27.2 (1.07) | 16.5 (0.65) | 11.0 (0.43) | 24.5 (0.96) | 37.3 (1.47) | 38.6 (1.52) | 322.2 (12.69) |
| Average precipitation days (≥ 1.0 mm) | 7.0 | 5.7 | 5.8 | 5.6 | 5.2 | 4.8 | 5.0 | 3.0 | 2.3 | 4.7 | 6.7 | 7.2 | 63 |
| Mean monthly sunshine hours | 138 | 158 | 196 | 251 | 301 | 326 | 352 | 344 | 280 | 203 | 137 | 116 | 2,802 |
Source 1: Pogoda.ru.net
Source 2: NOAA (sun, 1961–1990)
