= Dostyk =

Settlement in Jetisu Region, Kazakhstan

Dostyk Достық Дружба (in Russian)
- settlement
- Location in Kazakhstan
- Coordinates: 45°15′12″N 82°29′04″E
- Country: Kazakhstan
- Region: Jetisu Region

Population (2009)
  - Total: 4,698
- Time zone: UTC+6 (Omsk Time)
- Postal code: 040212
- Area code: 72830

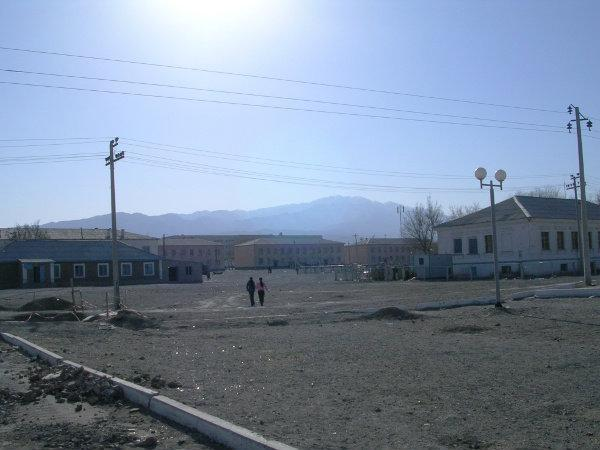
Dostyk Settlement

Dostyk (Kazakh: Достық, Dostyq) or Druzhba (Russian: Дружба) is a small town in Kazakhstan's Jetisu Region, on the border with Xinjiang, China. It is a port of entry (by highway and railroad) from China. The rail portion serves as an important link in the Eurasian Land Bridge. It is situated in the Dzungarian Gate, a historically significant mountain pass.

== Railways ==
The agreement between the Soviet Union and the PRC to connect Kazakhstan with Western China by rail was achieved in 1954. On the Soviet side, the railway reached the border town of Druzhba (Dostyk) (whose names, both Russian and Kazakh, mean 'friendship' in each respective language) in 1959. On the Chinese side, however, the westward construction of the Lanzhou-Xinjiang railway was stopped once it reached Urumqi in 1962. Due to the Sino-Soviet Split, the border town remained a sleepy backwater for some 30 years, until the railway link was finally completed on September 12, 1990.

The port of entry on the Chinese side is Alashankou.

There is a bogie exchange depot to facilitate the through movement of freight and passengers railcars.

== Uniform gauge ==
The railway networks of the two countries use different gauges (China, like most of Europe, uses the standard gauge of 1,435 mm (4 ft 8 1/2 in), but Kazakhstan uses the broader gauge of 1,520 mm (4 ft 11 27/32 in) Russian gauge), so there are breaks of gauge. It is proposed to build a standard gauge Trans-Asian Railway link between Europe and China to bypass these two breaks of gauge. This project was signed in 2004.

The other end of this proposed uniform gauge line is at Gorgan in Iran.

== See also ==
- Qazaqstan Temir Zholy (Kazakhstan Railways)
- Kyakhta
