= Dzungarian Gate =

Mountain pass in the Dzungarian Alatau range

- Alatao Pass
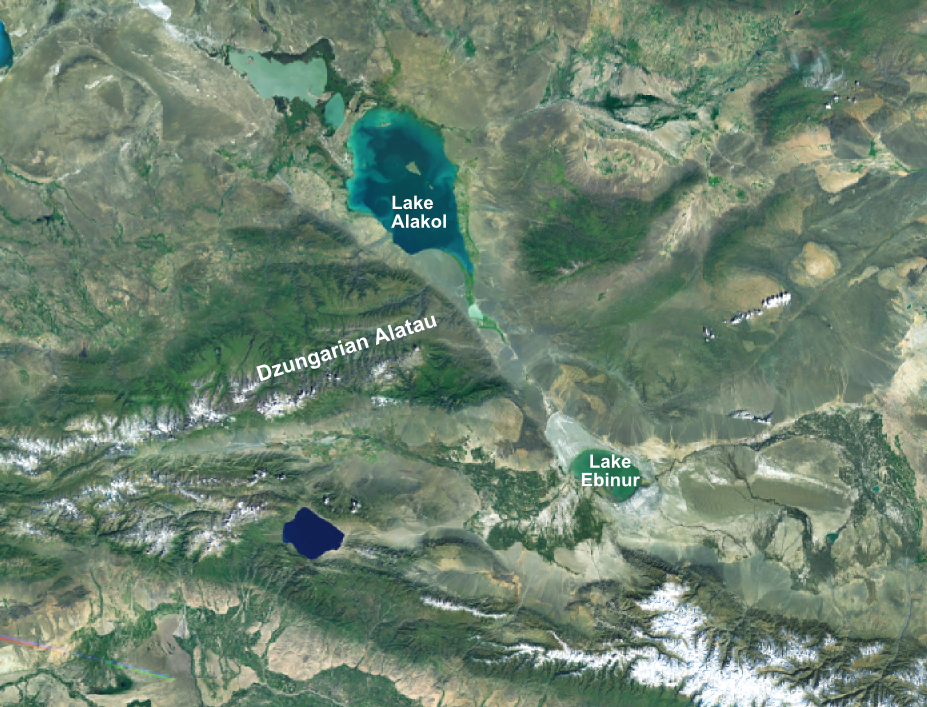
- Satellite photograph of the Dzungarian Gate, the pale, fault-lined valley running between Lake Alakol and Lake Ebinur through the Dzungarian Alatau mountain range.

- Location within Dzungaria Location within Kazakhstan
- Interactive map of Dzungarian Gate

Location
- Location: China–Kazakhstan border
- Range: Dzungarian Alatau
- Coordinates: 45°21′N 82°25′E

Dzungarian Gate

Chinese name
- Traditional Chinese: 阿拉山口
- Simplified Chinese: 阿拉山口
- Literal meaning: Alatao Pass
Transcriptions
Standard Mandarin
- Hanyu Pinyin: Ālā Shānkǒu

Kazakh name
- Kazakh: Жетісу қақпасы, Жоңғар қақпасы جەتىسۋ قاقپاسى، جوڭعار قاقپاسى; Jetısu qaqpasy, Joñğar qaqpasy

Mongolian name
- Mongolian: Зүүнгарын хаалга Züüngariin khaalga

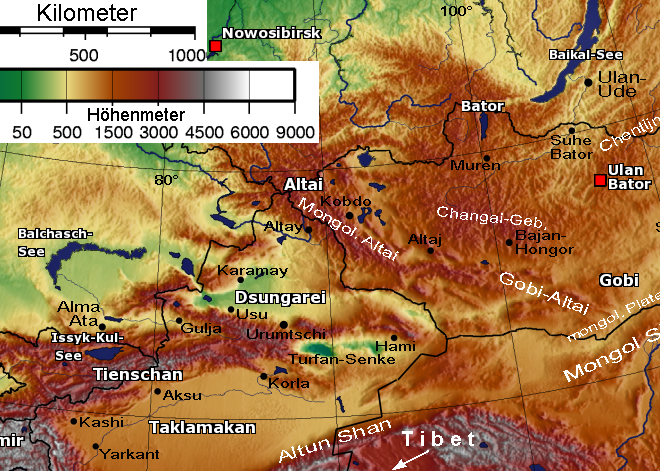
Lake Ebinur (unlabeled) lies in the west of the Dzungarian basin, to the left of the letter "D" in "Dsungarei", within which it would fit. The larger Lake Alakol (also unlabeled) lies to its northwest, over the border in Kazakhstan. The valley of the Dzungarian Gate (yellow, given its elevation) runs from northwest to southeast through the mountain range that lies between the two lakes.

The Dzungarian Gate, also known as the Altai Gap, is a geographically and historically significant mountain pass between Central Asia and China. It has been described as the "one and only gateway in the mountain-wall which stretches from China to Afghanistan, over a distance of 3,000 miles (4,800 km)." Given its association with details in a story related by Herodotus, it has been linked to the location of legendary Hyperborea.

The Dzungarian Gate (Chinese: 阿拉山口; pinyin: Ālā Shānkǒu; Kazakh: Жетісу қақпасы Jetısu qaqpasy or Жоңғар қақпасы Joñğar qaqpasy) is a straight valley which penetrates the Dzungarian Alatau mountain range along the border between Kazakhstan and Xinjiang, China. It currently serves as a railway corridor between China and the West. Historically, it has been noted as a convenient pass suitable for riders on horseback between the western Eurasian steppe and lands further east, and for its fierce and almost constant winds.

In his Histories, Herodotus relates travelers' reports of a land in the northeast where griffins guard gold and where the North Wind issues from a mountain cave. Given the parallels between Herodotus' story and modern reports, scholars such as Carl Ruck, J.D.P. Bolton and Ildikó Lehtinen have speculated on a connection between the Dzungarian Gate and the home of Boreas, the North Wind of Greek mythology, with legend describing the people who live on the other side of this home of the North Wind as a peaceful, civilized people who eat grain and live by the sea.

== Geography ==
The windswept valley of the Dzungarian Gate, 6 mi (10 km) wide at its narrowest, is located between Lake Alakol to the northwest, part of the Balkhash-Alakol Basin in Kazakhstan, and Ebinur Lake (Chinese: 艾比湖; pinyin: Àibǐ Hú) to the southeast in China. At its lowest, the floor of the valley lies at about 1,500 feet (460 m) elevation, while the surrounding peaks of the Dzungarian Alatau range reach about 10,000 feet (3,000 m) to the northeast and 15,000 feet (4,600 m) to the southwest.

Douglas Carruthers, who explored the area in the first decade of the 20th century, writes:

The Dzungarian Gate is a defile about six miles wide at its narrowest point, and forty-six miles long, connecting Southern Siberia with Dzungaria. It forms a natural pathway from the plateau of Mongolia to the great plain of North-western Asia, and is the one and only gateway in the mountain-wall which stretches from Manchuria to Afghanistan, over a distance of three thousand miles. On the west, the Ala-tau drops suddenly from peaks above snow-line to the level of the floor of the depression, 700 feet above the level of the ocean,—the lowest altitude in the inland basins of Central Asia, with the exception of the Turfan depression, which is actually below sea-level.

Geologically, the valley of Dzungarian Gate was created by the active strike-slip Dzungar fault system. In strike-slip faults the blocks slide past each other laterally, and in this case they do so in a counter-clockwise direction or dextrally, similar to the famous San Andreas Fault.

Remarking on it as a geological and physical phenomenon, Carruthers continues:

[T]he Dzungarian Gate is as unusual as that of the Jordan depression. They are both examples of a rift-valley caused by the movement of the earth's crust, not by the action of water. This valley once formed the connecting link between the drainage of Dzungaria and that of Southern Siberia. The chain of lakes at either end of the valley (Balkash, Ala Kul, Ebi Nor, etc.), are the remains of the great Asiatic Mediterranean Sea; if their waters were to rise a few hundred feet they would break through the Gate, flooding the plains to the north and south.

Noting that, "In prehistoric days the Dzungarian Gate must have presented a still more wonderful sight" when it "formed a narrow strait joining the Dzungarian inlet with the vast seas of Western Siberia," Carruthers quotes the British journalist and MP, Morgan Philips Price, with whom he travelled:

One can picture the Dzungarian Gate in the Ice Age: a narrow strait through which the Arctic-AraloCaspian Sea ebbed and flowed into the seas of Central Asia, scoured by icebergs descending from ancient glaciers on the Ala-tau and Barlik Mountains and forested perhaps down to the water's edge,—not unlike the Straits of Belle Isle at the present day. Now a change has been wrought; earth-movement has drained the sea. But away to the north there still remain the lakes of Ala Kul, Sasik Kul, and Balkash, and on the south Ebi Nor,—pools left in the desert—all that remains of the great icy sea. The alluvial plains, once its bed, are now covered by desert grasses, while the forest clings only to the shaded slopes and gullies on the northern slopes of the mountains.

== History ==
=== Origins and the Silk Road ===
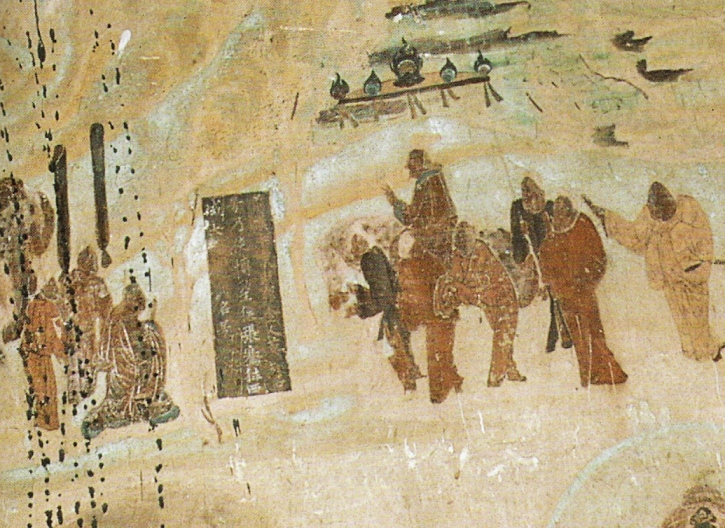
Zhang Qian taking leave from emperor Han Wudi, for his expedition to Central Asia from 138 to 126 BCE, Mogao Caves mural, 618–712.

One of the earliest mentions of the Dzungaria region dates to when Emperor Wu of Han (reigning 141–87 BCE), dispatched the Han Chinese diplomat Zhang Qian to investigate lands to the west. The northernmost Silk Road trackway, about 2,600 kilometres (1,600 mi) in length, connected the ancient Chinese capital of Xi'an to the west over the Wushao Ling Pass to Wuwei and emerged in Kashgar before linking to ancient Parthia.

Dzungaria is named after a Mongolian kingdom which existed in Central Asia during the seventeenth and eighteenth centuries. It derived its name from the Dzungars, who were so called because they formed the left wing (züün, left; gar, hand) of the Mongolian army, the self-named Oirats. It was raised to its greatest prominence by Galdan (also known as Galdan Boshigtu Khan) in the latter half of the 17th century, who made repeated incursions on the territory of the Kazakh state, until Galdan was wiped out by the Qing government in about 1757–1759. It played an important part in the history of Mongolia and the great westward Mongolian migrations. After 1761 its territory fell mostly to the Qing dynasty (Xinjiang and north-western Mongolia) and partly to Russian Turkestan (earlier the Kazakh state provinces of Semirechye- Jetysu and Irtysh river).

A traveler going west from China must go either north of the Tian Shan through Dzungaria or south of the Tian Shan through the Tarim Basin. Trade usually took the southern route and migrations the northern. This is most likely because the Tarim leads to the Ferghana Valley and Iran, while Dzungaria leads only to the open steppe. The difficulty with the southern route was the high mountains between the Tarim and Ferghana. There is also another reason. The Taklamakan Desert of the Tarim is too dry to support much grass, and therefore lacked nomads likely to rob caravans. Its inhabitants lived mostly in oases formed where rivers ran out of the mountains into the desert. These were inhabited by peasants who were unwarlike and merchants who had an interest in keeping trade running smoothly. On the other hand, Dzungaria had a fair amount of grass, few towns to base soldiers in and no significant mountain barriers to the west. Therefore, trade went south and migrations north.

=== Modern development ===
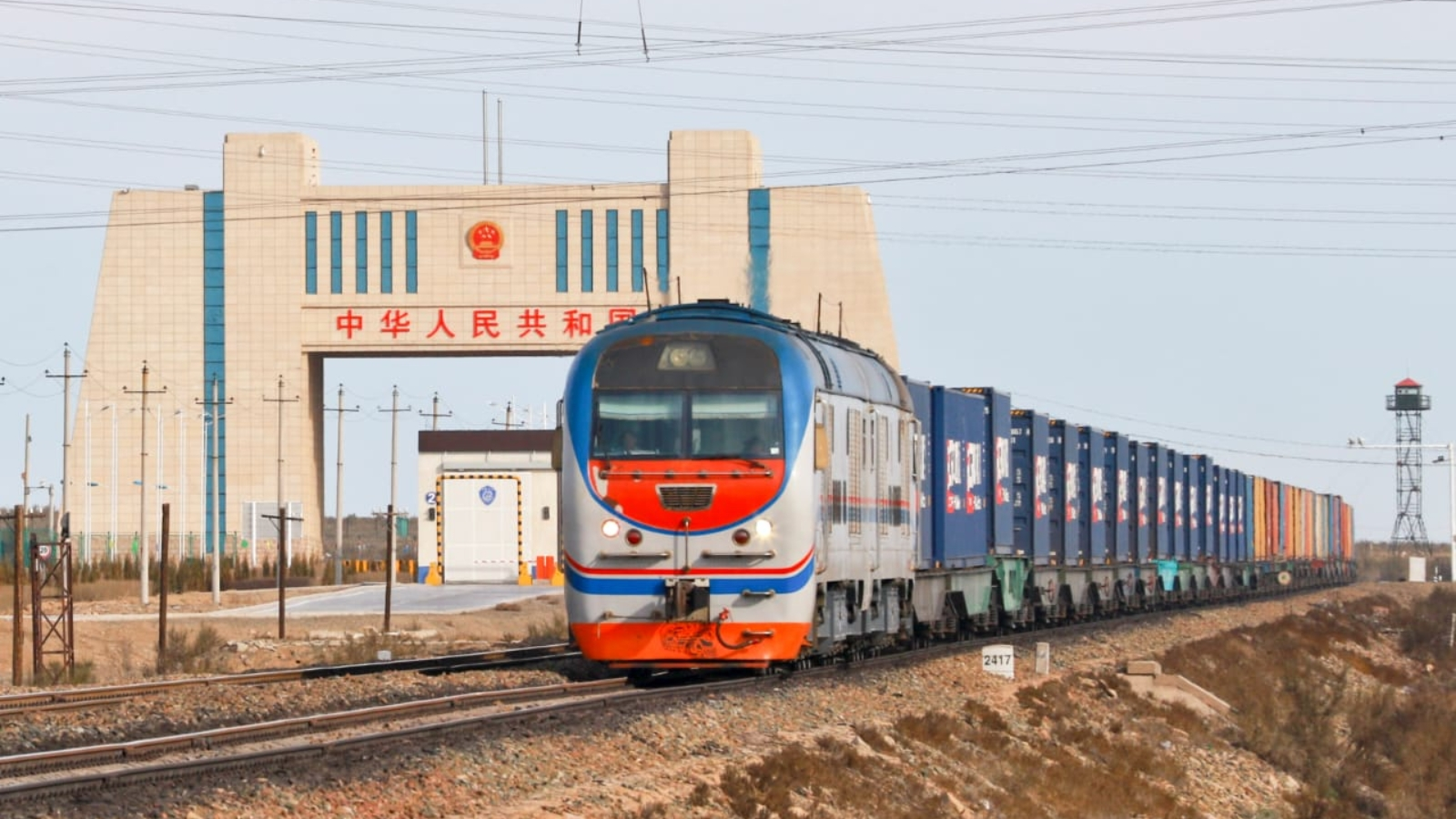
A freight train entering the Alashankou station

The Chinese city of Alashankou lies on the eastern end of the valley in the Börtala Mongol Autonomous Prefecture of Xinjiang. To the west, in the Almaty Province of Kazakhstan, lies its smaller counterpart, Dostyk, or Druzhba in Russian.

Modern development of the pass for its economic potential was delayed by political considerations. An agreement between the Soviet Union and the People's Republic of China to connect Kazakhstan with Western China by rail had been reached in 1954. On the Soviet side, the railway reached the border town of Druzhba (Dostyk) (whose names, both Russian and Kazakh, mean 'friendship') in 1959. On the Chinese side, however, the westward construction of the Lanzhou-Xinjiang railway was stopped once it reached Urumqi in 1962. Due to the Sino-Soviet Split, the border town remained a sleepy backwater for some 30 years, until the Alashankou railway station was finally completed on September 12, 1990. Since the 2010s, freight trains to Russia, Germany or Poland are sent over the pass.

== Hyperborean connection ==
World map according to Herodotus (c. 484 – c. 425 BC). Top right are the countries of the Issedones, Arimaspi, and, in the extreme northeast, the Hyperboreans. Click the map for a larger view.

The Dzungarian Gate has been noted in modern history as the most convenient pass for horseback riders between the western Eurasian steppe and lands further east, and for its fierce and almost constant winds. The area has also become known for its gold deposits and for producing prodigious numbers of dinosaur fossils, especially Protoceratops. Given that Herodotus relates a story of a traveller to the East who visited a land where griffins guard gold and east of which live the Hyperboreans, modern scholars have theorized that the Dzungarian Gate may be the real-world location of the home of Boreas, the North Wind of Greek Legend.

The Greek writer Herodotus writes in his Histories (4.13) that the explorer Aristeas, a native of Proconnesus in Asia Minor active circa 7th century BC, had written a hexameter poem (now lost) about a journey to the Issedones of the far north. Aristeas reported that beyond them lived the one-eyed Arimaspians, further on were the gold-guarding griffins, and beyond these the Hyperboreans.

This Aristeas, possessed by Phoibos, visited the Issedones; beyond these live the one-eyed Arimaspoi, beyond whom are the Grypes that guard gold, and beyond these again the Hyperboreoi, whose territory reaches to the sea. Except for the Hyperboreoi, all these nations are always at war with their neighbors...

Based on Greek and Scythian sources, Herodotus describes the Issedones as living east of Scythia and north of the Massagetae, while the geographer Ptolemy (VI.16.7) appears to place the trading stations of Issedon Scythica and Issedon Serica in the Tarim Basin. They may have been identical with the people described in Chinese sources as the Wusun. According to E. D. Phillips, the Issedones are "placed by some in Western Siberia and by others in Xinjiang." J. D. P. Bolton places them on the south-western slopes of the Altai Mountains.

Since Herodotus places the Hyperboreans beyond the Massagetae and Issedones, both Central Asian peoples, it appears that his Hyperboreans may have lived in Siberia. Heracles sought the golden-antlered hind of Artemis in Hyperborea. As the reindeer is the only deer species of which females bear antlers, this would suggest an arctic or subarctic region. Following Bolton's location of the Issedones on the south-western slopes of the Altay Mountains, Ruck places Hyperborea beyond the Dzungarian Gate into northern Xinjiang.

=== Griffin ===
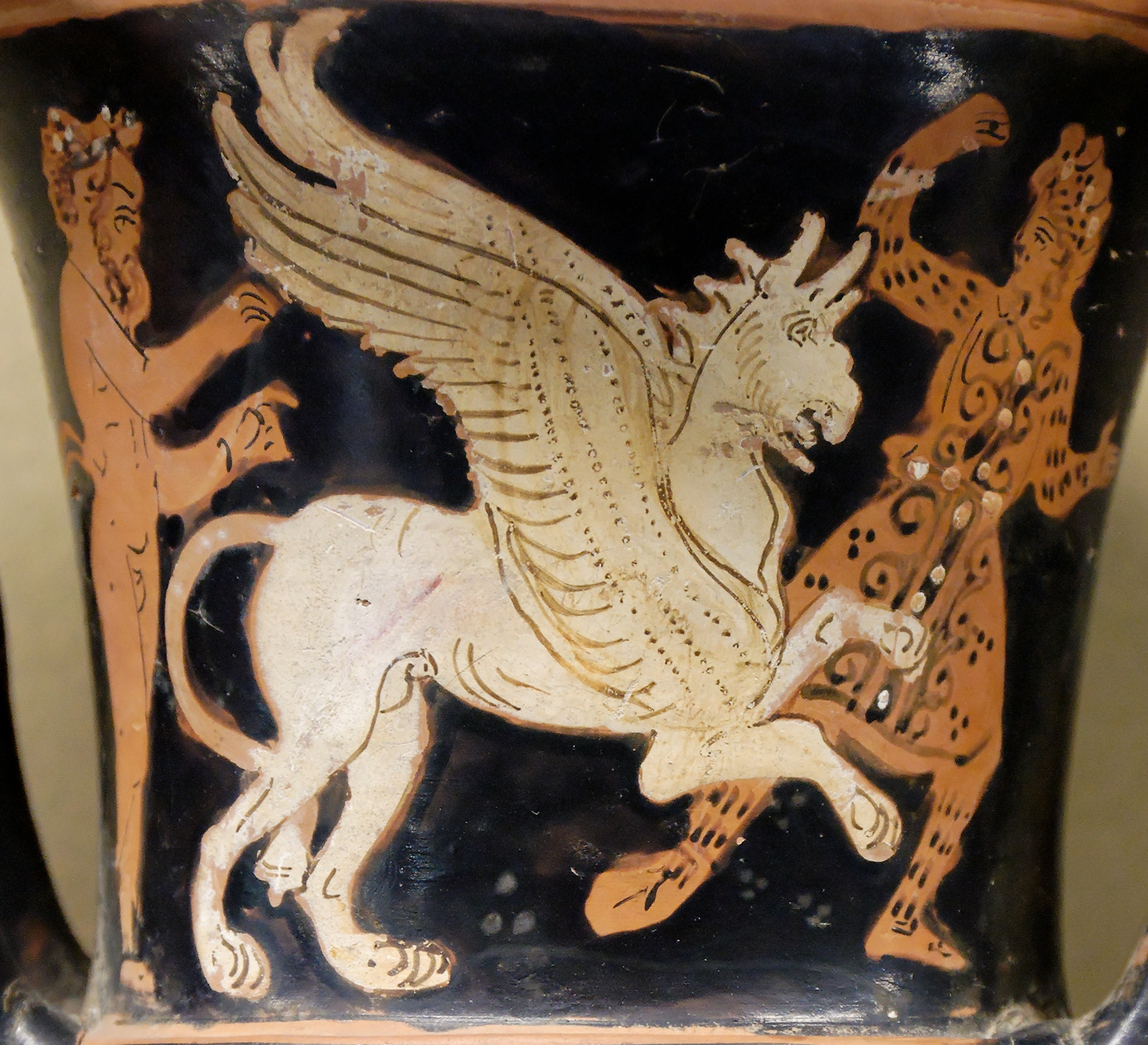
Scythian vs griffin on a Greek vase

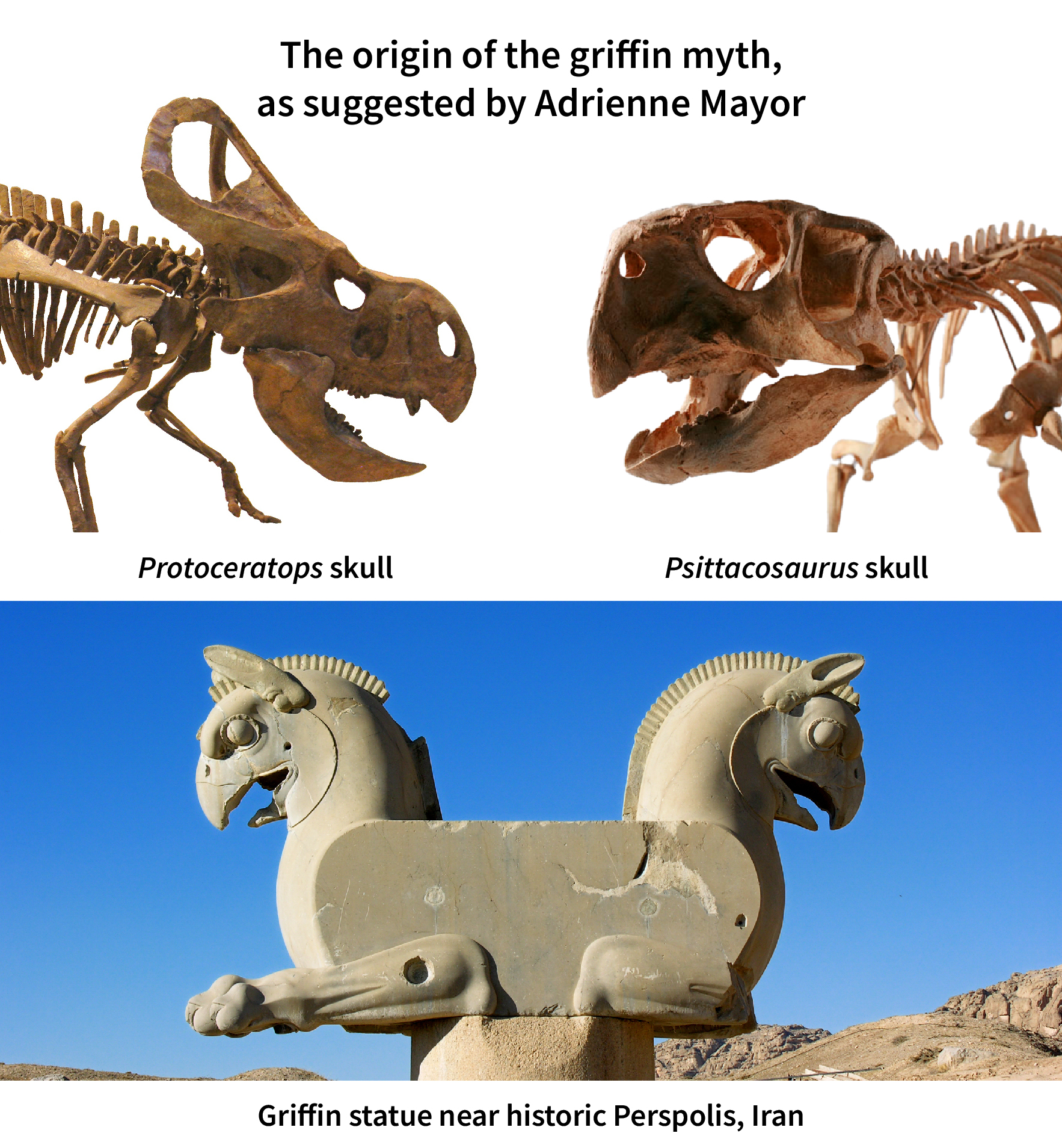
Protoceratops skeletons are often found disarticulated. Unconnected to the skull, the plates of the head shield could be misinterpreted as wings.

The griffin (Greek: γρύφων, grýphōn), a legendary creature with the body of a lion and the head and wings of an eagle, is a common heraldic theme of Central Asia. According to modern theory, the griffin was an ancient misconception derived from fossilized remains of the Protoceratops found in conjunction with gold mining in the mountains of Scythia, present day eastern Kazakhstan.

According to Mayor and Dodson the association of the Dzungarian Gate with gold and griffin (Protoceratops) skeletons spanned a thousand years of classical history:

The second-century A.D. Alexandrian geographer Ptolemy and ancient Chinese sources agree in locating the issedonians along the old trade routes from China to the West, from the western Gobi desert to the Dzungarian (or Junggarian) Gate, the mountain pass between modern Kazakhstan and north-western China. Recent linguistic and archaeological studies confirm that Greek and Roman trade with Saka-Scythian nomads flourished in that region from Aristeas's day to about A.D. 300—exactly the period during which griffins were most prominently featured in Greco-Roman art and literature.

=== North Wind ===
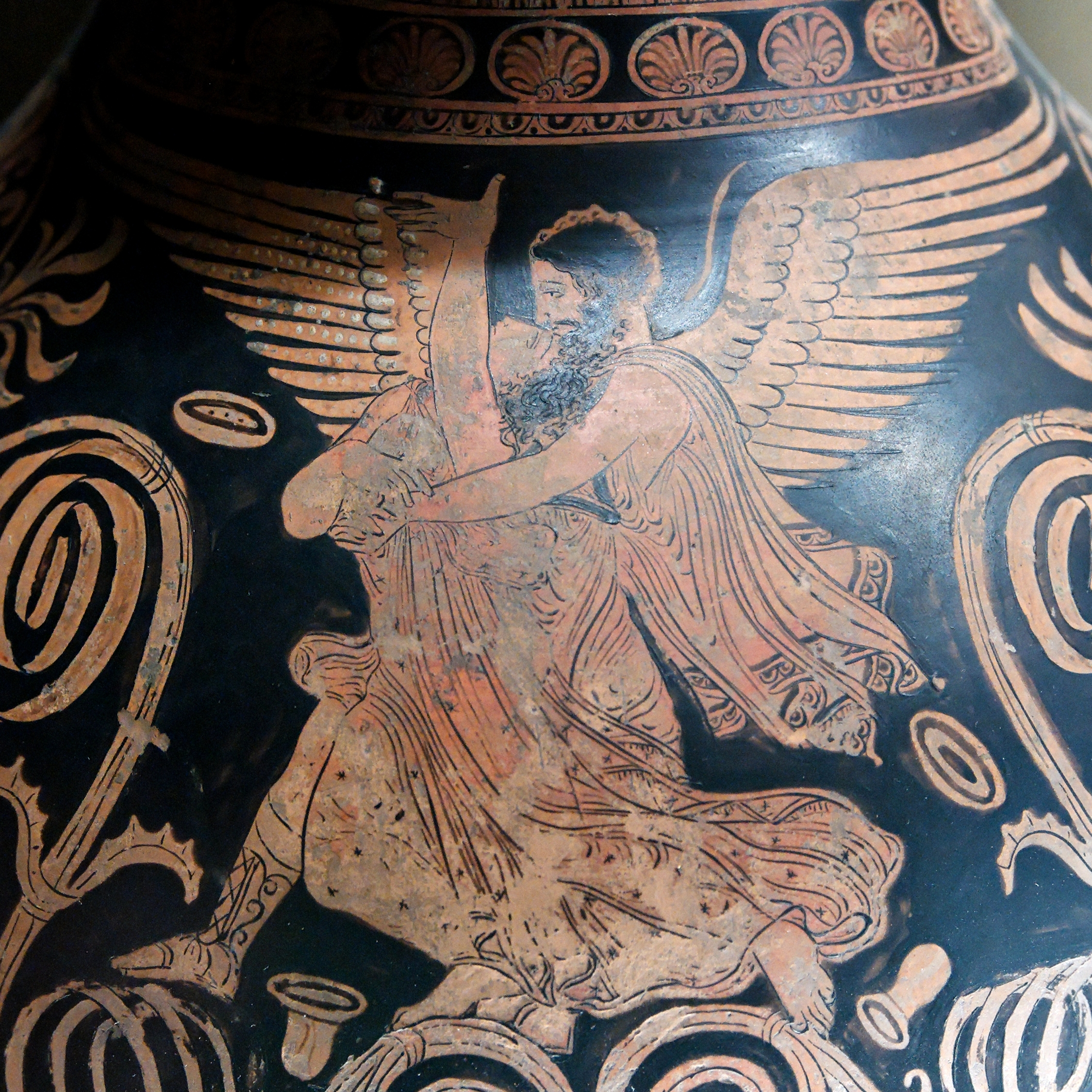
Rape of Oreithyia by Boreas. Detail from an Apulian red-figure oinochoe, 360 BC

The story of Boreas, the personified cold north winter wind of Greek legend who lived in a cave north of Greece, parallels that of the buran, a strong winter wind said to blow into the Kazakh Steppe out of a hole in a mountainside in the Dzungarian Gate.

==== Buran ====
Ildikó Lehtinen writes that "the story of the cave of the stormwinds somewhere near the Dzungarian Gate" has been known for 2500 years, by travelers from Aristeas in the classic era, to Giovanni di Piano Carpini in the Middle Ages (before Marco Polo), and to Gustaf John Ramstedt in the 20th century.

Carruthers reports the story of the buran, a ferocious winter wind said to sally from a hole in the side of a mountain:

We had frequently heard of the terrors, dangers, and winds of the Dzungarian Gate... The natives relate the usual traditions as to the origin of the winds in this locality. In the myths of Central Asia a "hole in the mountain," or "an iron gate in a lake" is the usual explanation of the origin of winds. In the case of which I am writing the island called Ala-tyube—a small extinct volcano in Ala Kul—is made responsible for the furious winds which sweep through the depression; the wind is called "ebe," or "yube" by the Kirghiz, and in special cases, when it reaches its maximum velocity, the term "buran" is applied.

==== Boreas ====
Boreas (Greek: Βορέας, Boréas) was the Greek god of the cold north wind and the bringer of winter. (Mallory and Adams speculate that the name may derive from a Proto-Indo-European root *gworh- meaning mountain.) Boreas is depicted as being very strong, with a violent temper to match. He was frequently shown as a winged old man with shaggy hair and beard, holding a conch shell and wearing a billowing cloak. Pausanias wrote that Boreas had snakes instead of feet, though in art he was usually depicted with winged human feet. Closely associated with horses (native to the Eurasian steppe; see Przewalski's horse, also known as the Dzungarian horse), Boreas was said to have fathered twelve colts after taking the form of a stallion, to the mares of Erichthonius, king of Troy. Pliny (Natural History iv.35 and viii.67) thought that mares might stand with their hindquarters to the North Wind, and bear foals without a stallion. Przwalski's mares are noted for turning their hindquarters to strong winds. The Greeks believed that Boreas's home was in Thrace, and Herodotus and Pliny both describe a northern land known as Hyperborea ("Beyond the North Wind"), where people lived in complete happiness and had extraordinarily long lifespans.

== Gallery ==
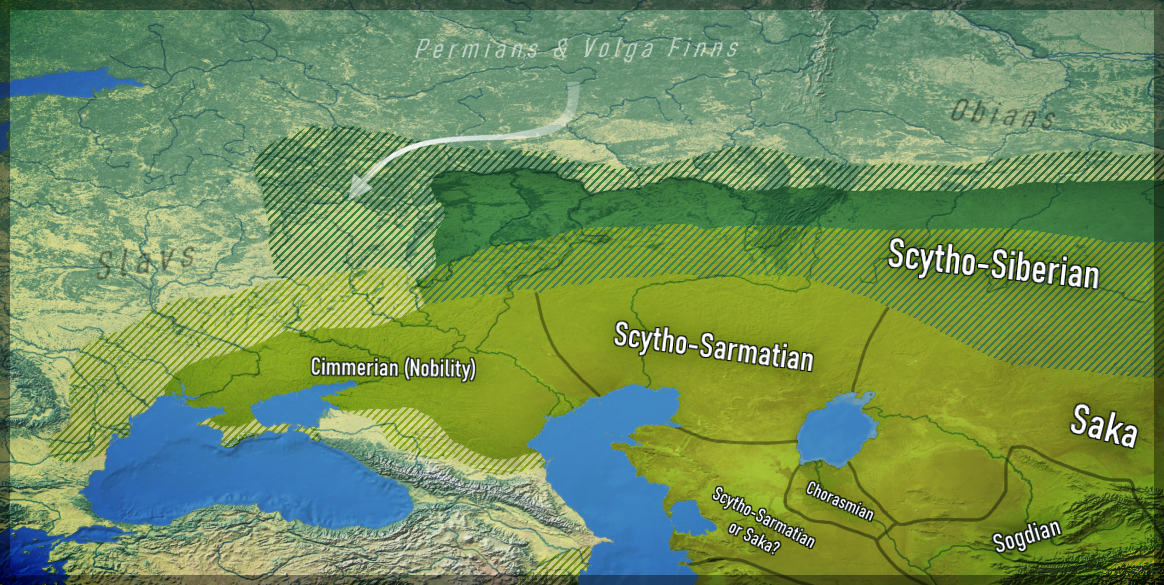
Map of various Iranic populations of Central Asia during the Iron Age highlighted in green.)

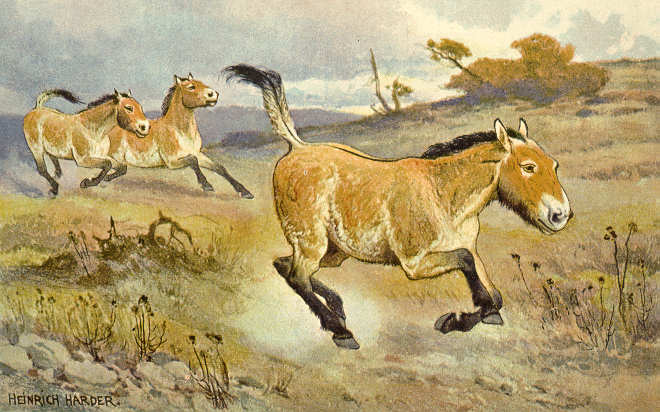
Przewalski's horse, native to the Dzungarian Basin

== See also ==
- Jordan Rift Valley
- Tarim Basin
- Tarim mummies
- Pole of inaccessibility

== Bibliography ==
- Bolton, James David Pennington (1962) Aristeas of Proconnesus Clarendon Press, Oxford, OCLC 1907787
- Douglas Carruthers, Unknown Mongolia : a record of travel and exploration in north-west Mongolia and Dzungaria, with three chapters on sport by J. H. Miller, and a foreword by Earl Curzon of Kedleston - London: Hutchinson, 1914. Volume I Volume II
