= Jinghe County =

Jinghe County 精河县 (Chinese) جىڭ ناھىيىسى (Uyghur) ᠵᠢᠩ ᠰᠢᠶᠠᠨ (Mongolian) Jing
- County
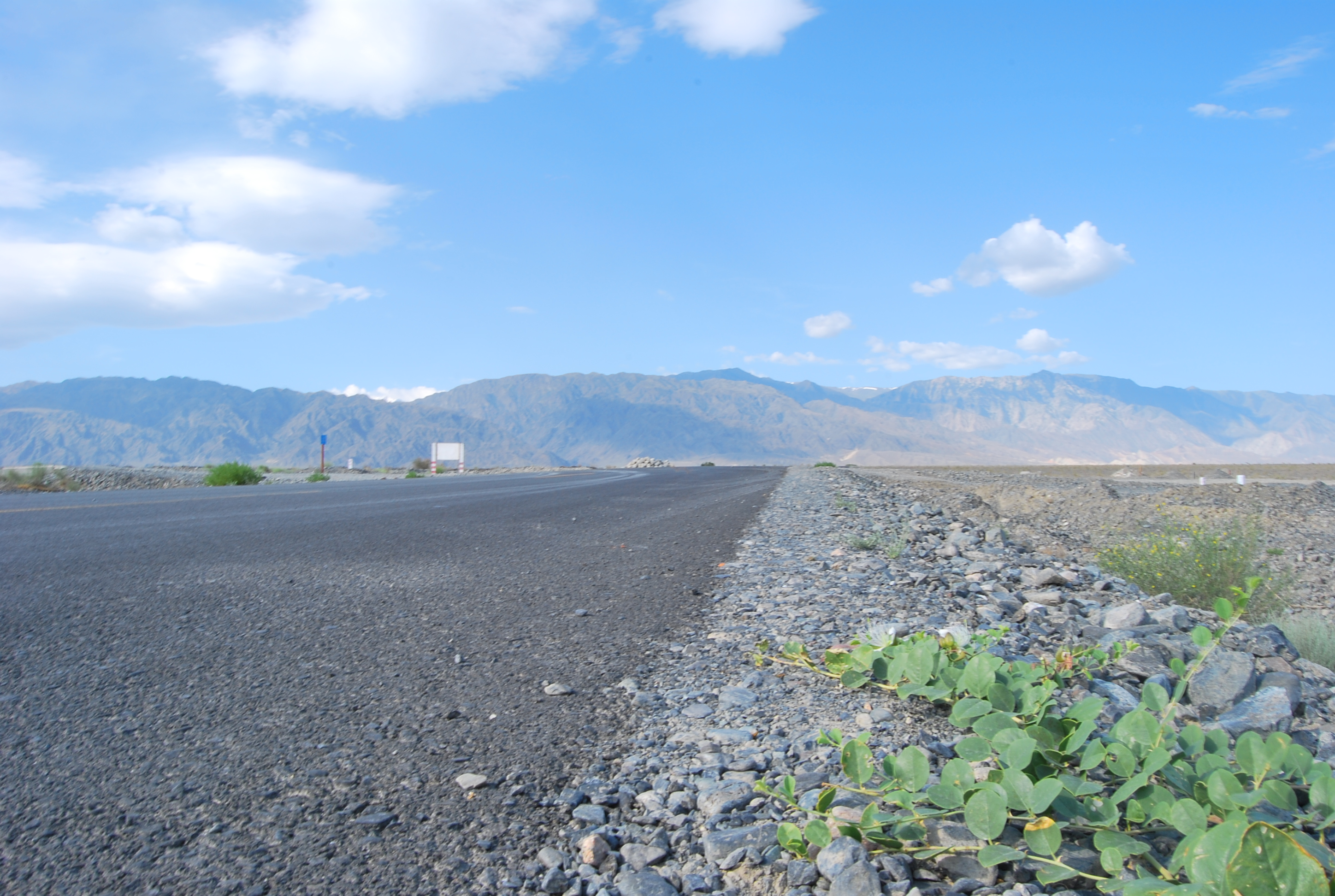
- The Lianhuo Expressway going through Jinghe County

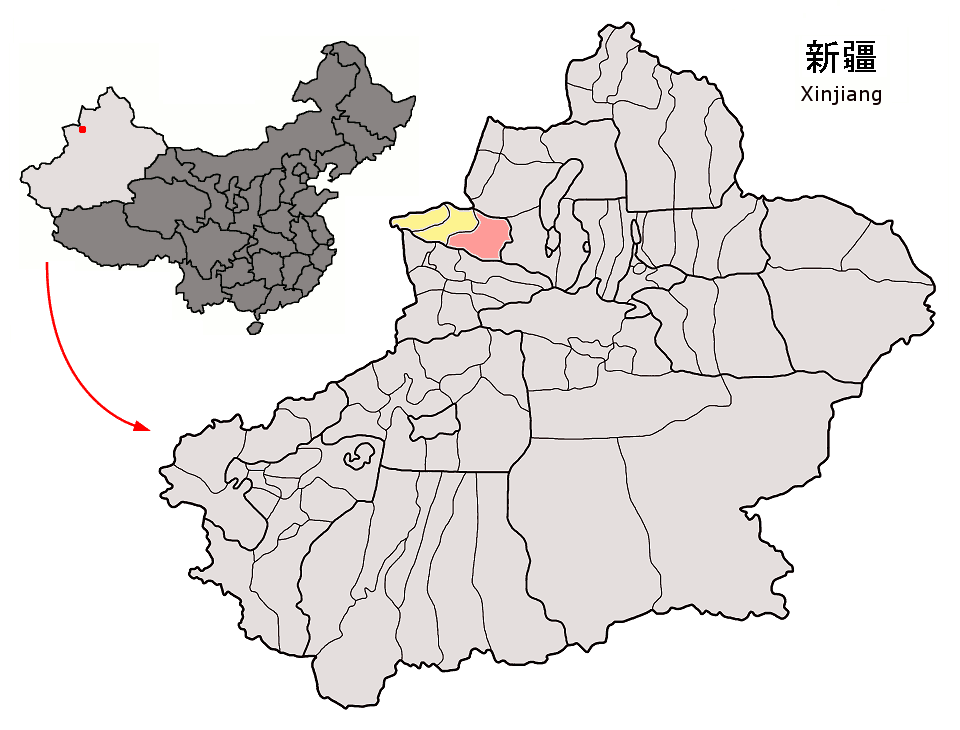
- Jinghe County (red) within Bortala Prefecture (yellow) and Xinjiang

- Location in Xinjiang Jinghe (Xinjiang) Jinghe (China)
- Coordinates: 44°36′N 82°54′E
- Country: China
- Autonomous region: Xinjiang
- Autonomous prefecture: Bortala
- County seat: Jinghe Town

Area
  - Total: 11,181 km^{2} (4,317 sq mi)
- Elevation: 321 m (1,053 ft)

Population (2020)
  - Total: 125,968
  - Density: 11.266/km^{2} (29.179/sq mi)
- Time zone: UTC+8 (China Standard (Note: Locals in Xinjiang frequently observe UTC+6 (Xinjiang Time), 2 hours behind Beijing.))
- Website: www.xjjh.gov.cn

Jinghe County

Chinese name
- Simplified Chinese: 精河县
- Traditional Chinese: 精河縣
Transcriptions
Standard Mandarin
- Hanyu Pinyin: Jīnghé Xiàn

Alternative Chinese name
- Simplified Chinese: 精县
- Traditional Chinese: 精縣
Transcriptions
Standard Mandarin
- Hanyu Pinyin: Jīng Xiàn

Mongolian name
- Mongolian Cyrillic: Жин шянь
- Mongolian script: ᠵᠢᠩ ᠰᠢᠶᠠᠨ
Transcriptions
- SASM/GNC: ǰiŋ siyan

Uyghur name
- Uyghur: جىڭ ناھىيىسى
Transcriptions
- Latin Yëziqi: Jing nahiyisi
- Yengi Yeziⱪ: Jing naⱨiyisi
- SASM/GNC: Jing Nahiyisi
- Siril Yëziqi: Җиң наһийиси

Kazakh name
- Kazakh: جىڭ اۋدانى Жың ауданы Jyñ audany

Jinghe County (Chinese: 精河县) as the official romanized name, also transliterated from Uyghur as Jing County (Uyghur: جىڭ ناھىيىسى), is a county of the Xinjiang Uyghur Autonomous Region and is under the administration of the Börtala Mongol Autonomous Prefecture. It contains an area of 11,181 square kilometres (4,317 sq mi). According to the 2002 census, it has a population of 120,000.

== Geography and climate ==
Jinghe has a desert climate (Köppen BWk), with a mean total of only 102 millimetres (4.02 in) of precipitation per annum and great seasonal differences in temperature, with long, very cold winters, and hot, dry summers. As spring and autumn are short, winter and summer are the main seasons. Temperatures can easily fall below −20 °C (−4 °F) in winter or rise above 35 °C (95 °F) in summer. The monthly 24-hour average temperature ranges from −14.9 °C (5.2 °F) in January to 25.7 °C (78.3 °F) in July; the annual mean is 8.22 °C (46.8 °F). With monthly percent possible sunshine ranging from 35% in December to 70% in August and September, the county receives 2,554 hours of bright sunshine annually.

Climate data for Jinghe County, elevation 329 m (1,079 ft), (1991–2020 normals, extremes 1991–present)
Month	Jan	Feb	Mar	Apr	May	Jun	Jul	Aug	Sep	Oct	Nov	Dec	Year
Record high °C (°F)	4.2 (39.6)	8.0 (46.4)	25.4 (77.7)	36.7 (98.1)	39.7 (103.5)	40.2 (104.4)	42.3 (108.1)	40.9 (105.6)	36.7 (98.1)	30.4 (86.7)	19.6 (67.3)	7.4 (45.3)	42.3 (108.1)
Mean daily maximum °C (°F)	−10.6 (12.9)	−5.0 (23.0)	7.3 (45.1)	20.5 (68.9)	27.3 (81.1)	32.3 (90.1)	33.6 (92.5)	31.8 (89.2)	25.5 (77.9)	16.0 (60.8)	4.2 (39.6)	−6.4 (20.5)	14.7 (58.5)
Daily mean °C (°F)	−15.5 (4.1)	−10.1 (13.8)	1.8 (35.2)	13.5 (56.3)	20.2 (68.4)	25.1 (77.2)	26.3 (79.3)	24.3 (75.7)	18.2 (64.8)	9.4 (48.9)	−0.3 (31.5)	−10.4 (13.3)	8.5 (47.4)
Mean daily minimum °C (°F)	−19.5 (−3.1)	−14.5 (5.9)	−2.8 (27.0)	7.4 (45.3)	13.8 (56.8)	18.6 (65.5)	19.8 (67.6)	17.8 (64.0)	11.7 (53.1)	4.0 (39.2)	−3.8 (25.2)	−13.5 (7.7)	3.3 (37.9)
Record low °C (°F)	−32.7 (−26.9)	−33.4 (−28.1)	−21.6 (−6.9)	−6.4 (20.5)	1.6 (34.9)	6.5 (43.7)	9.4 (48.9)	5.7 (42.3)	0.3 (32.5)	−7.1 (19.2)	−20.5 (−4.9)	−30.2 (−22.4)	−33.4 (−28.1)
Average precipitation mm (inches)	3.9 (0.15)	4.4 (0.17)	4.4 (0.17)	12.5 (0.49)	16.2 (0.64)	14.0 (0.55)	16.6 (0.65)	14.0 (0.55)	8.9 (0.35)	8.7 (0.34)	5.6 (0.22)	6.7 (0.26)	115.9 (4.54)
Average precipitation days (≥ 0.1 mm)	9.4	7.7	4.4	5.1	6.0	7.6	8.0	6.4	4.2	3.5	4.7	11.7	78.7
Average snowy days	21.6	15.6	6.3	0.6	0	0	0	0	0	0.1	7.0	21.1	72.3
Average relative humidity (%)	79	77	68	48	41	43	48	50	51	62	75	81	60
Mean monthly sunshine hours	110.9	128.4	172.5	241.5	293.3	293.4	308.1	297.8	260.4	205.4	108.7	87.3	2,507.7
Percentage possible sunshine	38	43	46	59	63	63	66	70	71	62	39	32	54
Source: China Meteorological Administration

== Demographics ==
The proportion of nationalities in Jinghe County
Nationality	Percentage
Han People	55.8%
Kazakhs	20.0%
Mongols	13.7%
Uyghurs	4.9%
Hui People	4.4%
Others	1.2%
Source of the population statistics :

== Subdivisions ==
Jinghe County is made up of 4 towns and 1 township.

Name	Simplified Chinese	Hanyu Pinyin	Uyghur (UEY)	Uyghur Latin (ULY)	Mongolian (traditional)	Mongolian (Cyrillic)	Administrative division code
Towns
Jinghe Town (Jing Town)	精河镇	Jīnghé Zhèn	جىڭ بازىرى	jing baziri	ᠵᠢᠩ ᠪᠠᠯᠭᠠᠰᠤ	Жин балгас	652722100
Daheyanzi Town	大河沿子镇	Dàhéyánzǐ Zhèn	داخېيەنزە بازىرى	daxëyenze baziri	ᠳ᠋ᠠᠠᠾᠧᠶᠠᠩᠽᠢ ᠪᠠᠯᠭᠠᠰᠤ	Тангеанз балгас	652722101
Toli Town	托里镇	Tuōlǐ Zhèn	تولى بازىرى	toli baziri	ᠲᠣᠯᠢ ᠪᠠᠯᠭᠠᠰᠤ	Доли балгас	652722102
Todok Town (Todog)	托托镇	Tuōtuō Zhèn	تودوگ بازىرى	todog baziri	ᠲᠣᠭᠣᠳᠠᠭ ᠪᠠᠯᠭᠠᠰᠤ	Тоодог балгас	652722103
Township
Mangdam Township	茫丁乡	Mángdīng Xiāng	ماندان يېزىسى (ماندانبۇلاق يېزىسى)	mandan yëzisi (mandanbulaq yëzisi)	ᠮᠠᠨᠳᠠᠨᠪᠤᠯᠠᠭ ᠰᠢᠶᠠᠩ	Мантанбулаг шиян	652722200

Others:

- Akqi Farm (阿合其农场, ئاقچى دېھقانچىلىق مەيدانى, ᠠᠬᠠᠴᠢ
  ᠲᠠᠷᠢᠶᠠᠯᠠᠩ ᠤᠨ
  ᠲᠠᠯᠠᠪᠠᠢ)
- Bajiahu Farm (八家户农场, باجاخۇ چارۋىچىلىق مەيدانى, ᠪᠠᠵᠠᠬᠤ
  ᠲᠠᠷᠢᠶᠠᠯᠠᠩ ᠤᠨ
  ᠲᠠᠯᠠᠪᠠᠢ)
- Jinghe Industrial Park (精河工业园区)
- XPCC 82nd Regiment Farm (兵团八十二团) (82-تۇەن مەيدانى) (82 ᠳᠤᠭᠠᠷ ᠲᠤᠸᠠᠨ ᠲᠠᠯᠠᠪᠠᠢ)
- XPCC 83rd Regiment Farm (兵团八十三团) (83-تۇەن مەيدانى) (83 ᠳᠤᠭᠠᠷ ᠲᠤᠸᠠᠨ ᠲᠠᠯᠠᠪᠠᠢ)
- XPCC 91st Regiment Farm (兵团九十一团) (91-تۇەن مەيدانى) (91 ᠳᠤᠭᠠᠷ ᠲᠤᠸᠠᠨ ᠲᠠᠯᠠᠪᠠᠢ)

== Transport ==
Jinghe is served by China National Highway 312. It is a railway junction for the Northern Xinjiang, Second Ürümqi-Jinghe and Jinghe-Yining-Horgos Railways.

== Gallery ==
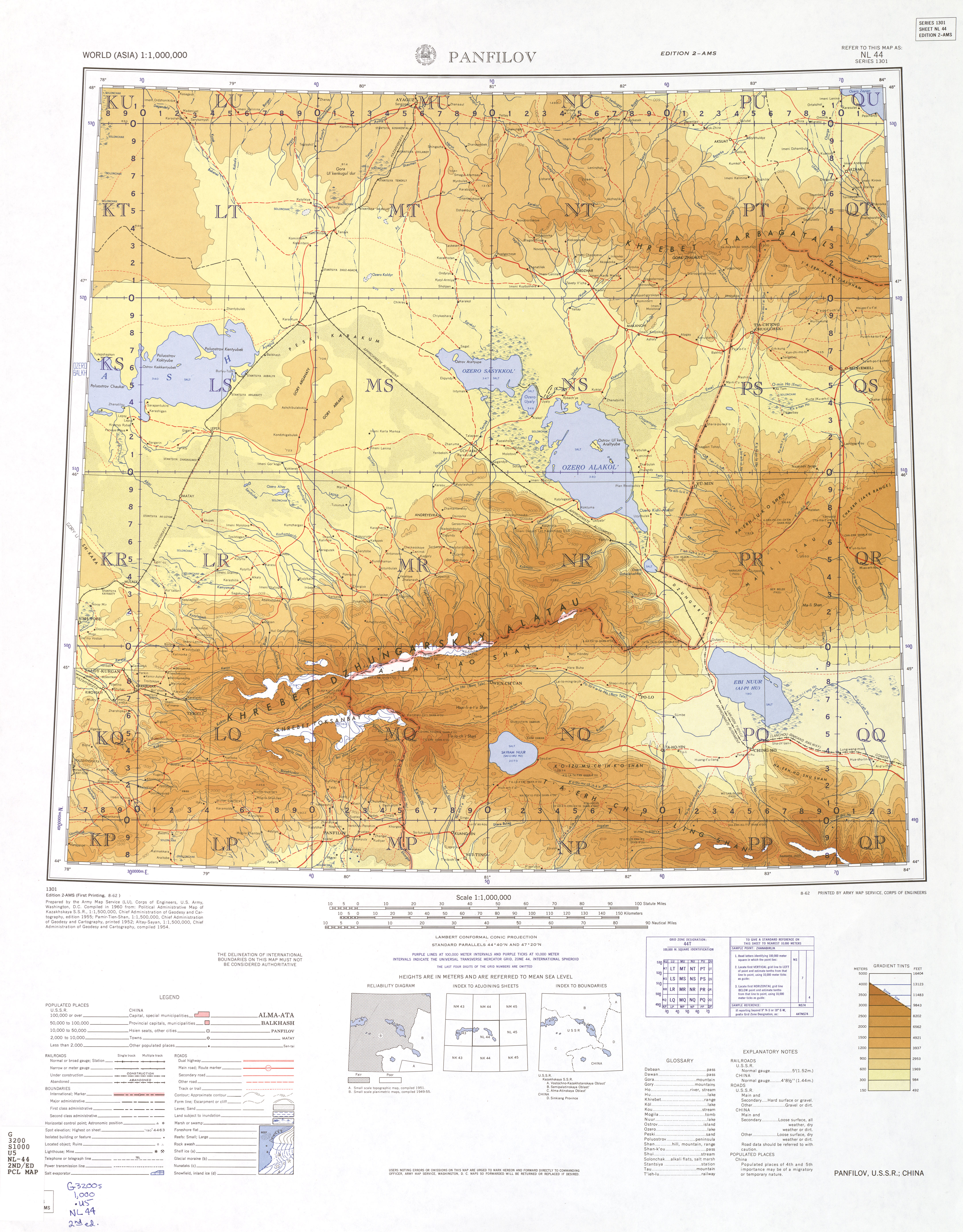
Map including Jinghe (labeled as CHING-HO) and surrounding area from the International Map of the World (1960)
