= China–Kazakhstan relations =

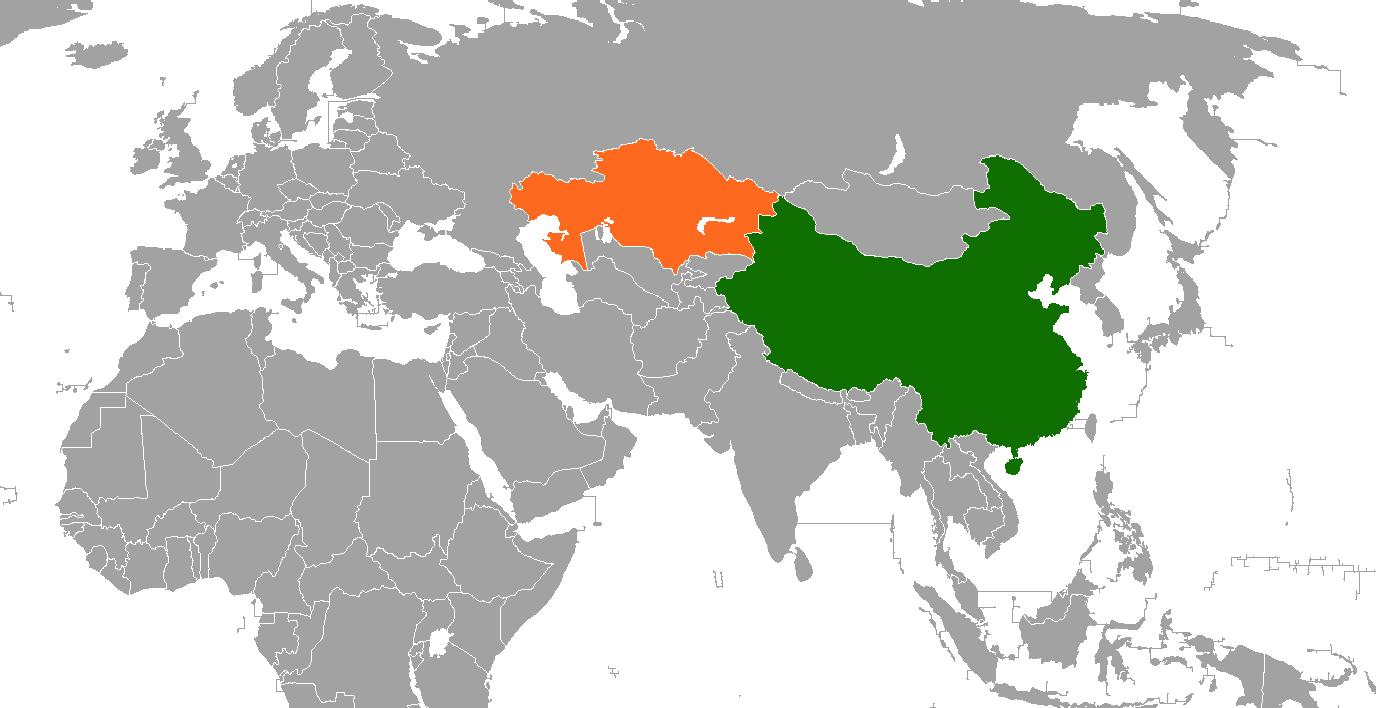

- China: Kazakhstan

Diplomatic mission
- Chinese Embassy, Astana: Kazakh Embassy, Beijing

China and Kazakhstan have diplomatic and economic relations, as well as energy cooperation and military ties. Historical interactions between dynastic China and the Kazakhs trace back to the 2nd century BC, with complicated periods. China and Kazakhstan established diplomatic relations in 1992, following Kazakhstan's independence from the Soviet Union. In 2005, the two countries signed a strategic partnership. They upgraded their relationship to a permanent comprehensive strategic partnership in 2024.

== Historical relations ==
China came into contact with Kazakhstan as early as the 2nd century BC.

=== Han dynasty ===
During the Han dynasty, one of Kazakhstan's ancestors, the Wusun, practiced heqin (intermarriage) with the Chinese, marking the beginning of relations. During the rule of Emperor Wu of Han, Zhang Qian was the official dispatched to the Western Regions (西域 xiyu) to help the Wusun against the Xiongnu (which were also one of the ancestors of modern Kazakhs). Since the Wusun did not want to cooperate with the Xiongnu, they allied with the Han dynasty to defeat the Xiongnu (Han–Xiongnu War).

The Battle of Zhizhi (郅支之戰) was fought in 36 BC between the Han dynasty and the Xiongnu chieftain Zhizhi Chanyu. Zhizhi was defeated and killed. The battle was probably fought near Taraz on the Talas River in eastern Kazakhstan, which makes it one of the westernmost points reached by a Chinese army (Protectorate of the Western Regions).

=== Tang ===
During the Tang dynasty, China reached apex by crushing the Western Turkic Khaganate, which was an ancestral state of the Kipchaks that would birth the future Kazakh people, and established the Anxi Protectorate. Later in 751 the Battle of Talas was fought in the same area as the Battle of Zhizhi, which China lost and slowly weakened Chinese influence in Central Asia, though not until the An Lushan rebellion were the Western Turks won back their freedom.

=== Mongols ===
In the 13th century, Genghis Khan briefly unified the two regions under the Mongol Empire. However, once the Mongol Empire divided, the two separate realms were founded: the Golden Horde under Jochi would have an immense impact on the development of Kipchaks as a deeply Mongolised Turkic tribe, ultimately gave birth to Kazakh identity in the future; while the Yuan dynasty ruling China would become one of China's dynasties, though it never shed away its Mongol identity and ultimately fell in 1368 as the only de-Sinicised Chinese dynasty in the history.

=== Ming ===
Long before the founding of the Kazakh nation, the Kazakhs established ties with the Tarim Basin region. In 1456, Kerei Khan (克烈) and Janibek Khan (贾尼别克) defected to the Moghulistan, which controlled the Tarim Basin region. Esen Buqa II gave the western part of the western border in Zhetysu to two Kazakh kings. This provided territory for the initial establishment of the Kazakh Khanate. Since then the two countries have joined forces against enemies and intermarried like the Uzbek Khanate and Timurid Empire, but they have also fought each other.

It was during this time, the first Kazakh embassy visited China sometime around the 1450s. Under the reign of Jiajing (1522–1566), the foundations for a flourishing relationship between Ming China and the Kazakh Khanate were established, but contacts stopped after 1537, as the Ming dynasty was more focused on internal affairs and less interested in going to war elsewhere.

=== Qing ===
In the 16th century, a group of Oirat Mongolians crossed the Altai Mountains from the Mongolian Plateau to enter the Dzungarian basin and then entered the Kazakh Steppe. In 1640, the Dzungars unified the various tribes of Oirat Mongolia and formed the Dzungar khanate. In 1680 the Dzungars defeated the Yarkent Khanate in the Tarim Basin region. In the 17th century, the Dzungars defeated the second of three Zhuz's of the Kazakh Khanate, causing a huge crisis among Kazakh population, including the infamous Barefooted Flight. During this time, Qing envoys had made some records about the conflict during the reign of Kangxi Emperor. As the Kazakhs and Qing Chinese shared a common enmity with the Dzungars, there was an attempt for an alliance between them, and Qing China actively encouraged rebellion among Kazakh and Kyrgyz subjects under Dzungar control.

By 1755, the Qianlong Emperor sent troops to wipe out the Dzungar Dawachi regime and ordered the recruitment of the Kazakhs. Initially, the tribal alliance led by Ablai Khan expressed support for the Qing troops against the Dzungars and flocked to assist the Qing armies, helping them to defeat the Dzungars at the same year. However, once Qianlong's real intention became clear that he wanted to expand his empire to Kazakh steppe, and the fact that the last Dzungar ruler, Amursana, was married to Ablai Khan's daughter, the Kazakh–Chinese relations deteriorated quickly when Ablai Khan quickly allied with his son-in-law and the Dzungar remnants, resulted in a devastating First Sino-Kazakh War between the two states; the Chinese proved superior and crushed much of the Kazakh resistance, despite high casualties of their own, and establishing Chinese control for the first time since the Tang dynasty.

In 1757, Dzungar nobleman Amursana fled to Ablai Khan (阿布赉) after the rebellion failed, which Ablai Khan deliberately let his son-in-law to flee to Russia. After the Qing defeated the Dzungars and arrived at Lake Balkhash, Abulai and the Kazakh tribes under his rule, with his Khanate greatly devastated due to the Chinese invasion, agreed to submit to the Qing and sent envoys to the Chengde Mountain Resort to provide horses. As a gesture of gratitude, the Qianlong Emperor bestowed the title of Khan on Ablai and let him lead all the Kazakhs. Since then Kazakh tribes had continuously paid tribute to the Qing. Abulai had sent his descendants to Beijing to study, thus spreading the etiquette of China at that time to Central Asia.

However, at the same time, Kazakhs were also slaughtered en masse as part of the Dzungar genocide, as Qing officials could not distinguish Kazakhs and Dzungars. This event triggered a scarred memory among Kazakh populace, who viewed Qing China with suspicion; meanwhile, Qianlong did not trust the Kazakhs despite his leniency on Ablai Khan as Kazakh migration and population settlement clashed with his attempt to Sinicise his newly conquered land, which ultimately triggered the Second Sino-Kazakh War a decade after the first war ended. Ultimately, however, the Kazakh Khanate would be dismantled in 1782 by the Russian Empire, and its lands divided between Russia and China.

In 1862, Russian Cossack cavalry invaded Xinjiang and defeated Manchu troops, occupying 580,000 square kilometers, including a large part of present-day Kazakhstan. In 1864, China and Russia signed the Treaty of Demarcation of the Northwest Frontier (勘分西北界约记), which ceded part of the territory of China's northwest frontier to Russia, which would later be renamed Semirechye Oblast. However, due to porous border, movement continued, and some Kazakh tribes moved between China and Russia. The Qing government implemented a 1,000-family system in Kazakh tribes. Kazakhs had to pay taxes and accept direct jurisdiction from the central government. Around the same time, the Dungan rebellion broke out, causing many Dungans to flee to what would be Kazakhstan and Kyrgyzstan; the Russians, alongside the local Kazakhs and Kyrgyz, agreed to resettle these people, forming the modern Dungans across these two states, especially in Kazakhstan.

=== Republican China ===
During the final years of Tsar's rule, a large amount of Kazakh land was converted into immigrant areas, the number of livestock was greatly reduced, and the nomadic herdsmen's life deteriorated. During the First World War, the Tsar government recruited Kazakhs for military service, causing Kazakhs to rebel and revolt. More than 300,000 Kazakh nomads fled to China to avoid repression.

Countries which signed cooperation documents related to the Belt and Road Initiative

However, following the rise of the Kuomintang and Chiang Kai-shek's ascension to power, relations between Chinese and Kazakhs deteriorated greatly because the Chinese viewed them with suspicion due to their affinity with the Uyghurs, who were descended from Turkic Karluks. This resulted in the Xinjiang Wars, which Kazakhs and Kyrgyz took part in the Kumul Rebellion, with massacres from both sides. Around the same time, Joseph Stalin deliberately starved million of Kazakhs to death, forcing Kazakhs to flee to Xinjiang, only to be again massacred by Han and Hui Chinese warlords, who viewed them with contempt.

At the waning days of the Republican era, Osman Batur emerged as the chief of Kazakh people in their struggle against Chinese rule in Xinjiang, before being killed in 1951; this issue has since remained sensitive in China and there have been censorship of the matter to even today.

=== Early PRC ===
Kazakhs were recognised as one of China's national minorities after Mao Zedong proclaimed the foundation of the People's Republic in 1949, but Kazakh livelihood was quickly decimated and undermined during the Yi–Ta incident and later Cultural Revolution, which many Kazakhs were killed or fled the country to the Soviet Union. Kazakh living conditions would gradually improve under the lead of Deng Xiaoping, who ushered an era of economic reforms across the nation.

== Political relations ==
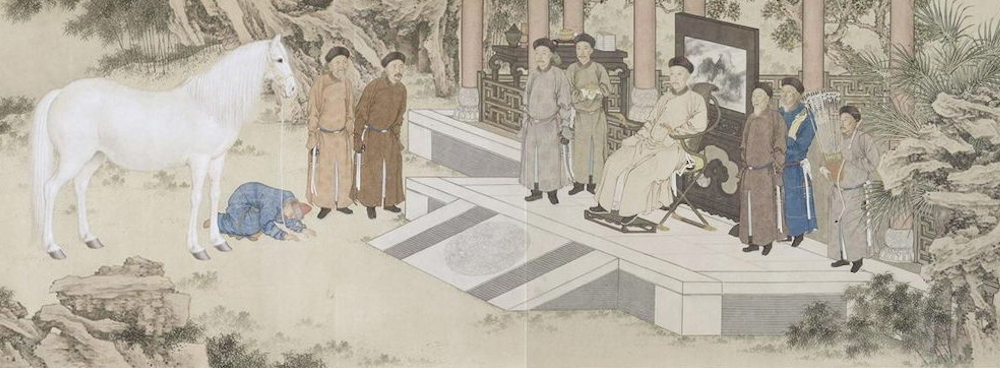
Kyrgyz deliver a white horse as a gift to the Qianlong Emperor of China (1757), soon after the Qing conquest of Xinjiang. Soon, intensive trade started in Kulja and Chuguchak, Kyrgyz horses, sheep and goats being traded for Chinese silk and cotton fabrics.

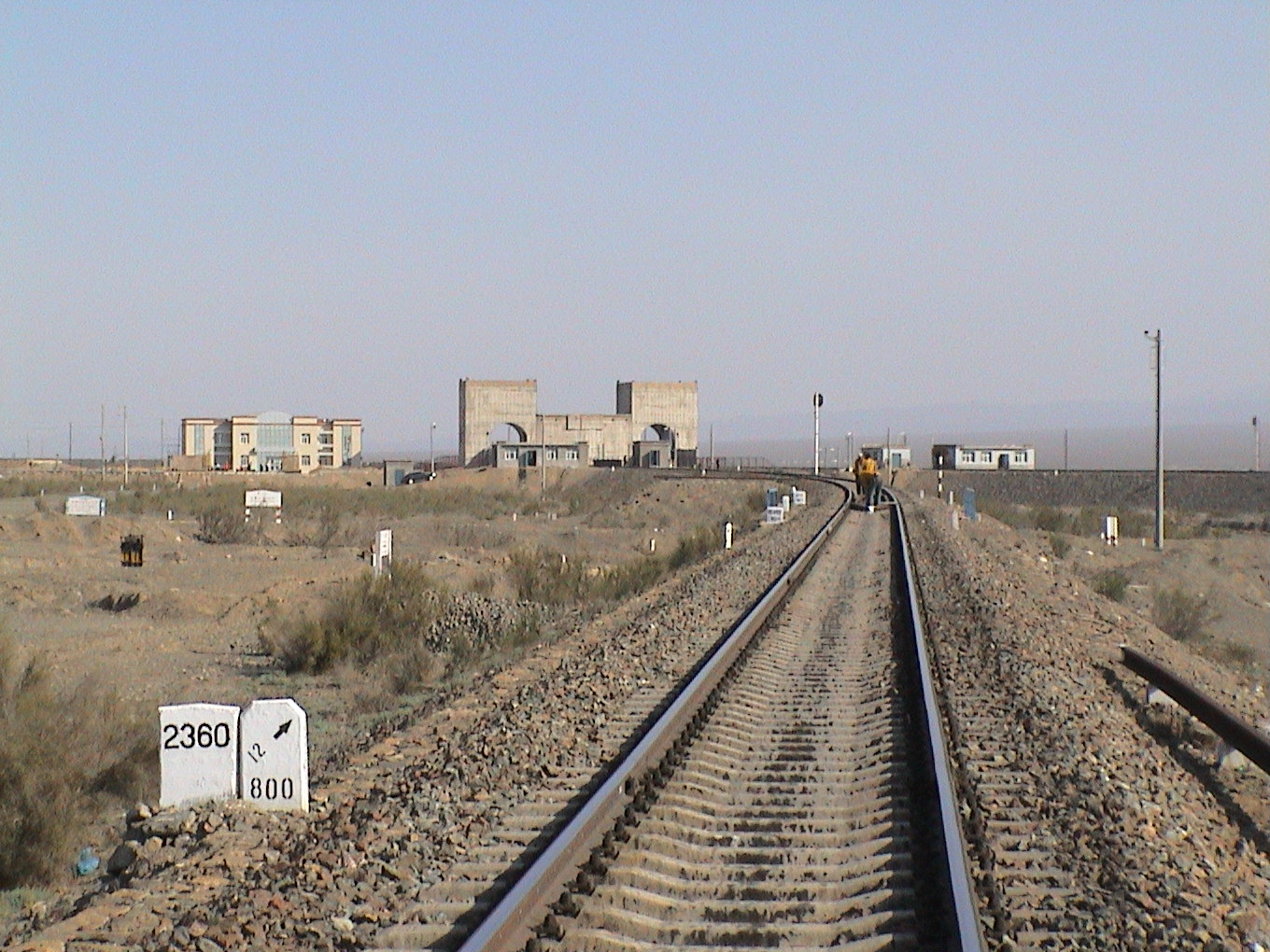
The railway crossing from China to Kazakshtan between Alashankou and Dostyk. Around 10 million ton of rail freight crosses the border here annually.

Kazakhstan is China's key partner in the Central Asian region due to its location, size, and substantial energy resources. Kazakh political elites portray cooperation with China in a positive light, which has also helped increase favorable public sentiment in Kazakhstan.

The People's Republic of China and Kazakhstan formed diplomatic relations on January 3, 1992, on the same day that the Kazakh government expressed support for the one-China policy and opposition to the East Turkestan independence movement. The two nations inherited a border dispute from the relations of China and the USSR, which they addressed with their first boundary agreement in April 1994, a supplementary agreement in September, 1997, and their second supplementary boundary agreement in July 1998 to mark their 1,700 kilometres (1,100 mi) shared border.

In 1993, the First President of Kazakhstan Nursultan Nazarbayev made an official visit to Beijing at the invitation of the then-Chinese President and CCP General Secretary Jiang Zemin. Since then, the leaders of China and Kazakhstan have frequently exchanged high-level official visits. In 1996, both nations became co-founders of the Shanghai Cooperation Organisation. New Kazakh President Kassym-Jomart Tokayev was educated in China. In 2005, both countries declared a strategic partnership.

On October 16, 2013, the Kazakhstan Majilis and China's Standing Committee of the National People's Congress (NPCSC) signed a memorandum of understanding. The agreement is the most important legislations signed between the two nations that further bilateral relations. The legislation helps both parliaments meet together to discuss bilateral issues amongst one another.

On 9 July 2020, the Chinese embassy in Kazakhstan issued a warning which stated that an unidentified strain of pneumonia with a death rate which was "much higher" than the one which is caused by COVID-19 was spreading in several Kazakh cities. It said that the provinces of Atyrau and Aktobe and the city of Shymkent had been effected and nearly 500 cases reported. However, the next day, the Kazakh Health Ministry dismissed the claim by China's embassy and media as "fake news" but did note that those pneumonia cases had exhibited clinical symptoms of abnormalities. Michael Ryan, a top official for the World Health Organization's Health Emergencies Program, says that the outbreak in Kazakhstan is likely to be COVID-19 cases that "just have not been diagnosed correctly." In 2024, the two countries declared a "permanent comprehensive strategic partnership."

Kazakhstan follows the one China principle, considering that government of the People's Republic of China is the sole legal government representing the whole of China and Taiwan is "an inalienable part" of China. Kazakhstan also supports all efforts by the PRC to "achieve national reunification" and opposes Taiwan independence.

== Economic relations ==
=== 1990s ===
In 1991, Kazakhstan and China signed an agreement to encourage the development of shop tourism. This trade grew quickly, with about 700,000 citizens of Kazakhstan crossing the border to China in 1992 to buy consumer goods for re-sale in Kazakhstan.

=== 2000s ===
China and Kazakhstan have promoted a rapid expansion of commerce and partnership over economic development, especially in harnessing Kazakhstan's oil, natural gas, minerals and other major energy resources. Kazakhstan proposed the creation of an oil pipeline to China, and the two countries signed an agreement in 1997 to build it. This pipeline became the first between China and any Central Asian country.

In 2002, China and Kazakhstan agreed to set up a border trade center, the SEZ International Centre for Border Cooperation at Khorgos, China.

Owing to rapidly expanding domestic energy needs, China has sought to obtain a leading role in cultivating and developing energy industries in Kazakhstan. Along with operating four smaller oil fields, the China National Petroleum Corporation in 2005 bought Petrokazakhstan, that was the former Soviet Union's largest independent oil company, for US$4.18 billion and spent another US$700 million on a pipeline that will take the oil to the Chinese border. Petrokazakhstan was the largest foreign purchase ever by a Chinese company. In 2009 China lent $10 billion to Kazakhstan and gained a stake in Mangistau Munai Gas.

=== 2010s ===
In 2011, Kazakhstan and China signed a currency swap agreement.

In 2013, Chinese President and CCP General Secretary Xi Jinping announced the Belt and Road Initiative's (BRI) land-based Silk Road component during a speech in Astana, Kazakhstan. Astana has become a major hub for the BRI, including for BRI-related financial services and legal services. Kazakhstan serves as a connector in the China-Central Asia-West Asia Economic Corridor, which aims to link China with Central Asia, South Caucasus, the Middle East, and Europe.

In 2015, Kazakhstan linked its Nurly Zhol (Bright Path) economic policy to the BRI, with a focus on transportation infrastructure, energy, and manufacturing.

From 2015 to 2017, Kazakhstan and China signed five agreements to create cooperation zones in transportation infrastructure, trade, processing industries, construction, agriculture, and more.

By 2016, Chinese companies (e.g. China National Petroleum Corporation, Sinopec and other) invested more than US$20 billion in the petroleum sector of Kazakhstan.

=== 2020s ===
In 2022, bilateral trade between China and Kazakhstan had reached $24 billion, which was a 34.1 percent increase over the year before. The Kazkah government aims to further grow annual trade turnover with China by up to $35 billion by 2030, following an agreement by the two countries' leaders. As of 2024, China is Kazakhstan's most important trading partner and foreign investor. China and Kazakhstan collaborate closely on the Digital Silk Road, with Chinese high-tech companies participating in the development of smart cities in Kazakhstan.

China's uranium procurement approach includes investment in foreign mining operations. Chinese investment in Kazakhstan mines have contributed to Kazakhstan's current position as the world's largest exporter of uranium. On the border between the two countries, at Khorgos, a special economic zone and logistics center has been established.

China-Kazakhstan economic relations saw a significant development with the launch of a new freight rail transit route on 4 March 2025, bypassing Russia. This new Middle Corridor route, which carries Chinese goods to Europe, departs from Chengdu, China, and travels through Kazakhstan, Turkmenistan, Iran, and Turkey, reaching the European Union's border. The first train, carrying electronics, is expected to complete the journey in 40 days. This move reduces transport costs and transit times while undermining Russia’s geopolitical leverage. Additionally, Kazakhstan and China were developing two other westbound freight routes across the Caspian Sea, further bypassing Russia.

On 20 March 2025, Kazakhstan's National Nuclear Center signed a memorandum with China Energy Overseas Investment Co., Ltd. and Shanghai Jiao Tong University to establish a Hydrogen Innovation Center in Kurchatov. This initiative aligned with Kazakhstan's hydrogen energy strategy, approved in September 2024, to achieve carbon neutrality by 2060.

At the inaugural Kazakhstan–China Transport Forum in Astana on 15 May 2025, officials from both countries announced a series of major infrastructure initiatives aimed at enhancing Kazakhstan's function as a critical logistics hub for Chinese exports to Russia and Europe. These include a new multimodal transit corridor via the Irtysh and Ili rivers, a cross-border bridge at Maykapshagay–Zimunay, expanded road and air links, and rail upgrades such as the Dostyk–Moiynty second track and an Almaty bypass, scheduled for completion by the end of 2025. Additionally, a container hub at the Caspian port of Aktau, built with Chinese cooperation, is set to boost Kazakhstan's maritime freight capacity. Trade volumes reflect this momentum, with road freight between the countries increasing by 82% and rail freight by 13% in early 2025. Parallel to these transport developments, Kazakhstan has attracted $1 billion in private investment in its geological sector and recently uncovered a major rare earth deposit, potentially positioning the country among the global leaders in critical minerals; resources vital to China's high-tech industries. Kazakhstan also participated in six-party talks in Tehran on 12 May 2025 to accelerate container traffic along the China–Europe rail corridor via Central Asia and Iran, with agreements reached on unified tariffs and delivery schedules. Longstanding environmental concerns remain, particularly regarding China's use of the Irtysh and Ili, which are essential to both countries’ agriculture and water supply systems.

On 16 July 2026, during Kazakh President Kassym-Jomart Tokayev's working visit to Shanghai, more than 70 commercial agreements worth over $15 billion were signed with Chinese companies. Also the Ministry of Transport, the Akimat of Mangystau Region, and Kazakhstan Guoyou Investment concluded an investment agreement for the construction of the first-phase multifunctional terminal at Kuryk Port.

In the energy sector, China provides Kazakhstan with technology and investment for Kazakhstan's energy transition, with Kazakhstan in turn providing nuclear fuel assembles for reactors in China.

== Cultural relations ==
In developing ties with China, Kazakhstan aims to balance the geopolitical and economic influence of its northern neighbour Russia. However, potential conflicts exist around China's cultural ties between the Kazakhs in China and the Uyghurs of China's Xinjiang province, which could influence a Uyghur separatist movement.

=== Cultural agreements ===
In August 1992, the Chinese and Kazakh governments signed the "Agreement on Cultural Cooperation between the Government of the People's Republic of China and the Government of the Republic of Kazakhstan."

=== Migration ===
Since 2000 the number of Chinese immigrants in Kazakhstan has increased significantly. According to a 2010 study, 68% of Kazakhs said they lived alongside Chinese citizens in their cities; 56% thought there were not that many Chinese, while 36% thought there were many. Most thought that the Chinese were there to find jobs (57%) and do business (49%). A smaller number thought they were there for other purposes, including marriage (8%), acquisition of citizenship (6%), and acquisition of property (4%). Tensions over Chinese workers in Kazakhstan have sometimes led to protests.

Kazakhstan has more than 100,000 to 200,000 Dungan people who fled from Xi'an, Gansu, Shaanxi and Ningxia more than 100 years ago. After the reform and opening up, they went to Xinjiang to do trade and imported technology from Xi'an to develop Kazakhstan's economy. As for Kazakhs in China, most live in northern Xinjiang, with a smaller number in Gansu and Qinghai. According to data from mid-2014, China has nearly 8,000 Kazakh students, and Kazakhstan also has Chinese students.

In May 2023, the countries agreed to create a visa-free regime to each other. In October 2023, Kazakhstan signed an agreement with China to crackdown on dual citizenship. Dual citizenship is forbidden by both nations but loopholes were previously used by Chinese nationals primarily from Xinjiang to flee to Kazakhstan. The agreements allows Kazakh and Chinese authorities to exchange information on citizens, including name, date and place of birth, photograph, identification issuing authority, citizenship status, exit and entry records, and whether a person had terminated their citizenship in the other country when they gained citizenship of another.

== Military relations ==
Aimed at bolstering regional partnership on regional security, economic development and fighting terrorism and drug trafficking amongst Central Asian nations, Kazakhstan and China become co-founders of the Shanghai Cooperation Organisation (SCO).

In 1997, both nations signed an agreement to reduce the presence of military forces along the common border along with Kyrgyzstan and Tajikistan.

The SCO aims to reduce the "three evils" of terrorism, separatism, and extremism. That objective has at the forefront of China's diplomatic dealings in Kazakhstan and elsewhere since 1997. On 28 March 2023, Kazakhstan and Xinjiang Uygur Autonomous Region (XUAR) of the People's Republic of China signed a Second friendly dialogue of cross-border cooperation, where covered areas including energy, tourism, food industry, engineering, agriculture, and others.

In March 2024, Kazakhstan's National Computer Emergency Response Team reported that Chinese state-backed hackers accessed the country's Ministry of Defense, telecommunications networks, and other critical infrastructure since at least two years prior.

== Historical and modern issues ==
=== Border and territorial disputes ===
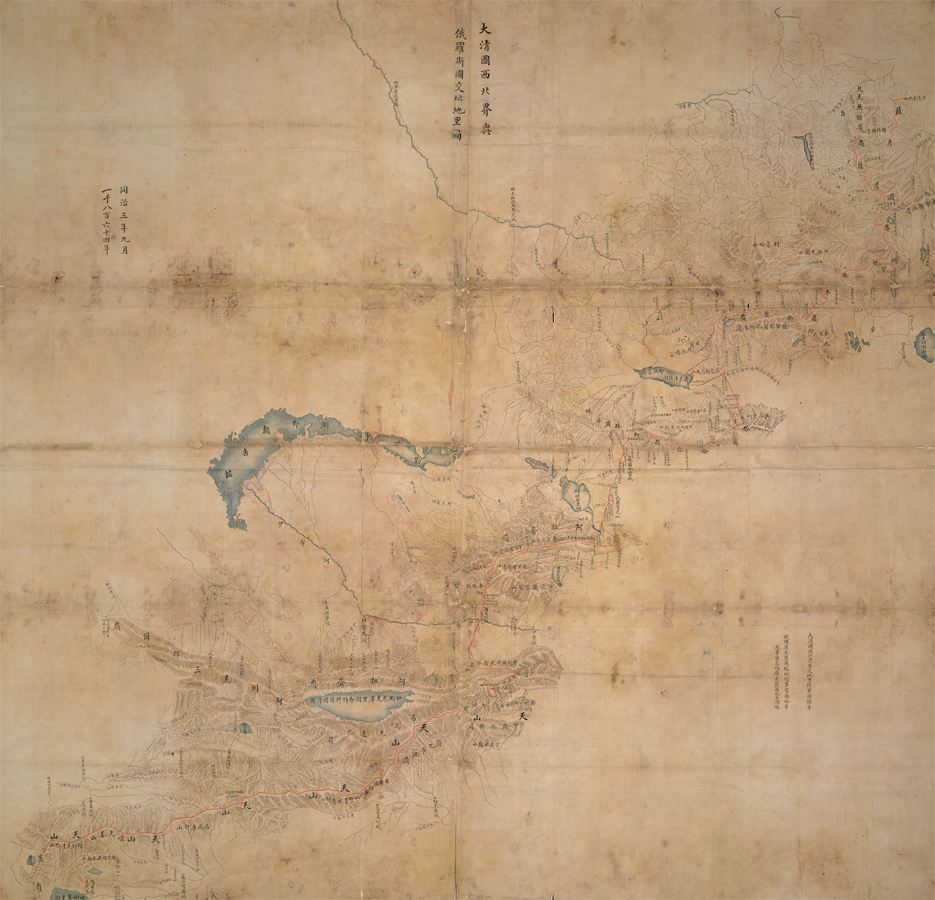
The Sino-Russian border set forth in the Protocol of Chuguchak (1864). Today's Sino-Kazakh border largely follows the line set in this protocol, with only fairly small changes

The origins of the border line between China and Kazakhstan date back to the mid-19th century, when the Russian empire was able to establish its control over the Lake Zaysan region. The establishment of the border between the Russian Empire and the Qing Empire, not too different from today's Sino-Kazakh border was provided for in the Convention of Peking of 1860; the actual border line pursuant to the convention was drawn by the Protocol of Chuguchak (1864), leaving Lake Zaysan on the Russian side. The Qing Empire's military presence in the Irtysh basin crumbled during the Dungan revolt (1862–77). After the fall of the rebellion and the reconquest of Xinjiang by Zuo Zongtang, the border between the Russian and the Qing empires in the Irtysh basin was further slightly readjusted, in Russia's favor, by the Treaty of Saint Petersburg (1881).

After the Xinhai Revolution and the Chinese Civil War, the October Revolution and the Russian Civil War in Russia, the Sino-Russian border became the PRC-USSR border. However, the Chinese and Soviet authorities were not always in agreement where the border line run on the ground, which led, in particular to a border conflict east of lake Zhalanashkol in August 1969.

When Kazakhstan became an independent country, around 2,420 square kilometers of land was disputed with China. A border treaty between the two nations was signed in Almaty on April 26, 1994, and ratified by the Kazakh president on June 15, 1995. China received around 22% of the total disputed territory, and Kazakhstan received the remaining 78%.

A narrow strip of hills east of Zhalanashkol which the USSR and China had contested in 1969 became recognized as part of China. To delineate certain small sections of the border more precisely, additional agreements were signed on 24 September 1997 and 4 July 1998. Over the next several years, the border was demarcated on the ground by joint commissions. According to the commissions protocols and maps, the two countries' border line is 1782.75 km long, including 1215.86 km of land border and 566.89 km of border line run along (or across) rivers or lakes. The commissions' work was documented by several joint protocols, finalized with the Protocol signed in Beijing on May 10, 2002.

According to MIT Professor Taylor Fravel, "The collapse of the Soviet Union might have presented China with an ideal opportunity to regain the more than 34,000 square kilometers of territory it claimed in Central Asia. In the context of ethnic unrest, however, China chose to improve ties with the newly independent states to deny external support to separatist groups in Xinjiang."

China compromised in territorial disputes with central Asian republics in order to secure their support for stability in Xinjiang. According to Fravel, "China needed cooperation with its neighbors to prevent the spread of pan-Islamic and pan-Turkic forces to the region, limit external support for separatists within Xinjiang, and increase cross-border trade as part of a broader strategy to reduce tensions among ethnic groups through development."

In a talk with China's Kazakhstan ambassador Zhang Xiao on 14 April 2020, the Kazakh Foreign Ministry expressed discontent with an article on Chinese website Sohu titled 'Why Is Kazakhstan Eager To Get Back to China?'. In an interview after returning to China, Zhang Xiao said the article was self-media (personal media) which did not represent China's official position at all and he would convey to "relevant domestic departments" his Kazakh counterpart's request to eliminate the influence of "people with ulterior motives". The article was then deleted and WeChat followed by removing 227 similar articles and banning 153 public accounts.

=== Repression of Kazakhs in China ===
Although China has largely directed their repression on the Karluk Uyghurs, the situation of Kipchak Kazakhs is also compromised by recent persecution under the administration of Xi Jinping, and more Kazakhs are also grouped as the threats by the Chinese government; more ethnic Kazakhs in China have been persecuted and imprisoned in Xinjiang re-education camps as of August 2020, many have fled from places like the Ili Kazakh Autonomous Prefecture into neighboring Kazakhstan.

As Kazakhstan is economically dependent on China, the Kazakh government has been unwilling to antagonize the Chinese authorities, and thus maintains a silent response out of fear of upsetting Beijing. Kazakh activists were also harassed by Kazakh authorities in recent years as well for actions deemed as anti-Chinese, souring positive perception on China among portion of Kazakhs. In April 2026, Kazakh authorities sentenced 11 Kazakhs to prison for a protest against the Chinese government's policies in Xinjiang.

== Public opinion ==
As of 2026, the trend in public opinion surveys in Kazakhstan is increasingly favorable views of China.

== Resident diplomatic missions ==
of China in Kazakhstan

- Astana (Embassy)
- Aktobe (Consulate-General)
- Almaty (Consulate-General)

of Kazakhstan in China

- Beijing (Embassy)
- Guangzhou (Consulate-General)
- Hong Kong (Consulate-General)
- Shanghai (Consulate-General)
- Xi'an (Consulate-General)
- Ürümqi (Consular office)

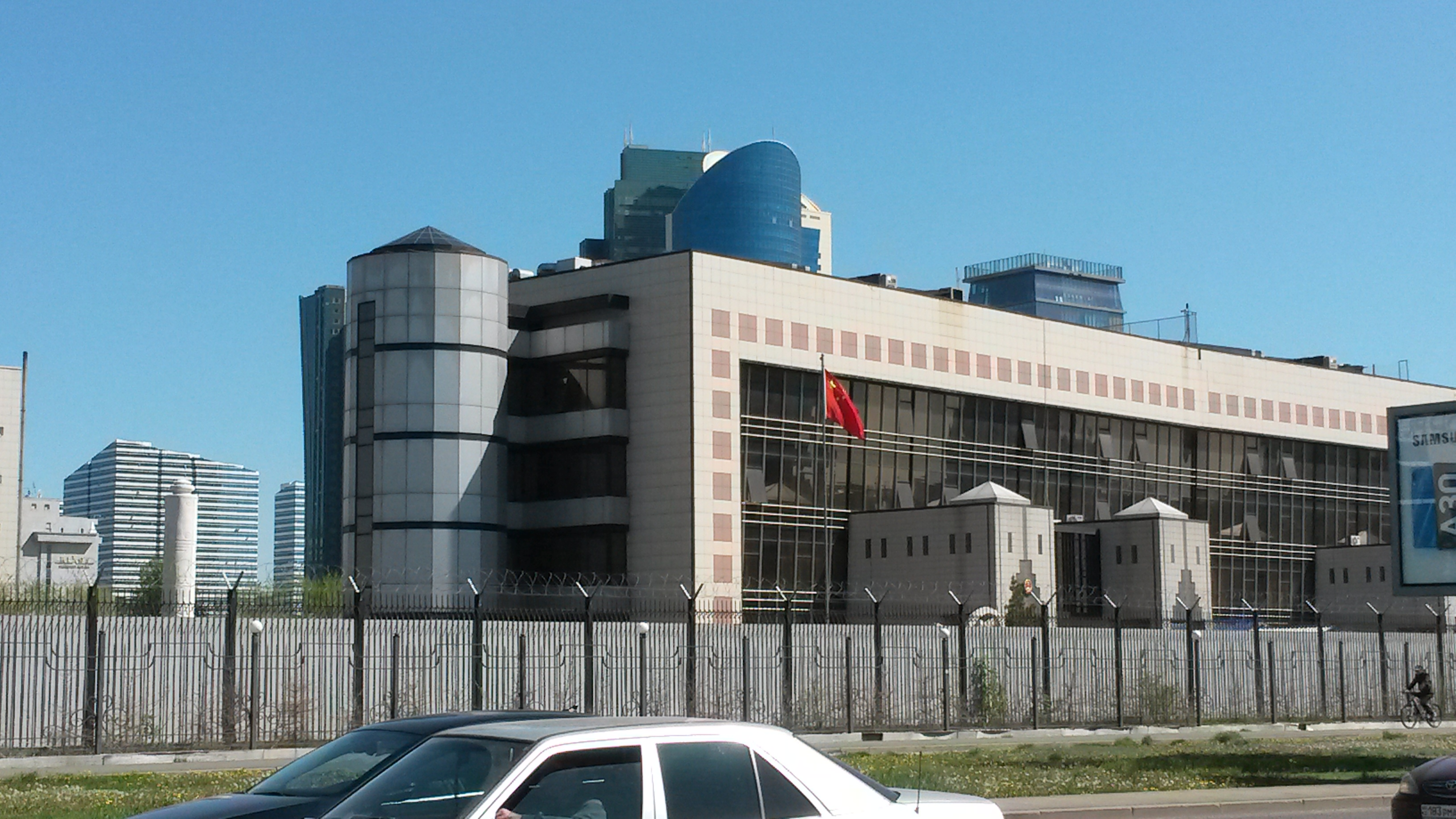
Embassy of China in Astana

== See also ==
- Foreign relations of China
- Foreign relations of Kazakhstan

== Bibliography ==
- Cardenal, Juan Pablo; Araújo, Heriberto (2011). La silenciosa conquista china (in Spanish). Barcelona: Crítica. pp. 59–70. ISBN 9788498922578.
- Jin Noda (6 April 2016). The Kazakh Khanates between the Russian and Qing Empires: Central Eurasian International Relations during the Eighteenth and Nineteenth Centuries. BRILL. ISBN 978-90-04-31447-4.
- Noda, Jin; Onuma, Takahiro (2010). "A Collection of Documents from the Kazakh Sultans to the Qing Dynasty". Crosroads. TIAS Central Eurasian Research Series (Special Issue 1). Department of Islamic Area Studies, Center for Evolving Humanities, Graduate School of Humanities and Sociology, The University of Tokyo: i-176. ISBN 978-4-904039-17-5.
- Nurlan, Kenzheakhmet (October 2013). "The Qazaq Khanate as Documented in Ming Dynasty Sources". Crosroads (8): 131–156.
- Smagulova, Anar. "XVIII – XIX Centuries. In the Manuscripts of the Kazakhs of China". Ust-Kamenogorsk, Kazakhstan: East Kazakhstan State University.
