= Terekty River =

Terekty (Kusak) Теректi / 铁列克提河
- Mouth location in Kazakhstan Terekty River (China)

Location
- Countries: China, Kazakhstan

Physical characteristics
- Source: Kertau
  - coordinates: 45°46′00″N 82°47′00″E
- Mouth: Zhalanashkol
  - coordinates: 45°36′00″N 82°10′00″E

The Terekty River (Kazakh: Теректi өзенi, Russian: река Теректы), also known under the Sinified spelling Tielieketi (Chinese: 铁列克提河; pinyin: Tiělièkètí hé), is a small river that flows from China to Kazakhstan. In its lower course the river is also known as the Kusak (Kazakh: Қусақ, Russian: Кусак, Chinese: 库萨克; pinyin: Kùsàkè). Along most of its course, the river flows through the very sparsely populated mountainous terrain of the southern part of Xinjiang's Yumin County; by the time it crosses the China–Kazakhstan border and enters a flat desert east of Lake Zhalanashkol, its bed is usually dry, with little water ever reaching Lake Zhalanashkol.

The Terekty is mainly known as the site of a Sino-Soviet border conflict that occurred in August 1969.

== Geography ==
According to topographic maps, the Terekty rises in the Kertau or Barlik (巴尔鲁克) Mountains at around 45°46′00″N 82°47′00″E. After flowing to the south for some 20 km, and receiving several tributaries at around 45°39′00″N 82°46′00″E, the Terekty turns west and flows in a narrow valley until it reaches the Alakol-Zhalanashkol depression. Once entering the plain east of Lake Zhalanashkol at around 45°37′00″N 82°18′00″E, the river forms a large alluvial fan. In this area, the water flow is seasonal, the river bed being dry most of the year. The (usually dry) "delta" of the Terekty (Kusak) reaches the northeastern corner of Lake Zhalanashkol around 45°36′00″N 82°10′00″E.

A joint Sino-Kazakh boundary commission which demarcated the modern China–Kazakhstan border (defined by a bilateral treaty signed in 1994) installed two border monuments on both sides of the Terekty (Kusak) River to mark the exact line of the border as it crosses the river. According to the commission's protocol, granite monument no. 241/1, installed on the right (northern) side of the river is situated at 45°37′05.3″N 82°15′37.4″E; reinforced concrete monument No. 242, on the river left (southern) side is at 45°36′57.3″N 82°15′32.2″E; the distance between the two monuments is 285.8 m.

== Meaning of the name, and its other uses ==
Terekty (Kazakh: теректi) is a Kazakh adjective derived from terek (Kazakh: терек). Thus, "Terekty River" (Kazakh: Теректi өзенi) means "Poplar River" (compare the Baiyang River, elsewhere in Xinjiang, whose name means the same in Chinese).

"Terekty" is a fairly common place name in Kazakhstan, used (by itself or in combination with a modifier) for a number of villages, at least one other river, and a mountain pass elsewhere in the country.

== See also ==
- List of rivers of Kazakhstan
- China–Kazakhstan border
