= Kereykhan Amanzholov =

Kazakh historian and military scientist (1926–2006)

- Born: Kereykhan Rakhimzhanuly Amanzholov; July 22, 1926; Zaysan District, East Kazakhstan Region, Kazak ASSR
- Died: July 17, 2006 (aged 79); Almaty, Kazakhstan
- Education: Leningrad Higher Military-Political School; Al-Farabi Kazakh National University
- Occupations: Historian, professor
- Known for: Research on Turkic military history
- Title: Doctor of Historical Sciences, Professor
- Awards: Order of Parasat

Kereykhan Rakhimzhanuly Amanzholov (Kazakh: Керейхан Рахымжанұлы Аманжолов; July 22, 1926 – July 17, 2006) was a prominent Kazakh historian, Doctor of Historical Sciences, and professor. He is recognized as the first military academician of Kazakhstan and was a member of the Russian Academy of Military Sciences.

== Biography ==
Kereykhan Amanzholov was born in 1926 in the Zaysan District of East Kazakhstan. He received his military education at the Leningrad Higher Military-Political School and later graduated from the History Faculty of the Al-Farabi Kazakh National University.

From 1975 to 1995, he served as the Head of the History Department at the Kazakh National Women's Teacher Training University. In 1995, he became a Professor of Political Science at the same institution. Amanzholov specialized in the military history of the Turkic peoples and the evolution of military arts in Central Asia. His research extensively covered the historical conflicts and military strategies of the Kazakh Khanate, contributing to the academic understanding of nomadic warfare and the historical foundations of Kazakh statehood.

== Scientific works ==
Amanzholov authored over 400 scientific articles and 20 monographs. His most notable works include:

- History of the Turkic Peoples (3 volumes, 1996–2005)
- Military History of Kazakhstan (1999)
- Explanatory Dictionary of Kazakh Military Terms (1999)
- Military Art of the Sakas (2000)

== Awards and honors ==
- Order of Parasat
- Medal "For the Victory over Germany in the Great Patriotic War 1941–1945"
- Medal "For Combat Merit"
- Honorary Citizen of Zaysan District
