= China–Kazakhstan border =

International border in Asia

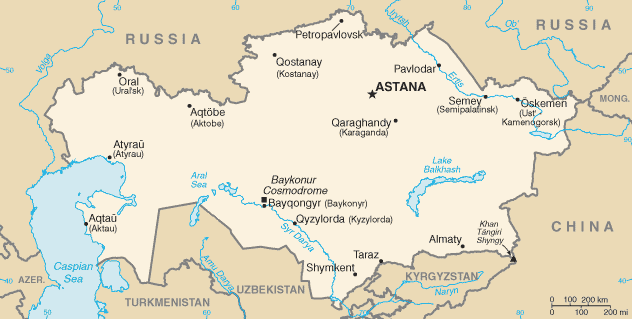
Map of Kazakhstan with China to the east

Chinese and Kazakhstani boundary markers

The China–Kazakhstan border (Kazakh: Қазақстан–Қытай мемлекеттiк шекарасы, romanized: Qazaqstan–Qytai memlekettık şekarasy; Chinese: 中哈边界; pinyin: Zhōnghā biānjiè; Dungan: Җунгуй–Хазахстан бянҗе), also known as the Sino-Kazakh border, is the international border between the People's Republic of China and the Republic of Kazakhstan.

The border line between the two countries has been largely inherited from the border existing between the Soviet Union and the PRC and, earlier, between the Russian Empire and the Qing Empire; however, it has been fully demarcated only in the late 20th and early 21st century. According to the international boundary commissions that have carried out the border demarcation, the border is 1,782.75 km (1,107.75 mi) long.

== History ==
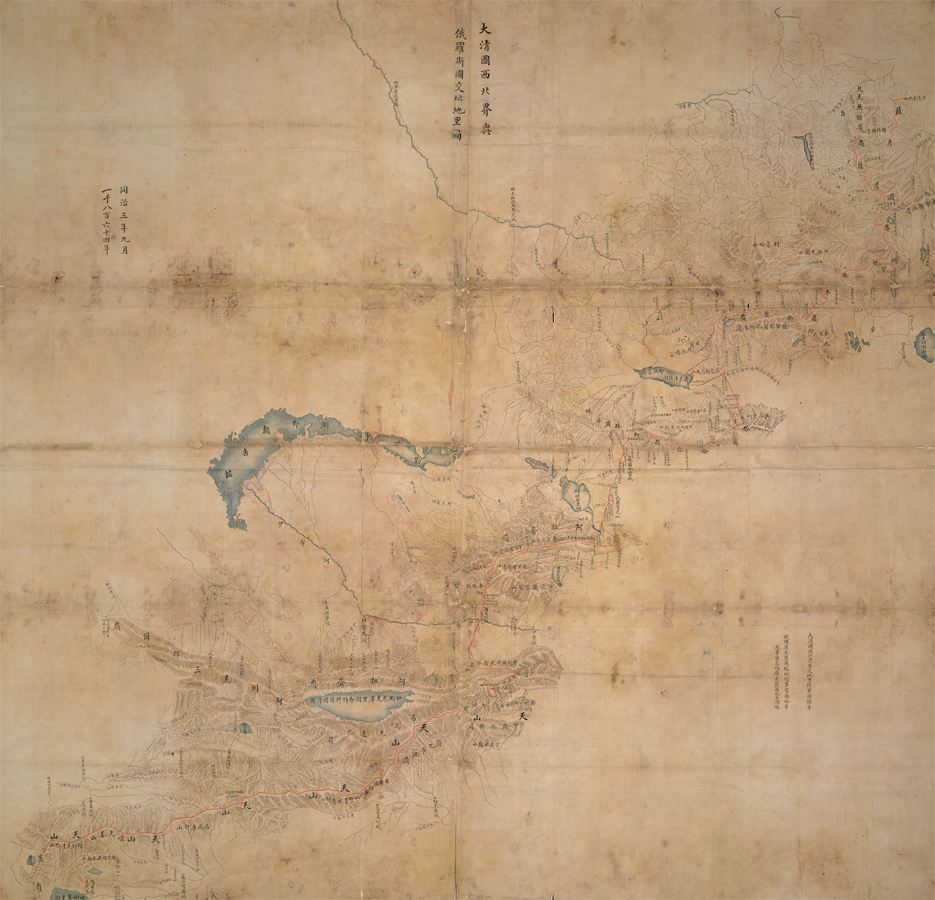
The Sino-Russian border set forth in the Protocol of Chuguchak (1864). Today's Sino-Kazakh border largely follows the line set in this protocol, with only fairly small changes

The origins of the border date from the mid-19th century, when the Russian Empire expanded into Central Asia and was able to establish its control over the Lake Zaysan region. The establishment of the border between the Russian Empire and the Qing Empire, not too different from today's Sino-Kazakh/Kyrgyz/Tajik border was provided for in the Convention of Peking of 1860; the actual border line pursuant to the convention was drawn by the Treaty of Tarbagatai (1864) and the Treaty of Uliassuhai (1870), leaving Lake Zaysan on the Russian side. The Qing Empire's military presence in the Irtysh basin crumbled during the Dungan revolt (1862–77). After the fall of the rebellion and the reconquest of Xinjiang by Zuo Zongtang, the border between the Russian and the Qing empires in the Ili River basin was further slightly readjusted, in Russia's favour, by the Treaty of Saint Petersburg (1881) and a series of later protocols. In 1915 an agreement was signed more precisely delimiting the border in the Ili Valley and Dzungarian Alatau region.

The southernmost section of the frontier (i.e. roughly the southern half of the modern China–Tajikistan border) remained undemarcated, owing partly to the ongoing rivalry between Britain and Russia for dominance in Central Asia known as the Great Game; eventually the two agreed that Afghanistan would remain an independent buffer state between them, with Afghanistan's Wakhan Corridor being created in 1895. China was not a party to these agreement and hence the southernmost section of the China-Russia boundary remained undefined.

After the Xinhai Revolution and the Chinese Civil War in China and the October Revolution and the Russian Civil War in Russia, the Sino-Russian border became the PRC-USSR border. During Joseph Stalin's collectivization and sedentarization policies beginning with the First Five-Year Plan and resulting in the Kazakh famine, large numbers of nomads from Soviet Central Asia fled across the border to Xinjiang. However, the Chinese and Soviet authorities were not always in agreement where the border line ran on the ground, which led, in particular to a border conflict east of Lake Zhalanashkol in August 1969.

After Kazakhstan became an independent country, it negotiated a border treaty with China, which was signed in Almaty on April 26, 1994, and ratified by Kazakh President Nursultan Nazarbayev on June 15, 1995. According to the treaty, a narrow strip of hilly terrain east of Lake Zhalanashkol which the USSR and China had contested in 1969 has become recognized as part of China.

To delineate certain small sections of the border more precisely, additional agreements were signed on 24 September 1997 and 4 July 1998. Over the next several years, the border was demarcated on the ground by joint commissions. According to the commissions' protocols and maps, the two countries' border line is 1782.75 km long, including 1215.86 km of land border and 566.89 km of border line run along (or across) rivers or lakes. The commissions' work was documented by several joint protocols, finalized with the Protocol signed in Beijing on May 10, 2002. The agreements are not recognized by the government of the Republic of China on Taiwan.

In 2011 a cross-border free trade area opened on the border at Khorgos in an effort to boost Chinese-Kazakh trade.

== Border crossings ==
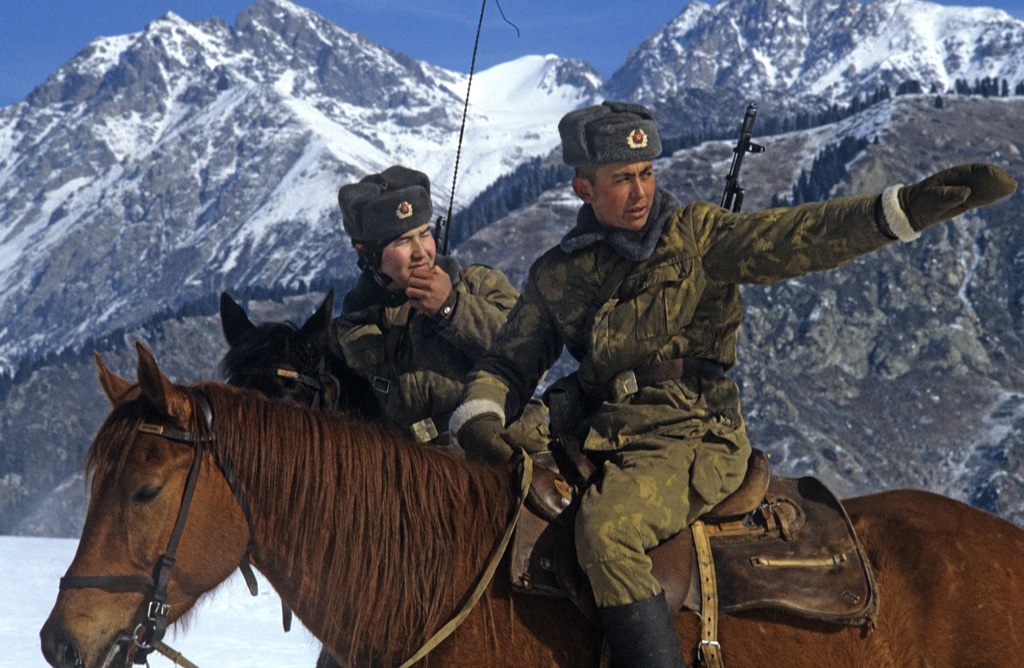
Soviet border guards patrolling the USSR-China border (now Kazakhstan-China border) near Khorgos, 1984

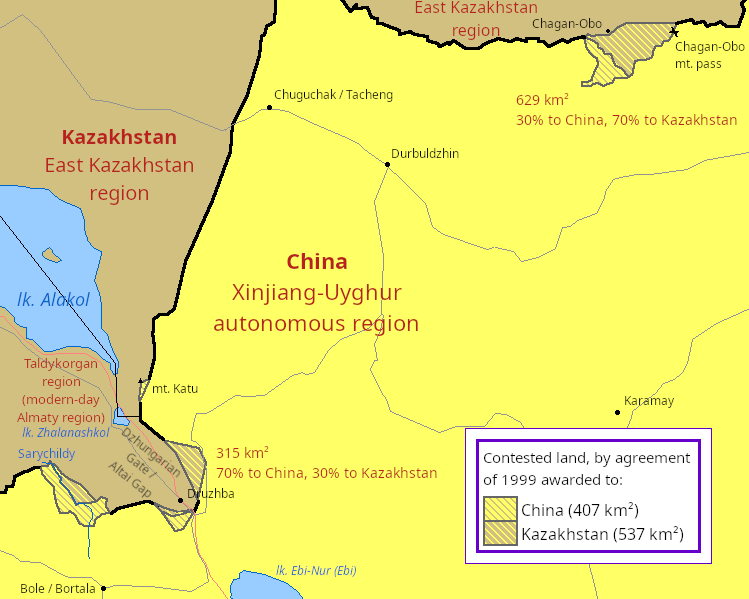
Changes in the border between Kazakhstan and China, English

- Maykapshagay (KAZ) – Jeminay (CHN) (road:M-38, S319)
- Bakhty (KAZ) – Tacheng (CHN) (road:A-356, S221)
- Dostyk (KAZ) – Alashankou (CHN) (road:E014, G3018 / rail:Northern Xinjiang railway)
- Khorgos (KAZ) – Khorgas (CHN) (road:E012, G30 / rail:Jinghe–Yining–Khorgos railway)
- Kolzhat (KAZ) – Dulata (CHN) (road:A-352, S313)

== Settlements near the border ==
=== China ===
- Tacheng
- Huocheng
- Khorgos

=== Kazakhstan ===
- Alekseyeva
- Taunchang
- Akshoky
- Bakhty
- Dostyk
- Almaly
- Khorgos
- Kolzhat
- Sarybastau
- Sumbe
- Narynkol

== Historical maps ==
Historical maps of the China-Kazakh SSR border from north to south (west to east), mid & late 20th century:

International Map of the World:

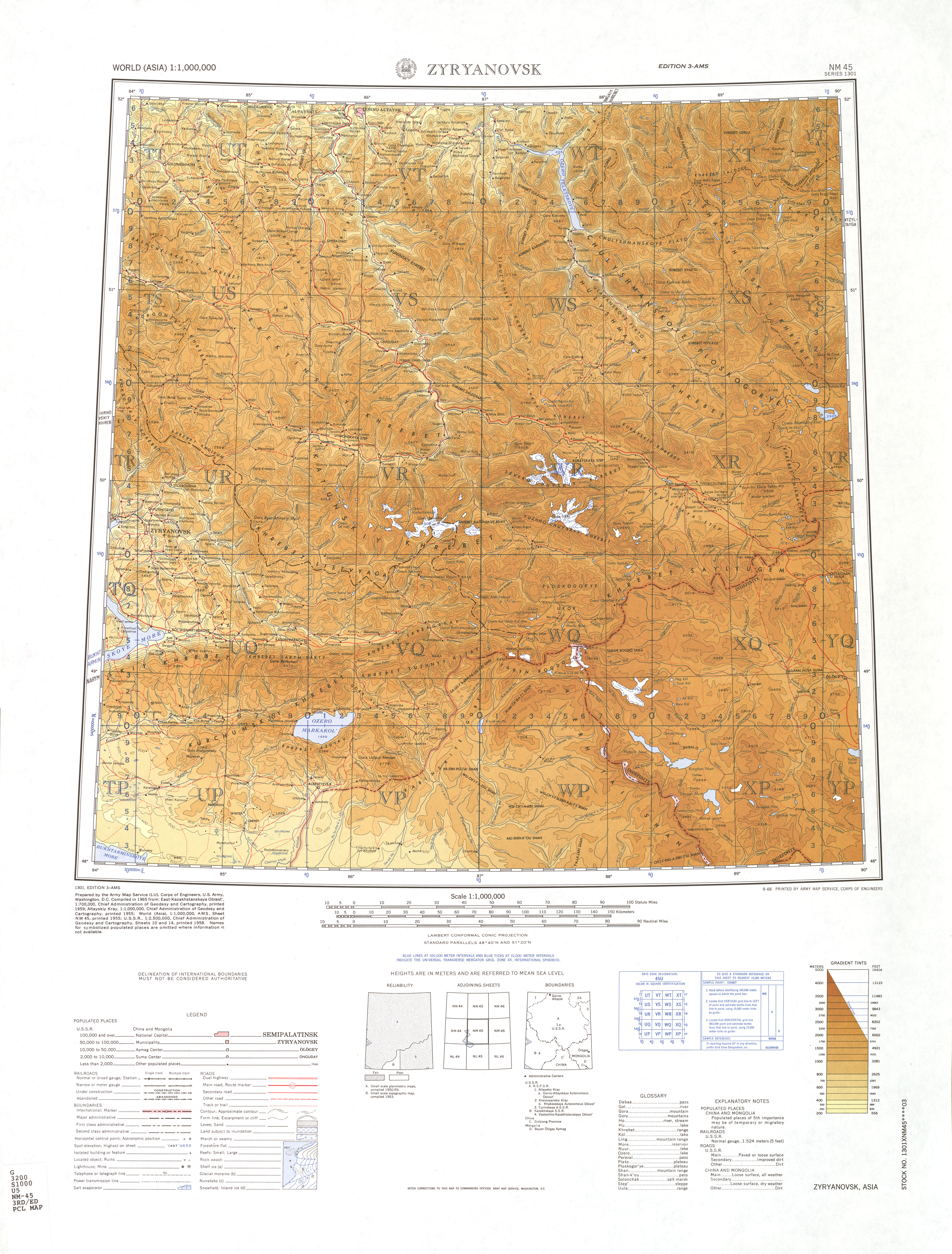
near Altai Town

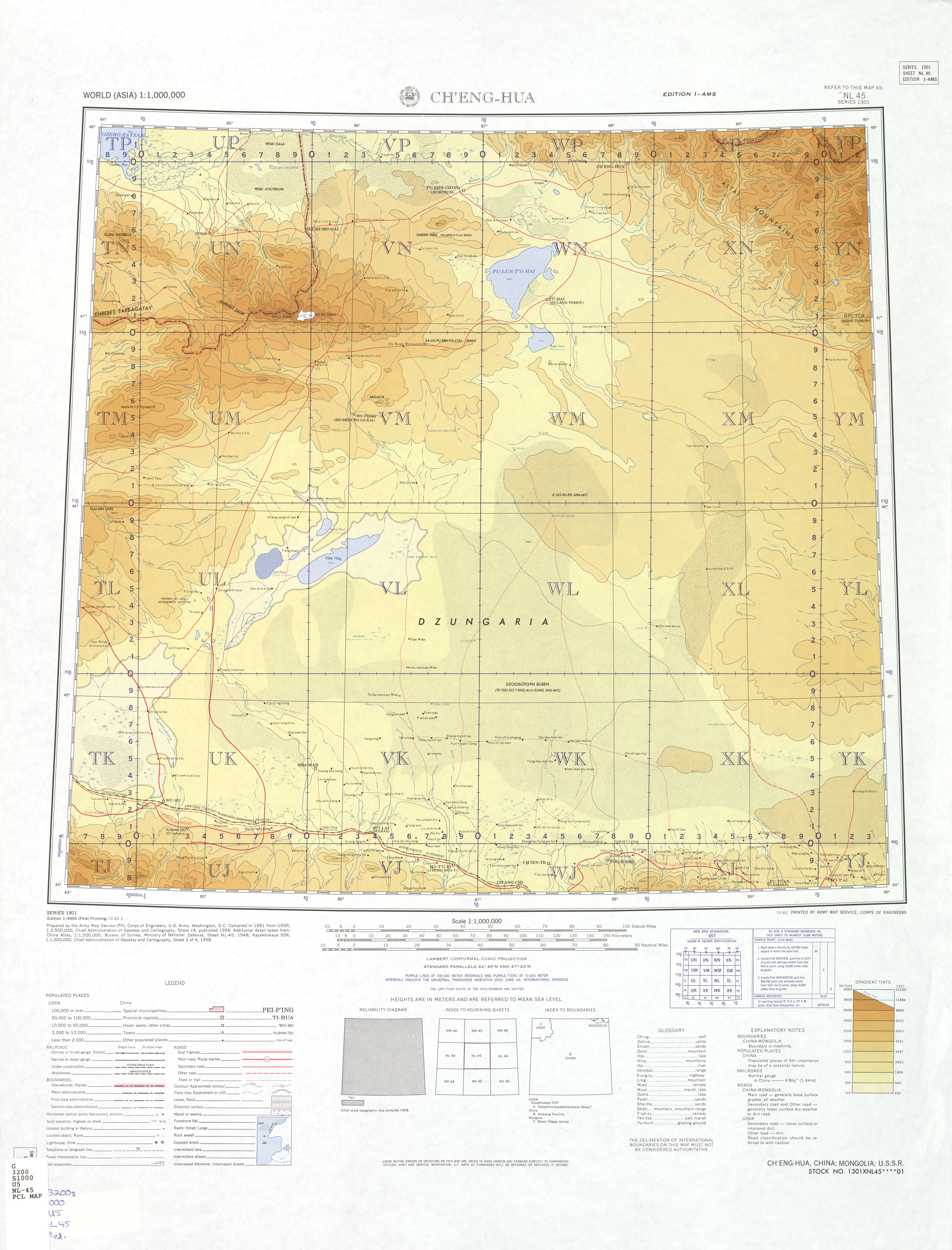
near Altay City

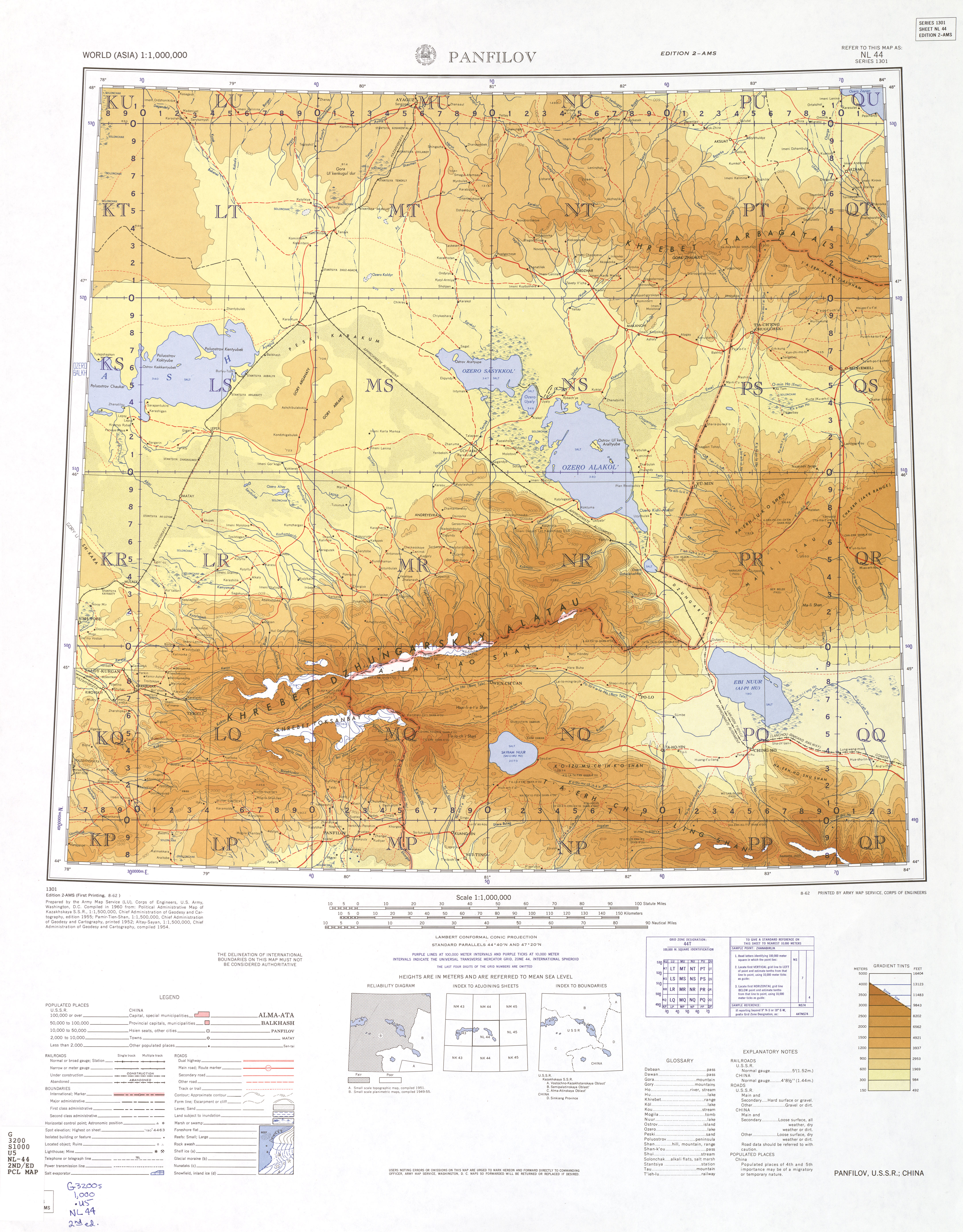
near Zharkent

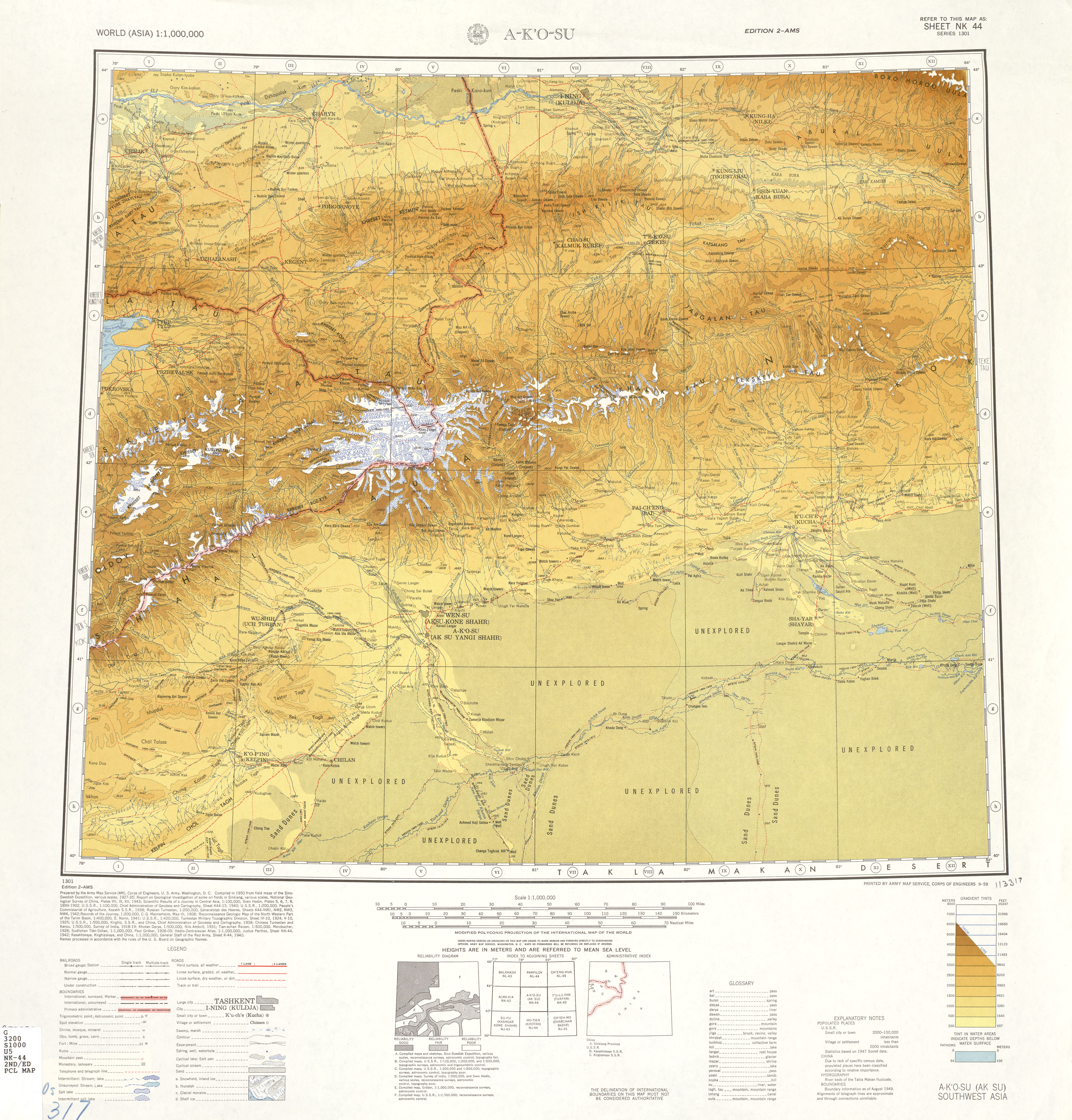
near Aksu City

Operational Navigation Chart:

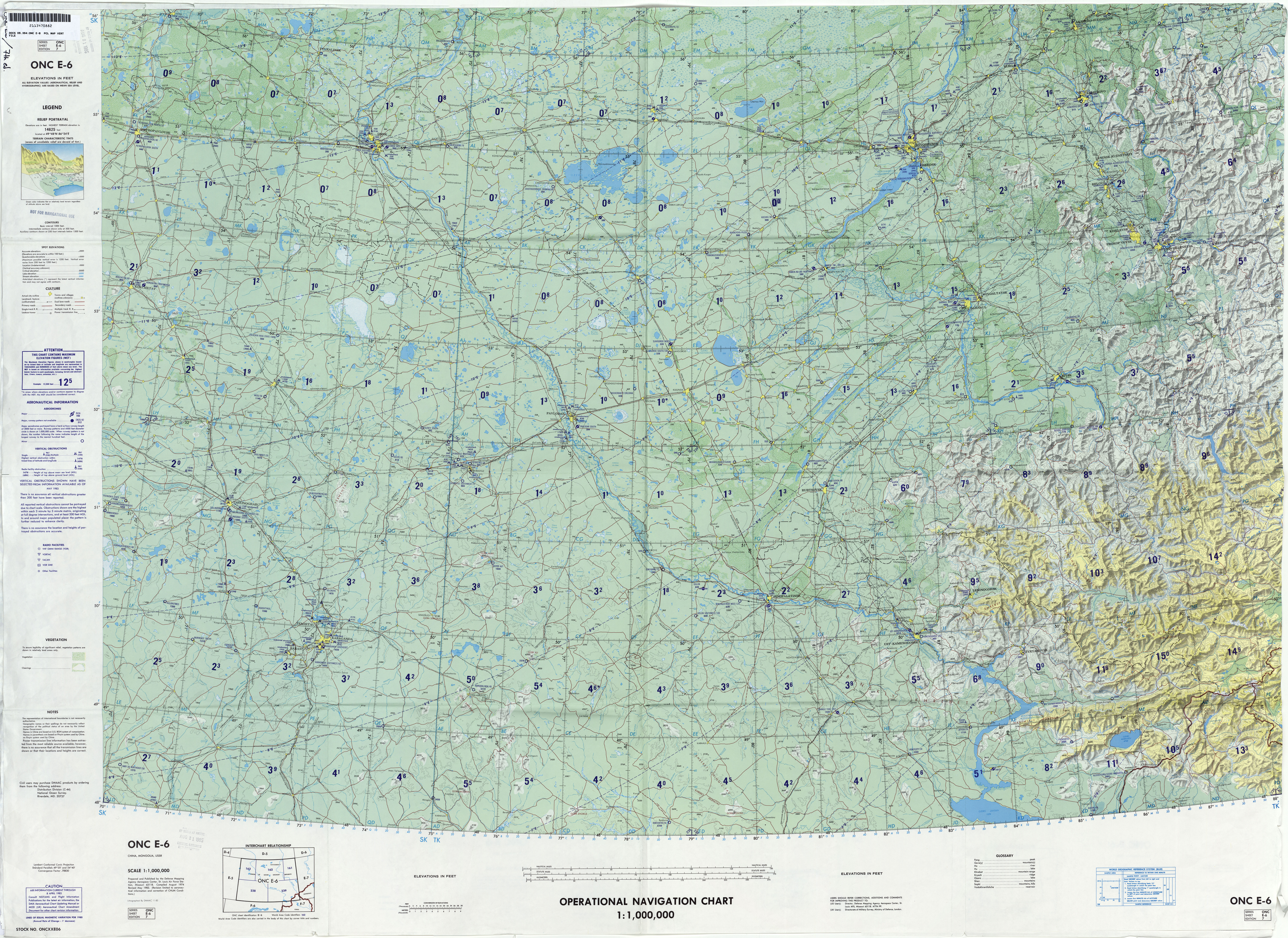
near Russian SFSR (modern-day Russia)

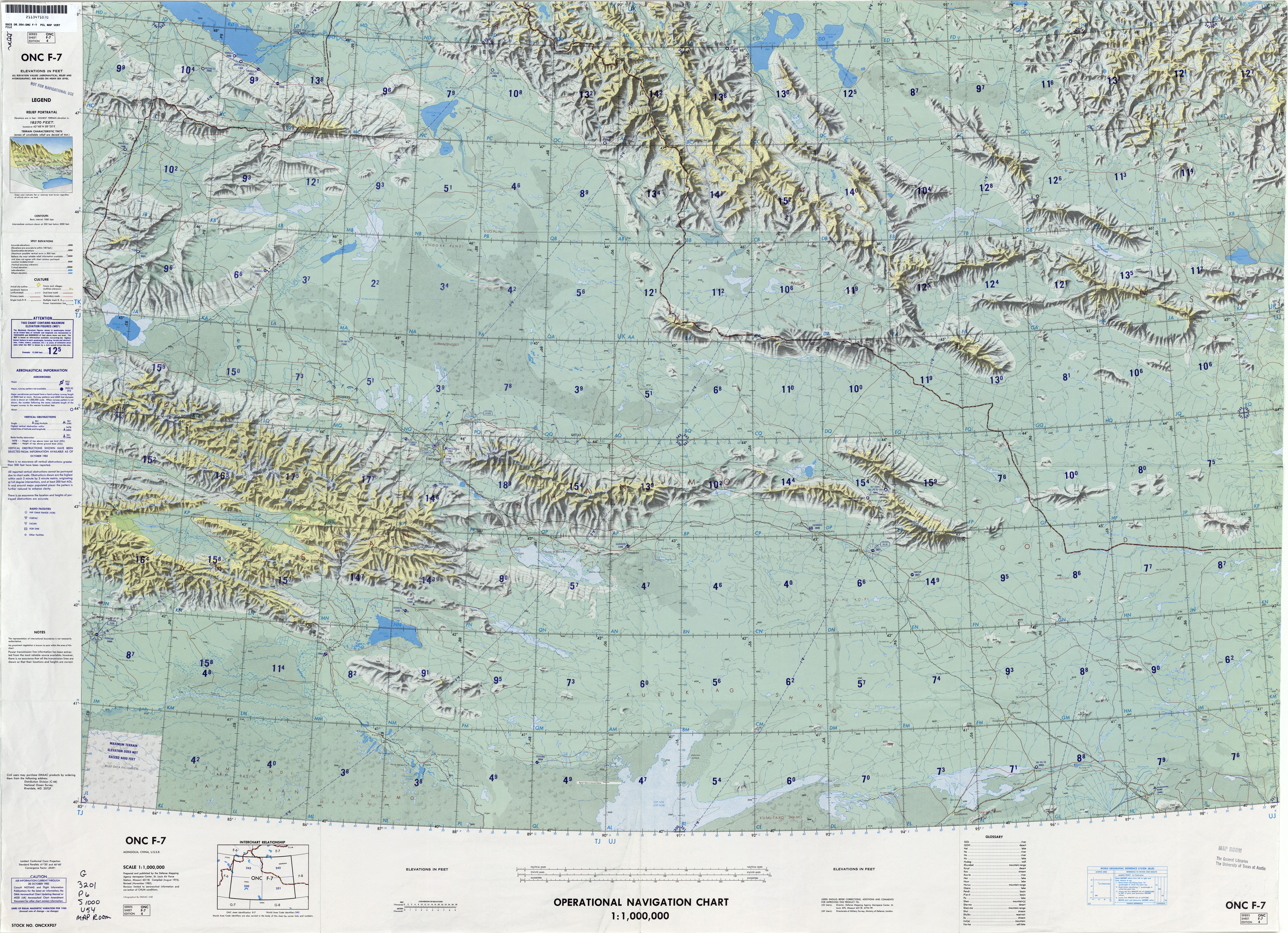

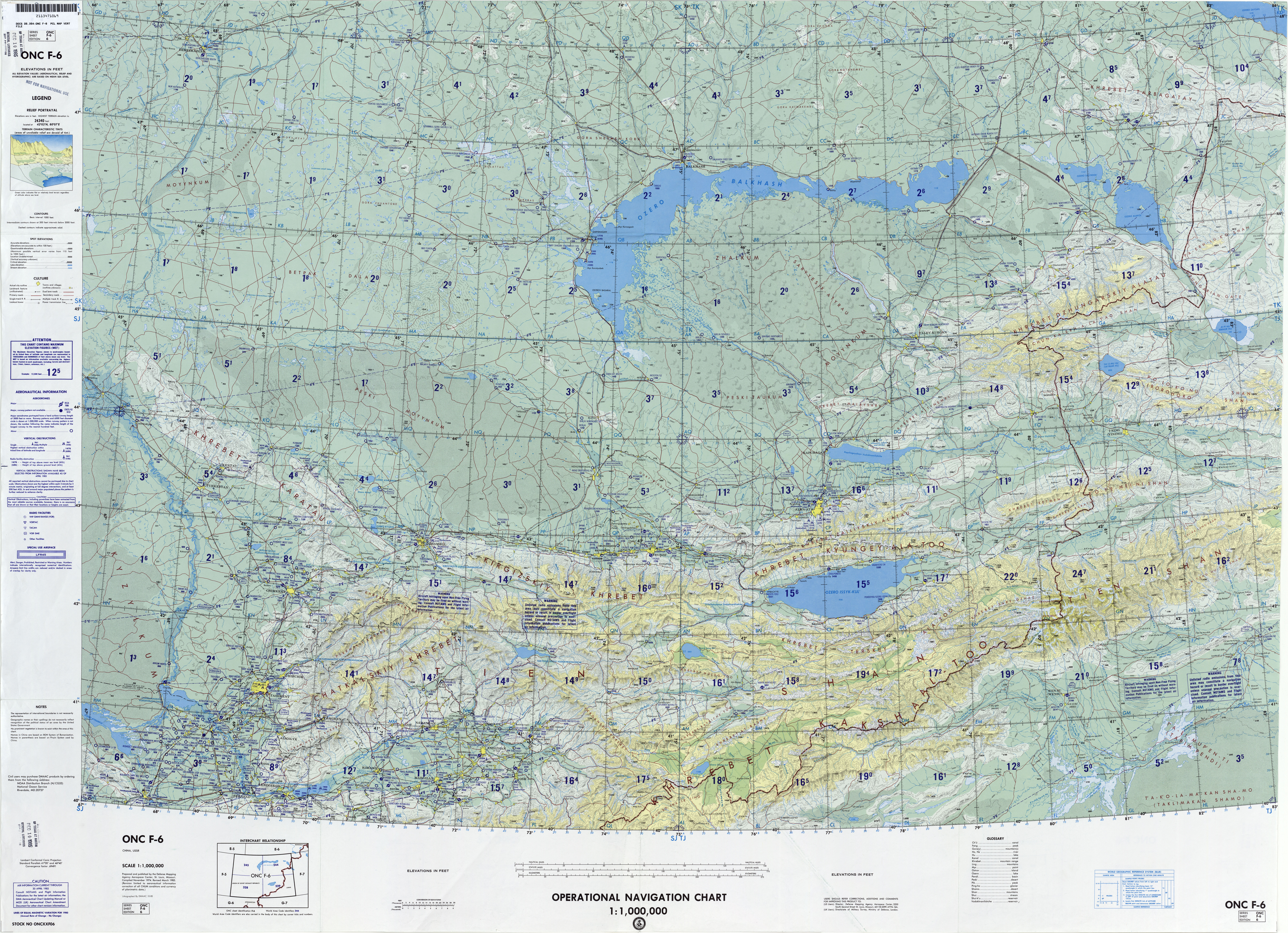
near Kirghiz SSR (modern-day Kyrgyzstan)

Tactical Pilotage Chart:

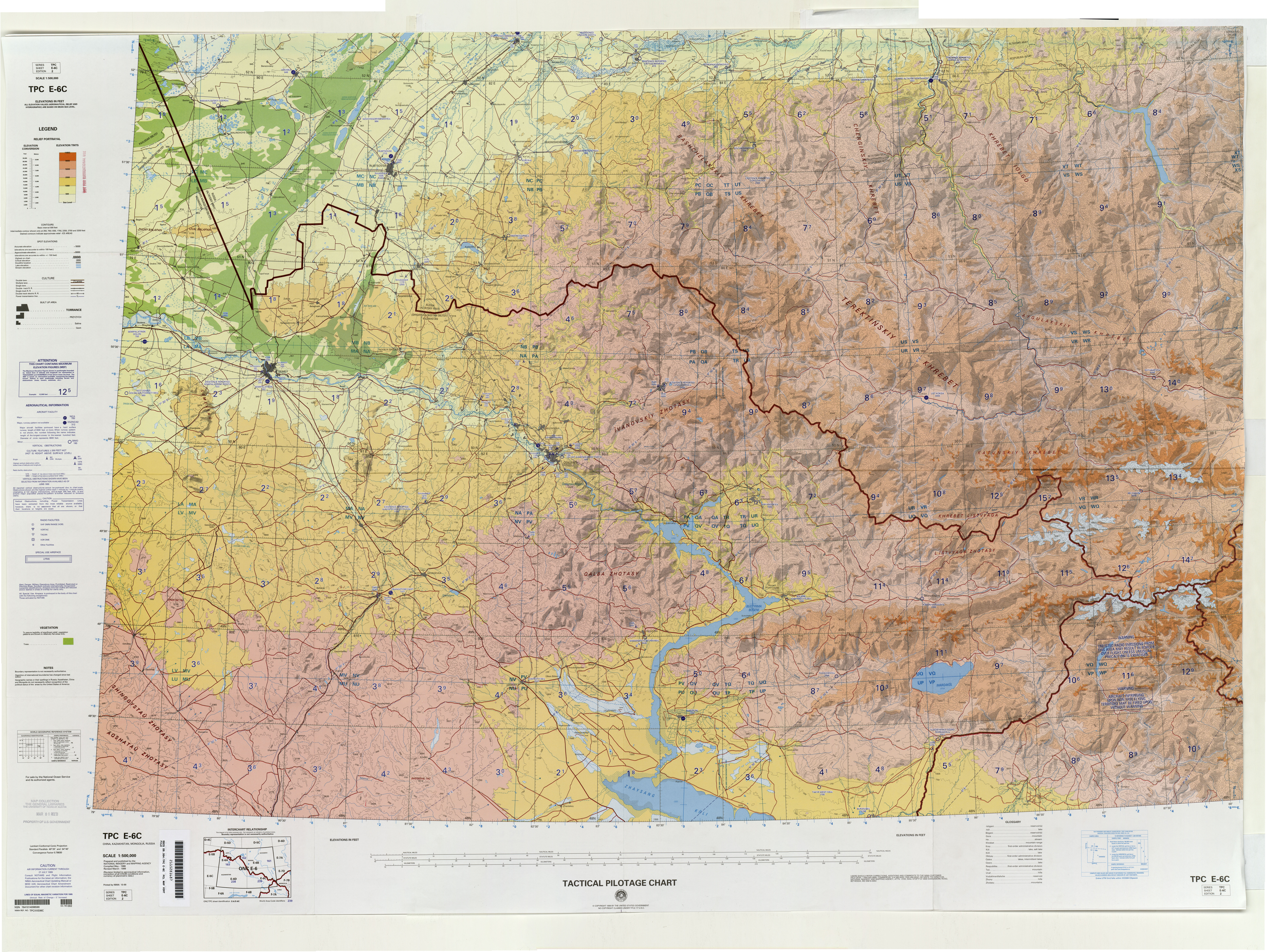

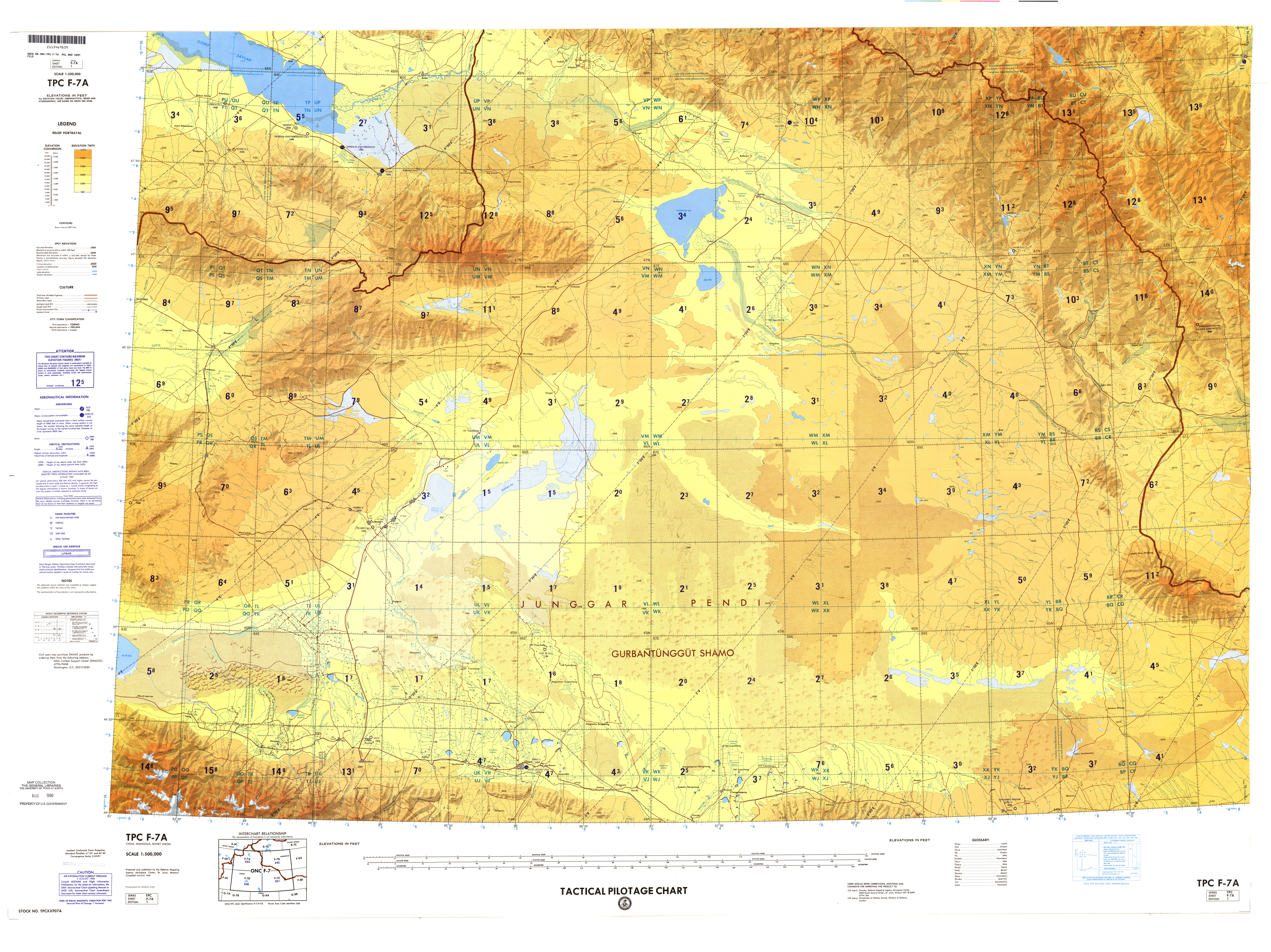

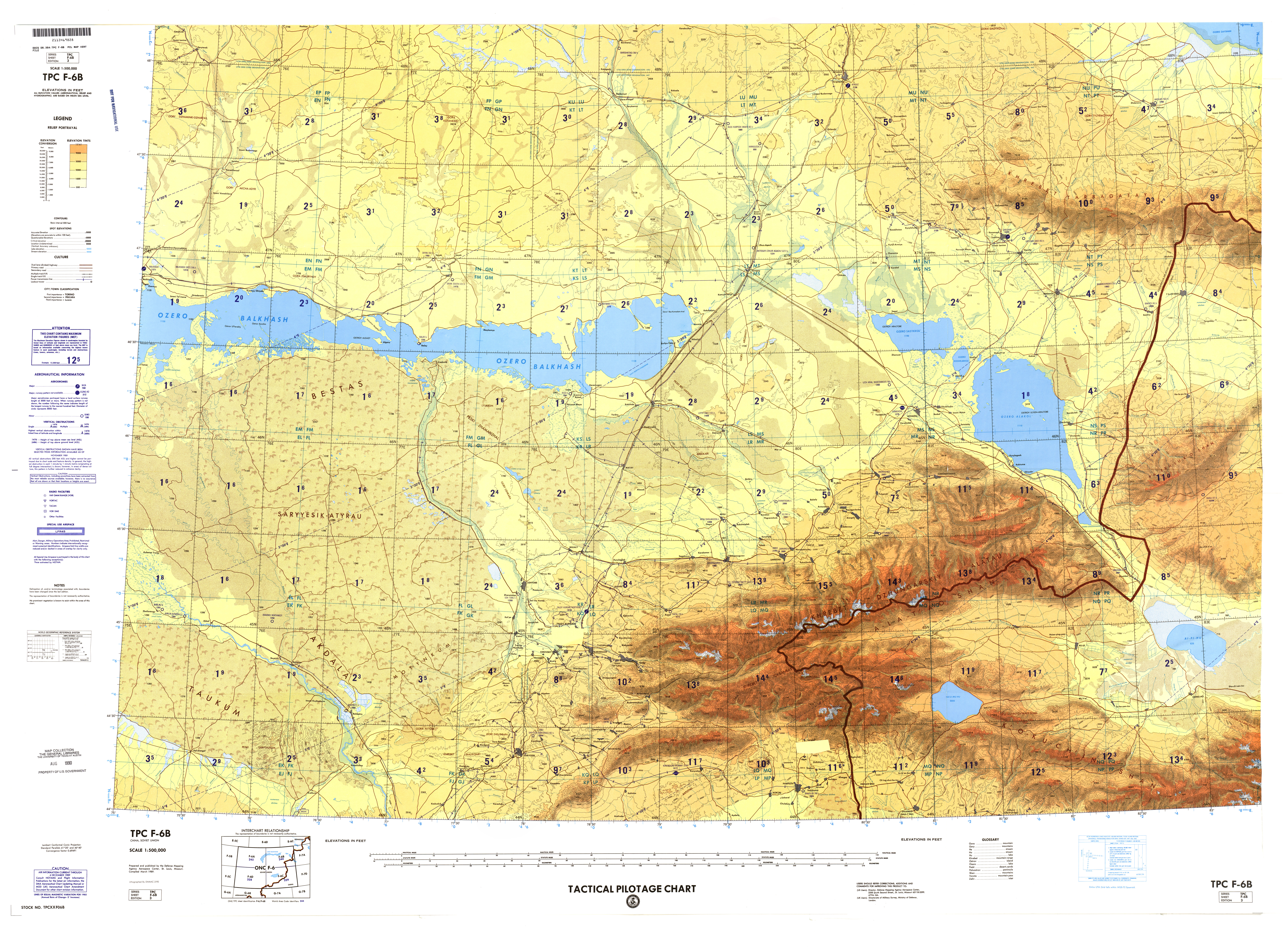

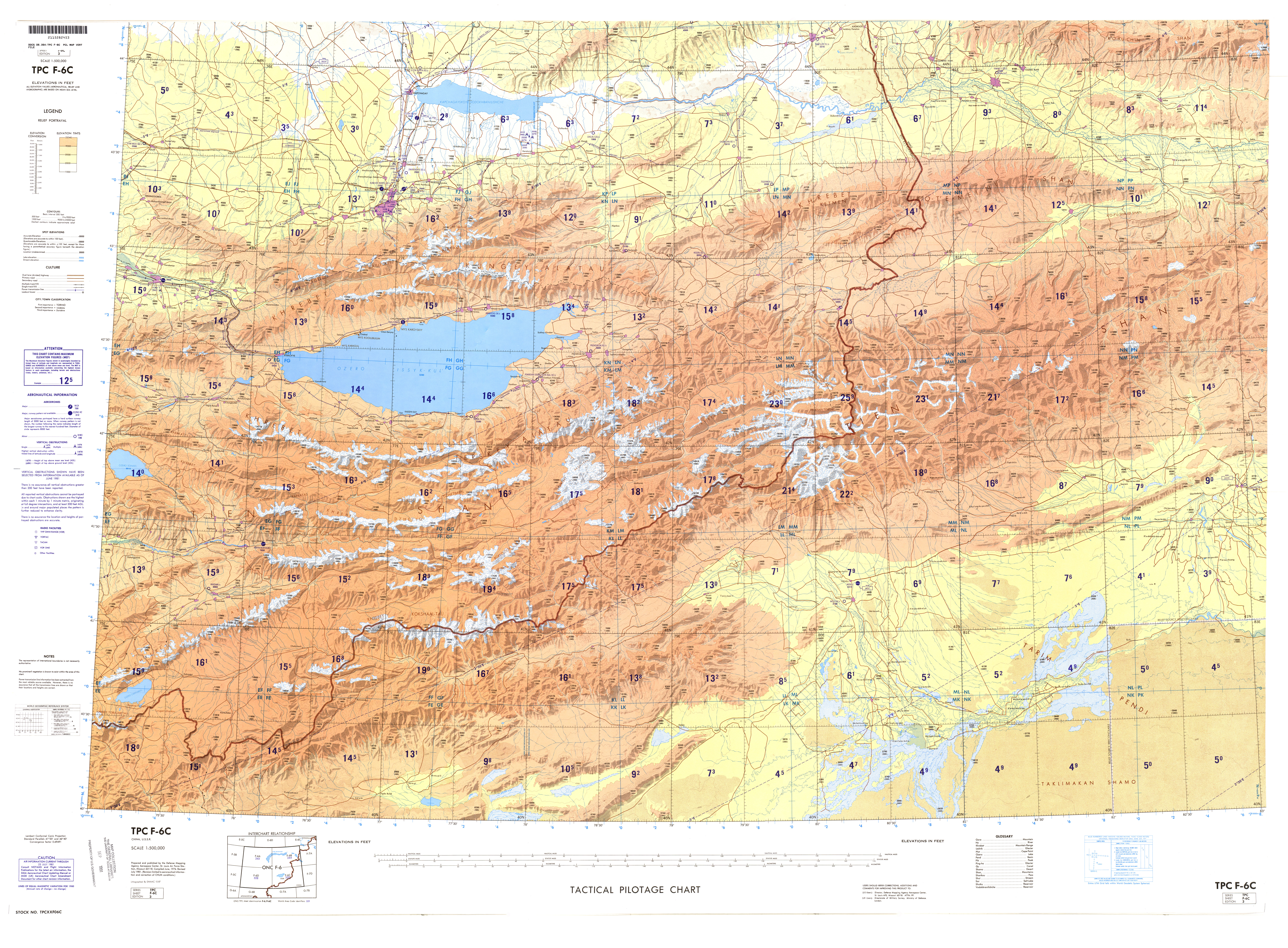

== See also ==
- Ports of entry of China
- China–Kazakhstan relations
- Border Service of the National Security Committee of the Republic of Kazakhstan
