= Kalakai Sanctuary =

The Kalakai Sanctuary is an ancient structure located on a small plateau in the Biyen River valley of the Dzungar Alatau, near the China–Kazakhstan border.

== Description ==
The Kalakai Sanctuary was built from boulders of various sizes to form a circle 97 metres (106 yd) in diameter. There is a large boulder in the centre of the sanctuary that is believed to have been deposited when an ancient glacier receded. Within the circle, several large stones have been placed to resemble a sundial, pointing to the four cardinal directions. The monument dates to the first millennium BC. Some suggest it may be older, referencing images painted on the central boulder resembling Bronze Age cave paintings. However, no reliable evidence has been found to support this claim and the paintings, as well as the sanctuary, are believed to have been made by the nomadic Saka peoples. Mounds built by the Saka have also been found nearby, but they are believed to be unrelated.

The paintings on the central boulder feature mountain sheep with curved horns. The development of the sanctuary is believed to coincide with the formation of the Saka tribal unions and their transition to a state with a hereditary ruler.

Scientists believe that the sanctuary may have been used as a clock and calendar, which is why it is referred to as "The Observatory". In ancient times, the sanctuary may have been used to calculate the time of day, equinoxes and the arrival of new seasons.
