= Maykapshagay =

Maykapshagay Майкапшагай
- Location within Kazakhstan
- Coordinates: 47°29′38″N 85°36′29″E
- Country: Kazakhstan
- Region: East Kazakhstan Region
- Time zone: UTC+6 (OMST)
  - Summer (DST): UTC+7 (OMSST)

Maykapshagay (Kazakh: Майкапшагай, Maikapşagai) is a Kazakh border post along the international border with China. It is located in the Zaysan District of East Kazakhstan Region across from the Chinese town of Jeminay in the far northern part of Xinjiang.

Maykapshagay is notable for being the terminus of European route E127, making it the easternmost point in the European route system at 85°36' E. The road connects Maykapshagay with the Russian city of Omsk, 1,330 kilometers to the northwest, as well as the rest of the European route system. The border post is located near the center of the Eurasian landmass and roughly 150 kilometers from the point on Earth furthest from the ocean. The nearest town, Zaysan, is 66 kilometers to the west along E127, while a smaller settlement, Karatal, is located roughly half-way to Zaysan.

As of 2019, the roadway carrying E127 is set to undergo reconstruction from the border post at Maykapshagay to the town of Kalbatau in Zharma District, 415 km distant.
