= E127 =

E127 may refer to:

- E127 series, a Japanese train type
- Erythrosine, a food additive
- Ikarus E127, a Hungarian low-floor suburban bus
- European route E127 in Siberia and Kazakhstan
- Element 127, unbiseptium, a predicted chemical element; see Extended periodic table § Superactinides
