= Jeminay County =

Jeminay County 吉木乃县 (Chinese) جېمىنەي ناھىيىسى (Uyghur) جەمەنەي اۋدانى (Kazakh) Jimunai
- County
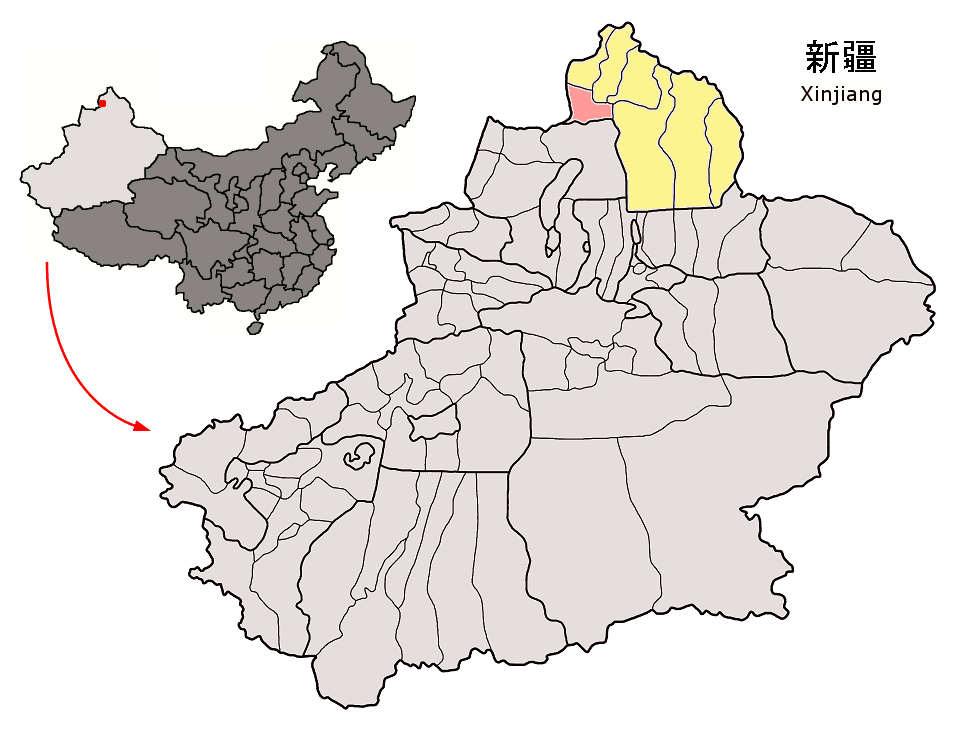
- Location of Jeminay County (red) within Altay Prefecture (yellow) and Xinjiang

- Location of the county town in Xinjiang Jeminay (Xinjiang) Jeminay (China)
- Coordinates: 47.443°N 85.874°E
- Country: China
- Autonomous region: Xinjiang
- Prefecture: Altay
- County seat: Topterek

Area
  - Total: 7,145.8 km^{2} (2,759.0 sq mi)

Population (2020)
  - Total: 34,336
  - Density: 4.8051/km^{2} (12.445/sq mi)
- Time zone: UTC+8 (China Standard (Note: Locals in Xinjiang frequently observe UTC+6 (Xinjiang Time), 2 hours behind Beijing.))
- Website: www.jmn.gov.cn

Jeminay County

Chinese name
- Simplified Chinese: 吉木乃县
- Traditional Chinese: 吉木乃縣
Transcriptions
Standard Mandarin
- Hanyu Pinyin: Jímùnǎi Xiàn

Uyghur name
- Uyghur: جېمىنەي ناھىيىسى
Transcriptions
- Latin Yëziqi: Jëminey Nahiyisi
- Yengi Yeziⱪ: Jeminəy naⱨiyisi
- SASM/GNC: Jeminay Nahiyisi
- Siril Yëziqi: Җеминәй Наһийиси

Kazakh name
- Kazakh: جەمەنەي اۋدانى Kazakh Cyrillic: Жеменей ауданы Kazakh Latin alphabet: Jemeneı aýdany

Jeminay County or Jimunai County, is a county situated in the north of the Xinjiang Uyghur Autonomous Region and is under the administration of the Altay Prefecture.

A road border crossing into Kazakhstan is located in Jeminay town. The Kazakh settlement across the border is Maykapshagay near Zaysan in East Kazakhstan Region.

== Administrative divisions ==
Jeminay County is divided into 4 towns, 3 townships.

Name	Simplified Chinese	Hanyu Pinyin	Uyghur (UEY)	Uyghur Latin (ULY)	Kazakh (Arabic script)	Kazakh (Cyrillic script)	Administrative division code	Notes
Towns
Topterek Town	托普铁热克镇	Tuōpǔtiěrèkè Zhèn	توپتېرەك بازىرى	toptërek baziri	توپتەرەك قالاشىعى	Топтерек қалашығы	654326100	
Jeminay Town	吉木乃镇	Jímùnǎi Zhèn	جېمىنەي بازىرى	jëminey baziri	جەمەنەي قالاشىعى	Жеменей қалашығы	654326101	
Qarjaw Town (Kaerjiao Town)	喀尔交镇	Kā'ěrjiāo Zhèn	قارجاۋ بازىرى	qarjaw baziri	قارجاۋ قالاشىعى	Қаржау қалашығы	654326102	Formerly Qarjaw Township (喀尔交乡)
Ulastay Town	乌拉斯特镇	Wūlāsītè Zhèn	ئۇلاستاي بازىرى	Ulastay baziri	ۇلاستى قالاشىعى	Ұласты қалашығы	654326103	Formerly Topterek Township (托普铁热克乡)
Townships
Tost Township	托斯特乡	Tuōsītè Xiāng	توست يېزىسى	tost yëzisi	توستى اۋىلى	Тосты ауылы	654326201	
Shalshikay Township	恰勒什海乡	Qiàlèshíhǎi Xiāng	شالشىقاي يېزىسى	shalshiqay yëzisi	شالشىقاي اۋىلى	Шалшықай ауылы	654326202	
Besterek Township	别斯铁热克乡	Biésītiěrèkè Xiāng	بېستېرەك يېزىسى	bëstërek yëzisi	بەستەرەك اۋىلى	Бестерек ауылы	654326204	

- Others
  - XPCC 186th Regiment (兵团一八六团, 186-تۇەن مەيدانى, 186-تۋان الاڭىنداعى)

== Demographics ==
The proportion of nationalities in Jeminay County, 2018
Nationality	Percentage
Kazakhs	64.4%
Han People	32.7%
Hui People	2.9%
Uyghurs	0.5%
Others	0%
Source of the population statistics :

== Population ==
Amongst the county's total population of 37,733, 19,090 of them were men while 18,643 were women. 13,209 people were Han Chinese while 24,524 belonged to the county's fifteen different ethnic minority groups. The Non-agricultural population has a total figure of 18,530 while the Farming population is 19,203; The Urban population accounts for 10,121 people. According to the 2005 census, the native ethnic Kazaks, accounted for more than sixty percent of the county's total population figure.

== Climate ==
Climate data for Jeminay, elevation 968 m (3,176 ft), (1991–2020 normals, extremes 1991–present)
Month	Jan	Feb	Mar	Apr	May	Jun	Jul	Aug	Sep	Oct	Nov	Dec	Year
Record high °C (°F)	9.1 (48.4)	9.0 (48.2)	19.1 (66.4)	29.6 (85.3)	33.0 (91.4)	34.9 (94.8)	39.5 (103.1)	37.2 (99.0)	34.5 (94.1)	26.6 (79.9)	20.7 (69.3)	8.9 (48.0)	39.5 (103.1)
Mean daily maximum °C (°F)	−6.7 (19.9)	−3.8 (25.2)	2.4 (36.3)	13.2 (55.8)	19.8 (67.6)	25.0 (77.0)	26.9 (80.4)	25.6 (78.1)	19.4 (66.9)	11.0 (51.8)	1.1 (34.0)	−4.9 (23.2)	10.8 (51.4)
Daily mean °C (°F)	−12.5 (9.5)	−10.0 (14.0)	−3.2 (26.2)	7.2 (45.0)	13.7 (56.7)	19.3 (66.7)	21.1 (70.0)	19.6 (67.3)	13.2 (55.8)	5.3 (41.5)	−4.1 (24.6)	−10.2 (13.6)	5.0 (40.9)
Mean daily minimum °C (°F)	−16.8 (1.8)	−14.6 (5.7)	−7.6 (18.3)	2.3 (36.1)	8.5 (47.3)	14.2 (57.6)	16.1 (61.0)	14.7 (58.5)	8.3 (46.9)	1.0 (33.8)	−7.9 (17.8)	−14.3 (6.3)	0.3 (32.6)
Record low °C (°F)	−35.4 (−31.7)	−31.7 (−25.1)	−28.0 (−18.4)	−16.6 (2.1)	−4.8 (23.4)	2.1 (35.8)	6.8 (44.2)	1.5 (34.7)	−4.5 (23.9)	−15.6 (3.9)	−31.7 (−25.1)	−36.0 (−32.8)	−36.0 (−32.8)
Average precipitation mm (inches)	12.8 (0.50)	8.5 (0.33)	13.9 (0.55)	17.6 (0.69)	25.9 (1.02)	23.1 (0.91)	29.2 (1.15)	23.0 (0.91)	20.5 (0.81)	19.8 (0.78)	24.5 (0.96)	14.9 (0.59)	233.7 (9.2)
Average precipitation days (≥ 0.1 mm)	8.3	8.0	7.9	8.5	9.1	8.5	10.5	8.3	7.8	7.9	10.1	10.7	105.6
Average snowy days	10.1	10.3	9.2	4.4	1.4	0	0	0	0.8	5.5	11.5	12.6	65.8
Average relative humidity (%)	67	68	66	52	44	44	47	45	47	58	70	70	57
Mean monthly sunshine hours	157.4	177.8	242.8	262.8	309.6	306.6	305.3	305.4	260.0	206.5	146.2	130.7	2,811.1
Percentage possible sunshine	56	60	65	63	66	65	64	71	71	63	54	50	62
Source: China Meteorological Administration
