= Embassy of Kazakhstan, Beijing =

Coordinates: 39°56′43″N 116°27′28″E

Embassy of the Republic of Kazakhstan in Beijing Қазақстан Республикасының Бейжіңдегі елшілігі
- Location: Beijing, China
- Address: 9 Dong 6 Jie, Sanlitun, Chaoyang District, Beijing, 100600, China
- Ambassador: Shakhrat Nuryshev
- Jurisdiction: China
- Website: Official website

The Embassy of the Republic of Kazakhstan in Beijing (Kazakh: Қазақстан Республикасының Бейжіңдегі елшілігі) is the chief diplomatic mission of Kazakhstan in China. Located in Sanlitun, Chaoyang District, Beijing, the embassy facilitates political, economic, and cultural cooperation between Kazakhstan and China, and provides consular services to Kazakh citizens in China.

== History ==
Kazakhstan and China formally established diplomatic relations on 3 January 1992, shortly after Kazakhstan declared its independence. In December 1992, Kazakhstan established its embassy in Beijing, marking the beginning of direct diplomatic representation in the People's Republic of China. Murat Auezov was appointed as the first ambassador on 10 December 1992.

Since its founding, the embassy has played a role in the expansion of bilateral cooperation, including trade, investment, education, and infrastructure development. It has also supported high-level visits and state-to-state negotiations.

== See also ==
- China–Kazakhstan relations
- Foreign relations of Kazakhstan
- List of diplomatic missions of Kazakhstan
