= Tielieketi =

Place in Xinjiang, China

Coordinates: 45°35′00″N 82°17′00″E

Tielieketi (Chinese: 铁列克提) or Terekty (Kazakh: Теректi, Russian: Теректы) is located in Yumin County, Xinjiang, China, adjacent to the border with Kazakhstan. The name comes from the Terekty River, an intermittent stream which flows from China to Kazakhstan.

== Tielieketi incident ==
The Tielieketi military incident between Soviet and Chinese border troops (known in Soviet sources as "the border conflict near Lake Zhalanashkol" (Russian: пограничный конфликт у озера Жаланашколь) occurred on August 13, 1969, during the Sino-Soviet border conflict. The Soviet force eliminated a unit of about 30 Chinese soldiers, capturing four.

Soviet sources allege the August 13 clash between Soviet border guards and a Chinese force happened after persistent violation of the Chinese-Soviet border by Chinese soldiers starting the previous night. According to these sources, the Chinese military unit which took part in the incident was equipped with cameras and a professional video camera.

== Consequences ==
After the Soviet Union dissolved in 1990s, Tielieketi was administered by Kazakhstan. In 1999, China and Kazakhstan signed a joint declaration to resolve their long-term border issues, and Tielieketi was ceded to Xinjiang, China.
