= European route E127 =

Road in trans-European E-road network

E127
- Map of E127 in red
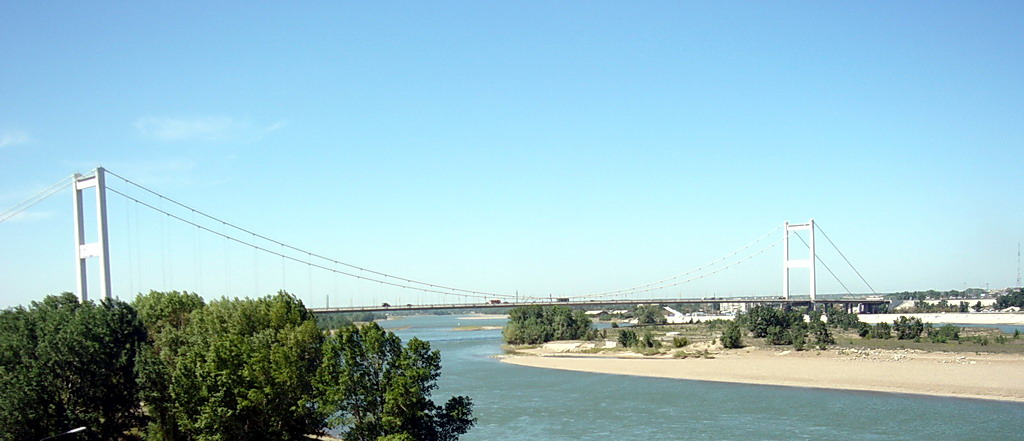
- Semey Bridge across Irtysh River on E127

Major junctions
- North end: Omsk, Russia
- South end: Maykapshagay, Kazakhstan

Location
- Countries: Russia; Kazakhstan

Highway system
- International E-road network; A Class; B Class

European route E127 is a Class A north-south reference European route that connects Western Siberia with eastern Kazakhstan, spanning 1,382 kilometres (859 mi).

== Itinerary ==
The E127 routes through Russia and Kazakhstan:

Russia

- A 320: Omsk – Cherlak – border with Kazakhstan

Kazakhstan

- M 38: Karaman – Pavlodar – Semey – Georgiyevka
- Georgiyevka - Maykapshagay (at the border to China).

Maykapshagay (47.494°N 85.608°E) is the easternmost place reached by a European route, and is located about 150 km from the place that is farthest from the ocean.

== See also ==
- Asian Highway 60
