= Lake Zhalanashkol =

Lake in the country of Kazakhstan

Zhalanashkol
- Жалаңашкөл
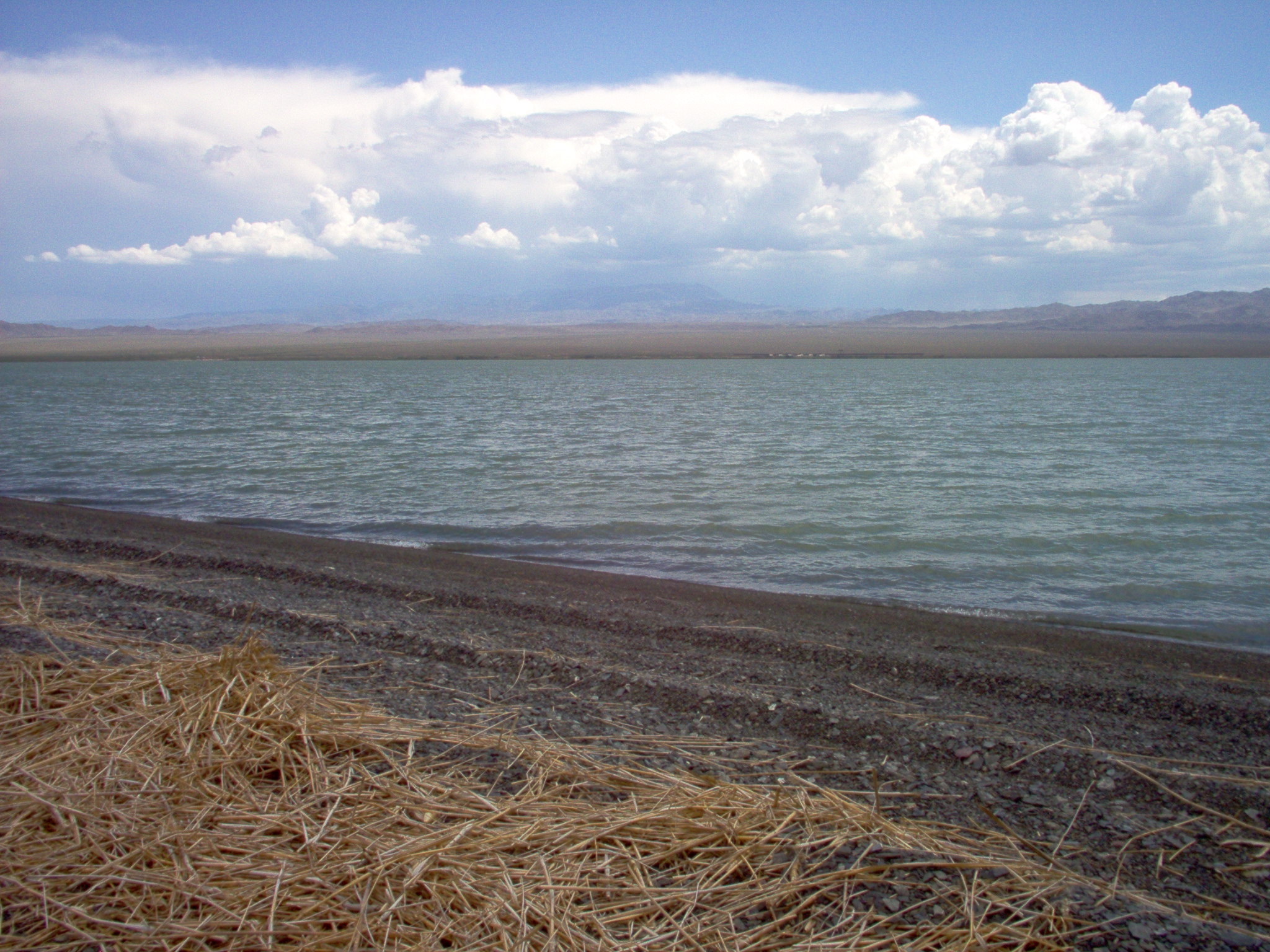

- Location within Kazakhstan
- Location: Balkhash-Alakol Basin
- Coordinates: 45°33′55.9″N 82°09′17.4″E
- Basin countries: Kazakhstan, China
- Max. length: 9 km (5.6 mi)
- Max. width: 5.6 km (3.5 mi)
- Surface area: 38 km^{2} (15 sq mi)
- Average depth: 3 m (9.8 ft)
- Max. depth: 5.5 m (18 ft)
- Surface elevation: 368 m (1,207 ft)

Lake Zhalanashkol (Kazakh: Жалаңашкөл, literally "Bare Lake", or "Exposed Lake"; Russian: Жаланашколь) is a freshwater lake in the eastern part of Kazakhstan, on the border of Almaty Province (Alakol District) and East Kazakhstan Province (Urzhar District). It is the smallest out of the four major lakes of the Alakol depression (the other three being the Alakol, Sasykkol, and Koshkarkol). It is also the southernmost of the four, the one closest to the Dzungarian Gate and the Aibi Lake on the other, Chinese, side of the Gate.

On the maps compiled in the 18th and 19th centuries, the Zhalanashkol is labeled Taskol (literally "Stone Lake"); this name is now obsolete.

== Description ==
On the border with the mountain ranges formed depression, in which there was an accumulation of wastewater flowing into rivers, creating isolated water bodies. In these desert areas with a dry continental climate and very little precipitation, water consumption in the drainless lakes occurred due to evaporation more intensively than the arrival of new water, which led to a gradual accumulation of salt minerals and other products, which caused the water in the lake to periodically become salty. Zhalanashkol has no permanent tributaries, the water regime is maintained by ground nutrition and a small amount of rain and snowmelt water. Fresh water with insignificant mineralization, sulphate-bicarbonate-sodium from 1.2 to 5 g/L. It is characterized by medicinal properties. The shores of the lake are flat and annually flooded, sometimes swampy with reeds. Along the wetlands there is a lot of salty clay with rotted lake vegetation, which is actively used for balneological purposes by the local population and tourists. The sloping banks are gravelly and pebbly, in the Eastern part of the coast is steep, in the southern-swampy, with a wide strip of submerged reeds.

In its geological past, the Zhalanashkol may have been the southernmost bay of the larger Lake Alakol. However, now the valley that connects the two lakes has been filled with sediment. Seasonally (when the water level in the Zhalanashkol is at its highest), water drains from the Zhalanashkol to the Alakol along the 10-km long slough called Zhaman-Otkel (Russian: Жаман-Откель).

No rivers reach the Zhalanashkol. (The Terekty River flows toward Zhalanashkol from the mountains of China's Yumin County, but reaches the lake only in the form of a usually dry alluvial fan.) The lake is fed by ground water, and by seasonal runoff of rainwater or snow meltwater from the surrounding area.

The lake is usually frozen until late March.

Lake Zhalanashkol is part of the Alakol Nature Reserve.

The Aktogay-Dostyk (Kazakhstan's connector between the Turkestan–Siberia Railway and China's Lanzhou–Xinjiang Railway) runs along the lake's eastern shore. The Zhalanashkol Railway Station is located there (45°36′00″N 82°11′00″E); a Kazakhstan border patrol station of the same name is nearby.

The highway to Dostyk runs on the lake's west side.

A Sino-Soviet border conflict, which took place in August 1969 in the hills east of the lake, has been known in the USSR and post-Soviet states as the "Lake Zhalanashkol incident". In China it is known as the Tielieketi incident, based on the name of a locality on the Chinese side on the border, itself coming from the Terekty River.
