= Zaisan, Kazakhstan =

Zaisan Зайсан
- Location within Kazakhstan
- Coordinates: 47°28′00″N 84°52′00″E
- Country: Kazakhstan
- Region: East Kazakhstan Region
- Founded: Established: 1868; 1941
- Elevation: 660 m (2,170 ft)

Population (2009)
  - Total: 14,389
- Time zone: UTC+06:00 (OMST)
  - Summer (DST): UTC+07:00 (OMSST)

Zaisan or Zaysan (Kazakh: Зайсан, Zaisan; Russian: Зайсан), is a town in the East Kazakhstan Region of Kazakhstan, the administrative center of Zaisan District. It is situated near the southeastern corner of Lake Zaysan at an altitude of 660 meters (2170 ft) above sea level. Population: 14,389 (2009 census results); 16,021 (1999 census results). The town is located near the eastern terminus of European route E127, which connects it with Omsk in Russia as well as the rest of the European route network.

== History ==
Zaisan was founded in 1868 as a Russian military post.

== Climate ==
Zaisan has a hot-summer humid continental climate (Köppen climate classification Dfa).

Climate data for Zaisan (1991–2020, extremes 1925–present)
Month	Jan	Feb	Mar	Apr	May	Jun	Jul	Aug	Sep	Oct	Nov	Dec	Year
Record high °C (°F)	8.6 (47.5)	10.8 (51.4)	24.3 (75.7)	33.0 (91.4)	35.8 (96.4)	39.1 (102.4)	42.0 (107.6)	41.1 (106.0)	37.8 (100.0)	32.8 (91.0)	17.4 (63.3)	13.9 (57.0)	42.0 (107.6)
Mean daily maximum °C (°F)	−12.6 (9.3)	−8.7 (16.3)	0.2 (32.4)	15.1 (59.2)	21.8 (71.2)	27.2 (81.0)	29.1 (84.4)	27.8 (82.0)	21.6 (70.9)	13.1 (55.6)	0.1 (32.2)	−9.0 (15.8)	10.5 (50.9)
Daily mean °C (°F)	−16.5 (2.3)	−13.4 (7.9)	−4.6 (23.7)	9.1 (48.4)	16.1 (61.0)	21.7 (71.1)	23.6 (74.5)	22.2 (72.0)	15.7 (60.3)	7.3 (45.1)	−4.3 (24.3)	−13.1 (8.4)	5.3 (41.5)
Mean daily minimum °C (°F)	−20.2 (−4.4)	−17.4 (0.7)	−8.7 (16.3)	3.9 (39.0)	10.8 (51.4)	16.8 (62.2)	18.8 (65.8)	17.4 (63.3)	10.7 (51.3)	2.8 (37.0)	−7.7 (18.1)	−16.7 (1.9)	0.9 (33.6)
Record low °C (°F)	−39.8 (−39.6)	−40.4 (−40.7)	−34.5 (−30.1)	−14.5 (5.9)	−3.4 (25.9)	0.8 (33.4)	8.1 (46.6)	2.9 (37.2)	−2.3 (27.9)	−17.8 (0.0)	−38.1 (−36.6)	−40.9 (−41.6)	−40.9 (−41.6)
Average precipitation mm (inches)	15.6 (0.61)	13.0 (0.51)	18.4 (0.72)	29.0 (1.14)	41.8 (1.65)	36.0 (1.42)	42.9 (1.69)	25.8 (1.02)	29.5 (1.16)	29.7 (1.17)	28.5 (1.12)	17.4 (0.69)	327.6 (12.90)
Average precipitation days (≥ 1.0 mm)	4.0	4.0	4.3	5.6	6.2	6.5	7.1	5.5	5.0	5.5	6.3	4.9	64.9
Mean monthly sunshine hours	138	163	202	242	282	304	327	311	254	182	129	116	2,650
Source 1: Pogoda.ru.net
Source 2: NOAA (sun, 1961–1990)
