= Semey Bridge =

- Coordinates: 50.4101°N 80.2248°E
- Carries: Six motorway lanes in each direction
- Crosses: Irtysh River
- Locale: Semey
- Official name: Semey Bridge
- Other name: Semipatalinsk Irtysh River Bridge

Characteristics
- Design: Suspension bridge
- Total length: 1,086 m (3,563 ft)
- Width: 35 m (115 ft)
- Height: 90.5+ m (297+ ft)
- Longest span: 750 m (2,460 ft)

History
- Designer: Katahira & Engineers IHI Corporation
- Construction start: 1998
- Construction cost: ¥29,964
- Opened: 17 October 2000

Location
- Interactive map of Semey Bridge

The Semey Bridge (Kazakh: Semeı qalasyndaǵy aspaly kópir) is a gravity-anchored suspension bridge that crosses the Irtysh River in Semey, Kazakhstan. It has a main span of 750 meters and a total length of 1086 m. It was built between 1998 and 2001 and is currently in use by road traffic. Local residents refer to the bridge as "New Bridge" in order to differentiate between this bridge and older one spanning Irtysh river.

== Background ==
The city of Semey, located in northeastern Kazakhstan, is the country’s fourth largest city as well as one of the important industrial cities in Kazakhstan’s northern region. It is a base for road transport and rail transport that connects Kazakhstan with central Russia. The city was developed along both sides of the Irtish River, a major river in Kazakhstan. One of Kazakhstan’s major trunk roads crosses the Irtish River in the city of Semey and leads to central Russia, traversing Omsk and Novosibirsk, as well as to the Chinese border. However, the only road bridge (hereinafter referred to as the “preexisting bridge”) in the city was the one built for the above-mentioned trunk line. It was a concrete bridge constructed in the city center in the 1960s; it was severely aged due to the extreme climate and inadequate operation and maintenance and was in danger of collapse. The traffic volume on the preexisting bridge at the time of the appraisal (1996) was 33,000 vehicles/day, and this figure was expected to increase. However, lane restrictions were applied, only 2 out of 4 lanes were used due to the above-mentioned age-worn condition of the bridge, hindering the smooth flow of traffic. Moreover, if the deterioration of the preexisting bridge had progressed further leading to closure of the bridge, the flow of city traffic have been completely blocked. There was a concern that closure would have posed a serious impediment to traffic over a wide geographical area, from central to northeastern Kazakhstan as well as central Russia. There was a time, when Semey was the capital of East Kazakhstan Region. Since May 1997, it has lost its status as being capital of the region. The project’s objective was to ensure the safe and smooth flow of traffic on a major trunk road by constructing a new bridge across the river and by constructing access roads in the city of Semey which contributed to the stimulation of the local economy.

== Cost ==
The total cost planned at the time of the appraisal was 28,321 million yen, and the actual project cost was 29,964 million yen (excluding the tunnel construction which was paid entirely by Kazakhstan), representing a 6% increase over the plan. Whereas the approved amount for Japanese ODA loan portion (equivalent to the foreign currency expenditure) was 21,530 million yen, the actual disbursed amount was 21,236 million yen, which was less than planned. Due to relocation of buried objects (such as water pipes) in association with the road construction and due to the additional construction, expenditure of local currency by Kazakhstan increased.

== Project period ==
The project lasted from March 1997 to October 2002. As for the bridge and approach road component, the opening of the new bridge, which was scheduled for October 2001, actually took place in October 2000. Furthermore, the completion of the project including the additional output and the tunnel construction by the government of Kazakhstan was completed by June 2004, which resulted in completion of consulting services.

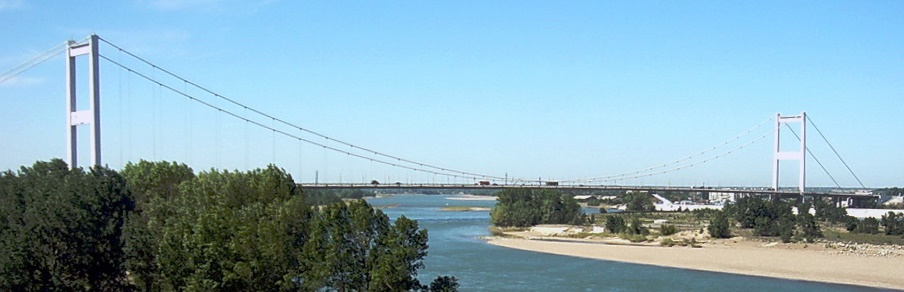
Semey Bridge

== Result of the completion ==
As a result of the completion of the new bridge, traffic volume on both banks of the Irtish River increased to an extent that greatly exceeded the assumptions at the time of appraisal. Moreover, traffic flow became smooth. There was some concern with regard to safety, but the project objective has been satisfactorily achieved overall, and so the effectiveness is judged to be high. However, after construction, the bridge hasn't been inspected for over periods of time which resulted in some concerns over the conditions of the bridge. Japanese experts have inspected the technical condition of the suspension bridge which concluded that the bridge is in a good condition, the only concern was about the paint coating due to some corrosion that needed to be removed. However, the local budget has no funds for the expensive repairs of the bridge. In Japan, the government spends 2-3 billion tenge ($13–20 million) annually to maintain one such bridge, whereas in Semey, the budget allocates only 3 million tenge ($20 thousand) annually.
