= Zaisan District =

Coordinates: 47°27′54″N 84°52′33″E

Zaisan
- District
- Зайсан ауданы
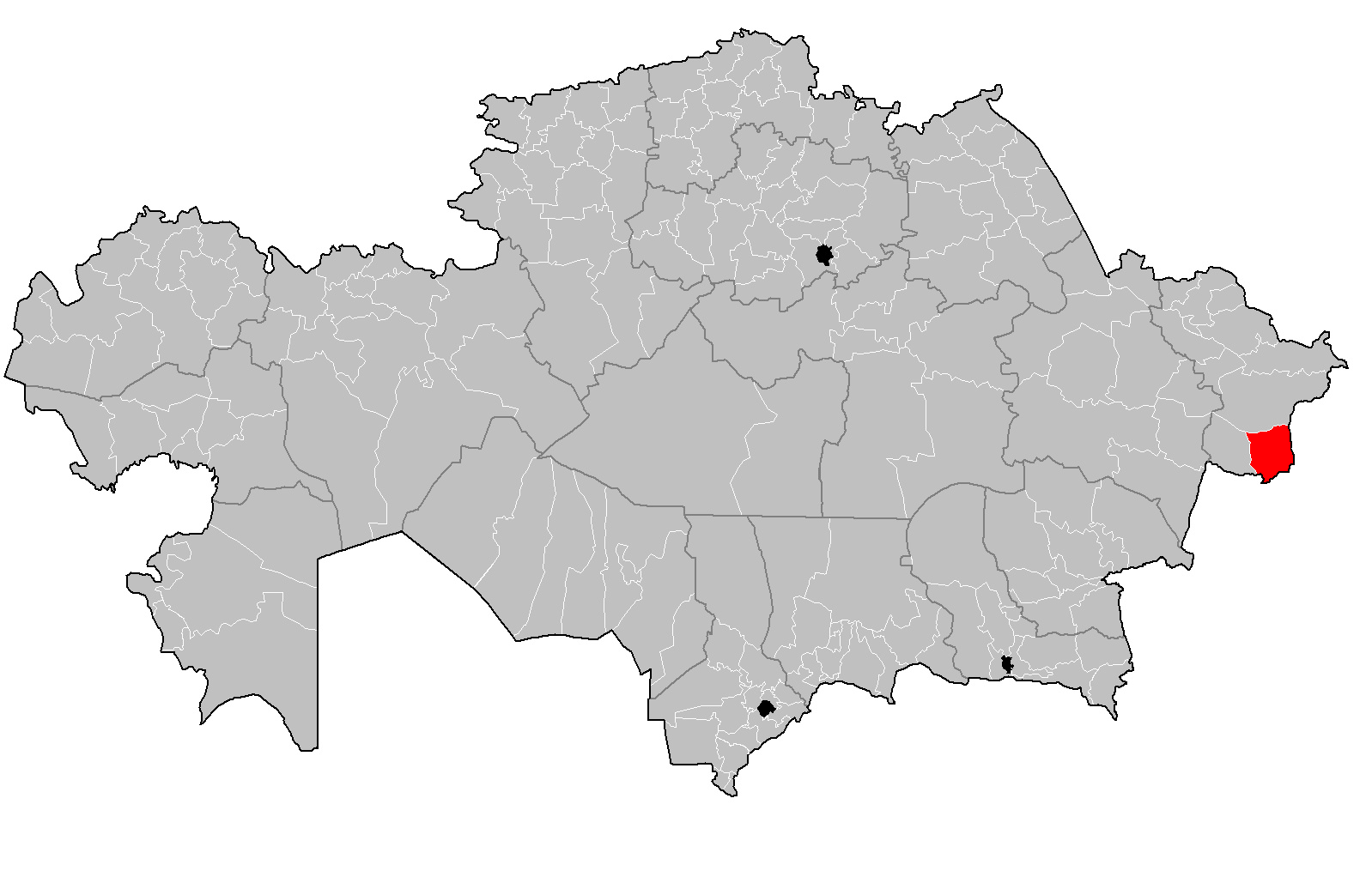
- Country: Kazakhstan
- Region: East Kazakhstan Region
- Administrative center: Zaisan

Government
  - Akim: Kazhanov Dulat Zaisanbekuly

Area
  - Total: 4,100 sq mi (10,500 km^{2})

Population (2013)
  - Total: 37,924
- Time zone: UTC+6 (East)

Zaisan (Kazakh: Зайсан ауданы, Zaisan audany) is a district of East Kazakhstan Region in eastern Kazakhstan. The administrative center of the district is the town of Zaisan. Population: 37,924 (2013 estimate); 34,593 (2009 census results); 39,556 (1999 census results).
