= Yumin County =

Yumin County 裕民县 (Chinese) چاغانتوقاي ناھىيىسى (Uyghur) شاعانتوعاي اۋدانى (Kazakh) Qagantokay
- County
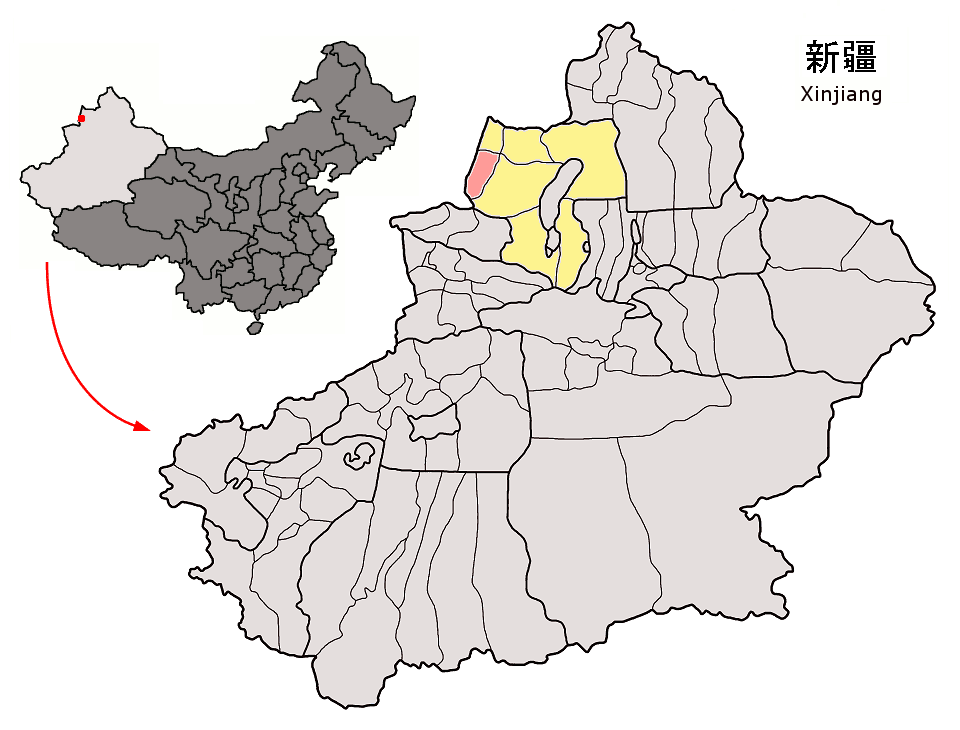
- Location of Yumin County (red) within Tacheng Prefecture (yellow) and Xinjiang

- Location of the seat in Xinjiang Yumin (Xinjiang) Yumin (China)
- Coordinates: 46°12′04″N 82°58′59″E
- Country: China
- Autonomous region: Xinjiang
- Prefecture: Tacheng
- County seat: Qarabura

Area
  - Total: 6,101.98 km^{2} (2,355.99 sq mi)

Population (2020)
  - Total: 50,819
  - Density: 8.3283/km^{2} (21.570/sq mi)
- Time zone: UTC+8 (China Standard (Note: Locals in Xinjiang frequently observe UTC+6 (Xinjiang Time), 2 hours behind Beijing.))
- Website: www.xjym.gov.cn

Yumin County

Chinese name
- Simplified Chinese: 裕民县
- Traditional Chinese: 裕民縣
Transcriptions
Standard Mandarin
- Hanyu Pinyin: Yùmín Xiàn

Alternative Chinese name
- Simplified Chinese: 察罕托海县
- Traditional Chinese: 察罕託海縣
Transcriptions
Standard Mandarin
- Hanyu Pinyin: Cháhǎntuōhǎi Xiàn

Uyghur name
- Uyghur: چاغانتوقاي ناھىيىسى
Transcriptions
- Latin Yëziqi: Chaghantoqay Nahiyisi
- Yengi Yeziⱪ: Qaƣantoⱪay Naⱨiyisi
- SASM/GNC: Qagantokay Nahiyisi
- Siril Yëziqi: Чағантоқай Наһийиси

Kazakh name
- Kazakh: شاعانتوعاي اۋدانى; Шағантоғай ауданы Şağantoğai audany

Yumin County, also known as Qagantokay County, is a county of Tacheng Prefecture in the Xinjiang Uyghur Autonomous Region of China, bordering Kazakhstan's regions of East Kazakhstan and Almaty. It has an area of 6,090 km^{2} (2,350 sq mi) with a population of 50,000. The Postcode is 834800.

== History ==
During the 1962 Yi–Ta incident, which saw the exodus of 58,000 people from Tacheng Prefecture, 60 per cent of Yumin County's population left for the Soviet Union.

== Demographics ==
The proportion of nationalities in Yumin (Chaghantoqay) County
Nationality	Percentage
Han People	57.6%
Kazakhs	32.5%
Hui People	6.9%
Russian	0.4%
Uyghurs	0.3%
Mongols	0.2%
Xibe people	0.1%
Daur people	0.1%
Others	1.9%
Source of the population statistics :

== Administrative divisions ==
Yumin County is divided into 2 towns, 4 townships.

Name	Simplified Chinese	Hanyu Pinyin	Uyghur (UEY)	Uyghur Latin (ULY)	Kazakh (Arabic script)	Kazakh (Cyrillic script)	Administrative division code
Towns
Qarabura Town	哈拉布拉镇	Hālābùlā Zhèn	قارابۇرا بازىرى	qarabura baziri	قارابۋرا قالاشىعى	Қарабура қалашығы	654225100
Jiyek Town	吉也克镇	Jíyěkè Zhèn	جىيەك بازىرى	jiyek baziri	جيەك قالاشىعى	Жиек қалашығы	654225101
Townships
Qarabura Township	哈拉布拉乡	Hālābùlā Xiāng	قارابۇرا يېزىسى	qarabura yëzisi	قارابۋرا اۋىلى	Қарабура ауылы	654225200
Yëngiyer Township	新地乡	Xīndì Xiāng	يېڭىيەر يېزىسى	yëngiyer yëzisi	جاڭا جەر اۋىلى	Жаңа Жер ауылы	654225201
Altun'ëmil Township	阿勒腾也木勒乡	Ālèténgyěmùlè Xiāng	ئالتۇنئېمىل يېزىسى	Altun'ëmil yëzisi	التىنەمىل اۋىلى	Алтынеміл ауылы	654225202
Jëngis Township	江格斯乡	Jiānggésī Xiāng	جېڭىس يېزىسى	jëngis yëzisi	جاڭگىس اۋىلى	Жәңгіс ауылы	654225203

Other:

- Chaghantoqay Ranch (察汗托海牧场, چاغانتوقاي چارۋىچىلىق مەيدانى, شاعانتوعاي مال شارۋاشىلىعى الاڭىنداعى)
- XPCC 161st Regiment (兵团农九师一六一团, 161-تۇەن مەيدانى, 161-تۋان الاڭىنداعى)

== Climate ==
Climate data for Yumin, elevation 721 m (2,365 ft), (1991–2020 normals, extremes 1981–2010)
Month	Jan	Feb	Mar	Apr	May	Jun	Jul	Aug	Sep	Oct	Nov	Dec	Year
Record high °C (°F)	12.4 (54.3)	12.0 (53.6)	25.9 (78.6)	33.5 (92.3)	36.4 (97.5)	37.1 (98.8)	40.5 (104.9)	40.3 (104.5)	38.4 (101.1)	30.0 (86.0)	18.6 (65.5)	13.1 (55.6)	40.5 (104.9)
Mean daily maximum °C (°F)	−3.5 (25.7)	−1.1 (30.0)	6.2 (43.2)	17.3 (63.1)	23.1 (73.6)	28.2 (82.8)	30.4 (86.7)	29.4 (84.9)	23.6 (74.5)	15.0 (59.0)	4.7 (40.5)	−1.9 (28.6)	14.3 (57.7)
Daily mean °C (°F)	−9.7 (14.5)	−7.1 (19.2)	0.3 (32.5)	10.6 (51.1)	16.5 (61.7)	21.7 (71.1)	23.7 (74.7)	22.3 (72.1)	16.3 (61.3)	8.0 (46.4)	−0.8 (30.6)	−7.5 (18.5)	7.9 (46.1)
Mean daily minimum °C (°F)	−14.2 (6.4)	−11.7 (10.9)	−4.3 (24.3)	5.0 (41.0)	10.4 (50.7)	15.5 (59.9)	17.5 (63.5)	15.9 (60.6)	10.0 (50.0)	2.9 (37.2)	−4.7 (23.5)	−11.5 (11.3)	2.6 (36.6)
Record low °C (°F)	−29.3 (−20.7)	−31.2 (−24.2)	−25.0 (−13.0)	−11.7 (10.9)	−4.2 (24.4)	4.1 (39.4)	7.3 (45.1)	4.5 (40.1)	−2.7 (27.1)	−12.8 (9.0)	−31.4 (−24.5)	−30.5 (−22.9)	−31.4 (−24.5)
Average precipitation mm (inches)	22.3 (0.88)	17.4 (0.69)	22.0 (0.87)	31.6 (1.24)	30.3 (1.19)	25.1 (0.99)	26.1 (1.03)	24.5 (0.96)	21.2 (0.83)	27.6 (1.09)	39.5 (1.56)	27.9 (1.10)	315.5 (12.43)
Average precipitation days (≥ 0.1 mm)	0.8	0.2	0.2	0.5	1.4	3.0	4.0	2.6	1.1	0.4	0.3	0.5	15
Average snowy days	2.2	0.6	0.8	0.3	0.1	0	0	0	0	0.1	0.9	1.9	6.9
Average relative humidity (%)	70	70	66	51	45	44	44	42	45	59	72	72	57
Mean monthly sunshine hours	205.2	224.3	279.8	300.3	342.6	329.8	320.3	323.5	300.8	277.4	214.4	190.5	3,308.9
Percentage possible sunshine	70	74	75	74	75	72	70	76	82	83	75	69	75
Source: China Meteorological Administration
