= April 1930 =

Month of 1930

<<	April 1930					>>
Su	Mo	Tu	We	Th	Fr	Sa
		1	2	3	4	5
6	7	8	9	10	11	12
13	14	15	16	17	18	19
20	21	22	23	24	25	26
27	28	29	30

The following events occurred in April 1930:

== Tuesday, April 1, 1930 ==
- The new German chancellor Heinrich Brüning openly threatened the Reichstag with dissolution if it failed to carry out his policies. "The cabinet has been formed for the purpose of solving problems of vital importance to the country in the shortest possible time", he told the parliament. "This is our last effort to solve these problems with the present Reichstag."
- The film The Blue Angel starring Emil Jannings and Marlene Dietrich premiered at Ufa-Palast in Berlin.
- Born: Grace Lee Whitney, actress and entertainer, in Ann Arbor, Michigan (d. 2015)
- Died:
  - Cosima Wagner, 92, daughter of Hungarian composer Franz Liszt, wife of German composer Richard Wagner and co-founder of the Bayreuth Festival
  - An Chang-nam, 29, first Korean aviator, when his plane crashed in bad weather

== Wednesday, April 2, 1930 ==
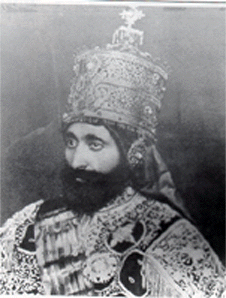
Emperor Haile Selassie

- Ras Tafari Makonnen Woldemikael, more popularly known as Haile Selassie, became the new Emperor of Ethiopia upon the death of Empress Zewditu. He would reign for 44 years before being deposed in a military coup in 1974.
- Almost 100 passengers and crew on the Japanese ferry ship Wakato Maru died when the vessel capsized in a gale off Kyushu. The small ferry was overcrowded beyond its normal capacity.

== Thursday, April 3, 1930 ==
- The second Academy Awards were held, in the Ambassador Hotel in Los Angeles. Unlike in the inaugural year, the winners were not announced in advance. For the first time, the ceremony broadcast live on the radio, hosted by Los Angeles station KNX. The Broadway Melody won the award for Outstanding Picture.
- The Montreal Canadiens hockey team won their third Stanley Cup, defeating the Boston Bruins 4–3 to win the Finals two games to none.
- Born:
  - Helmut Kohl, the last Chancellor of West Germany (from 1982 to 1990) and the first Chancellor of Germany after its 1990 unification, serving until 1998; in Ludwigshafen (d. 2017)
  - Lawton Chiles, U.S. Senator for Florida from 1971 to 1989, then Governor of Florida from 1991 until his death; in Lakeland, Florida (d. 1998);
- Died: Dame Emma Albani, 82, Canadian operatic soprano (b. 1847)

== Friday, April 4, 1930 ==
- Former U.S. Secretary of State Frank B. Kellogg told a luncheon audience in Chicago that American isolationism was no longer viable. "A great nation like ours, with ten billions a year of foreign commerce, has as much to gain by the establishment of the World Court as any country in the world", he said.
- The American Interplanetary Society was founded to conduct rocket experiments. In 1934 the organization changed its name to the American Rocket Society.

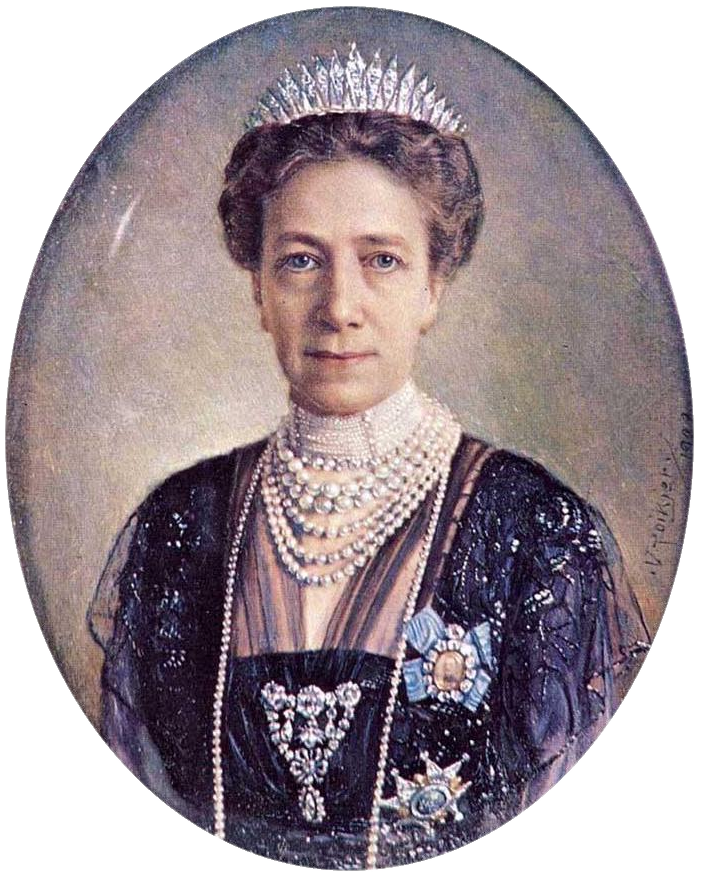
Victoria of Sweden

- Died: Victoria of Baden, 67, Queen Consort of Sweden since 1907, as the wife of King Gustaf V

== Saturday, April 5, 1930 ==
- In Belgium, a new law made Dutch the only official language of the University of Ghent, against the wishes of the French speaking minority in Flanders, the predominantly Flemish-speaking section of northern Belgium.

== Sunday, April 6, 1930 ==
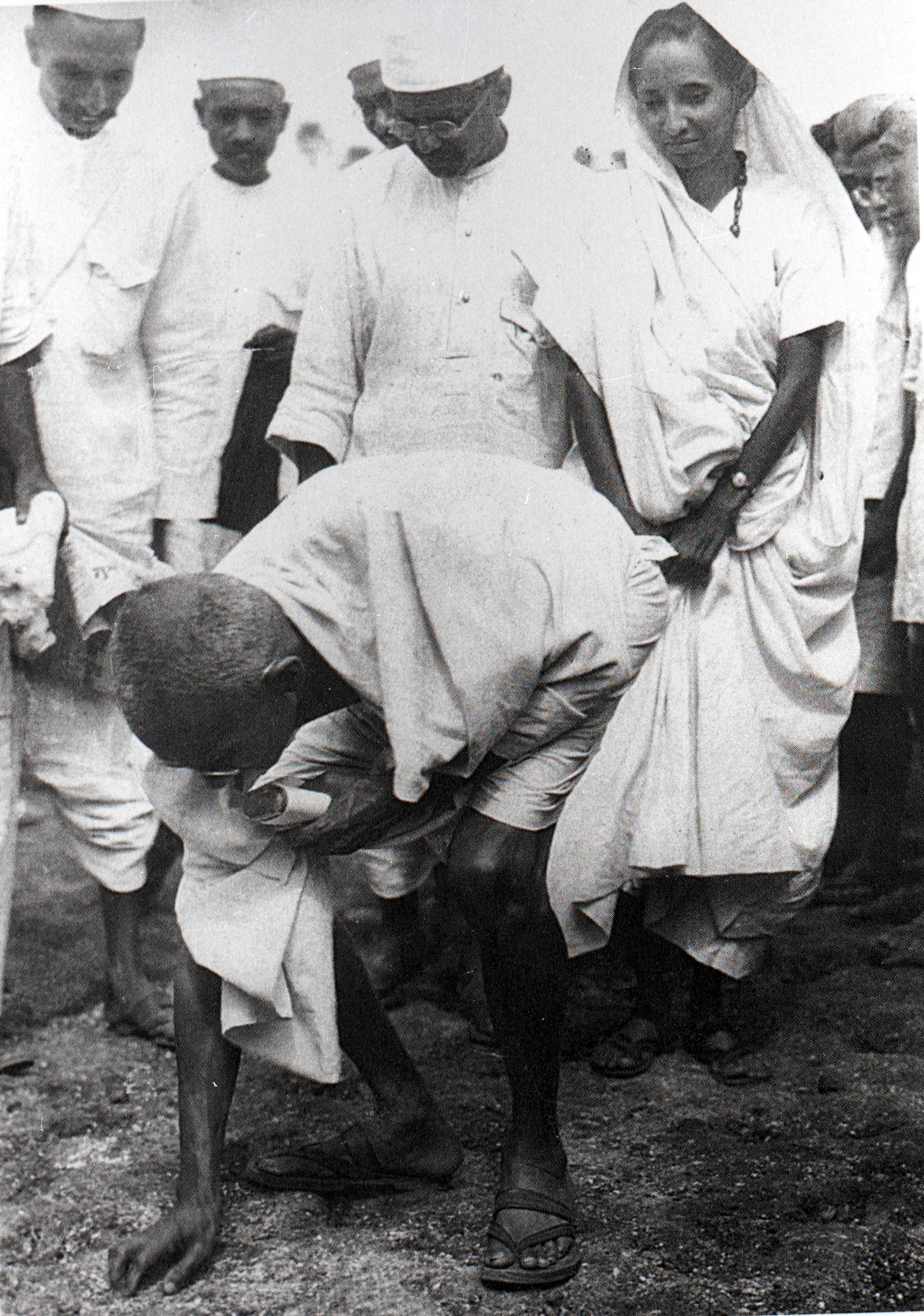
Gandhi at the end of the March

- Mahatma Gandhi ended the Salt March, part of the Civil Disobedience Movement at Dandi, Navsari. Here Gandhi broke the law by picking up a few grains of salt from the beach.

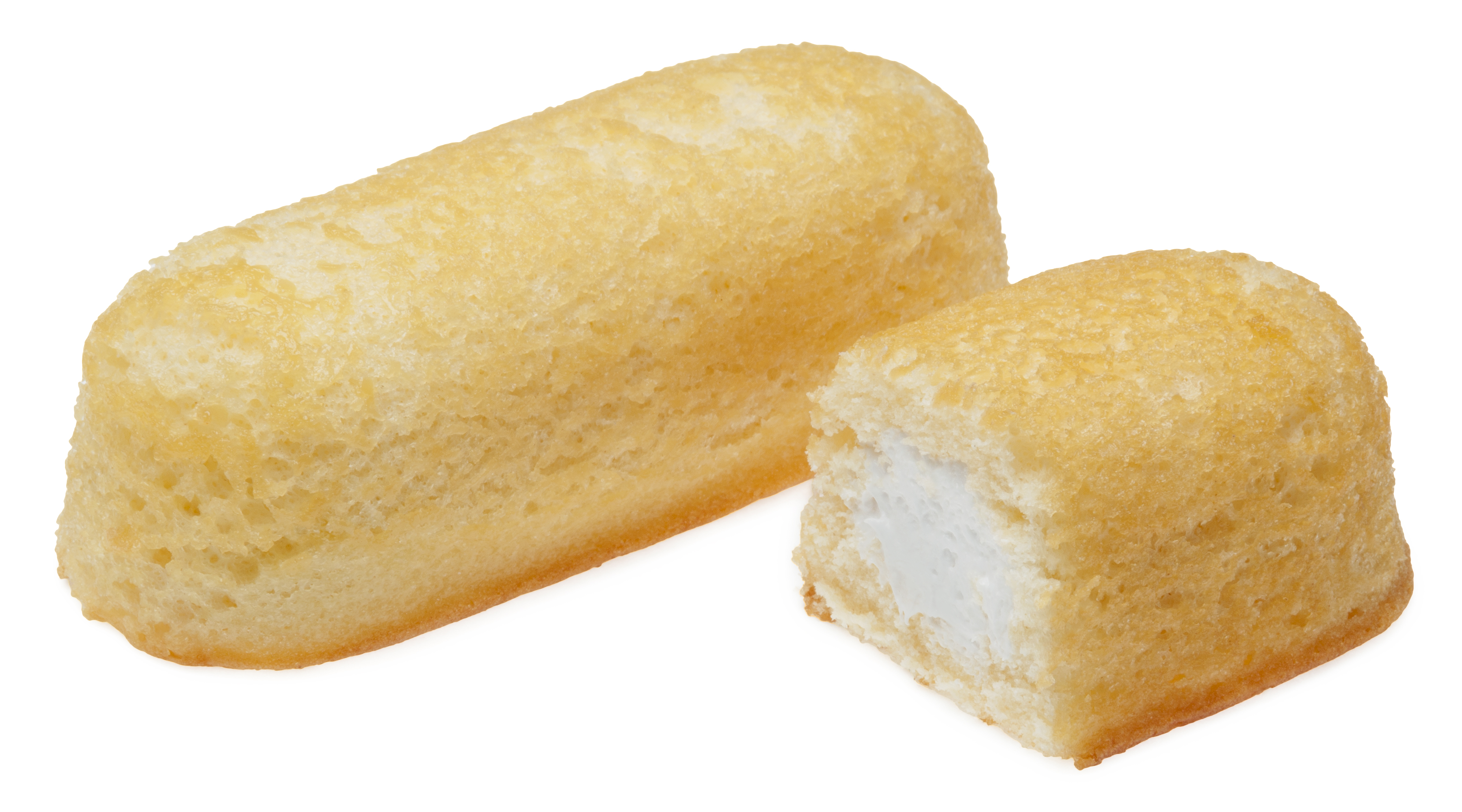
A Twinkie

- The Twinkie, a popular snack consisting of a (then banana) cream-filled sponge cake, was created at the Continental Baking Company in the Chicago suburb of River Forest, Illinois.
- René Dreyfus won the second Monaco Grand Prix.
- The Order of the Red Star medal was established in the Soviet Union.

== Monday, April 7, 1930 ==
- The government of the Soviet Union decided to establish a ministry of physical culture.
- Born: Andrew Sachs, German-born British actor, in Berlin (d. 2016)
- Died: William P. G. Harding, 65, American banker

== Tuesday, April 8, 1930 ==
- The war film Journey's End premiered at the Gaiety Theatre in New York City.
- Born: Carlos Hugo, Duke of Parma, in Paris, France (d. 2010)

== Wednesday, April 9, 1930 ==
- The Brunswick-Balke-Collender Company sold Brunswick Records to Warner Bros.
- Died: Rose Caron, 72, French operatic soprano

== Thursday, April 10, 1930 ==
- Police raided the Indian National Congress headquarters in Bombay and made two arrests.
- Born: Spede Pasanen, Finnish filmmaker, inventor and television personality, in Kuopio (d. 2001)

== Friday, April 11, 1930 ==
- The Tokyo Stock Exchange was suspended early for the day due to a selling panic.
- Rioting was reported from Taranto, Italy due to economic conditions.
- American scientists predicted that man would land on the Moon by 2050.

== Saturday, April 12, 1930 ==
- Germany and Austria signed a trade agreement.
- The University of Cambridge won the 82nd Boat Race. Cambridge now had an all-time record of 41–40 against Oxford, leading for the first time since 1863.
- Born: John Landy, Australian athlete and politician (d. 2022)

== Sunday, April 13, 1930 ==
- Inspired by Gandhi's Salt March, 500,000 people in British India held an orderly demonstration in Bombay, defying the colonial law against private gathering of salt and throwing a monstrous effigy, representing the salt tax, into the Indian Ocean.

== Monday, April 14, 1930 ==
- Indian independence leader Jawaharlal Nehru was arrested and charged with violating the salt law.
- On budget day in the United Kingdom, Chancellor of the Exchequer Philip Snowden presented tax increases on income, death duties and beer.
- The Reichstag approved Chancellor Brüning's series of economic bills which included farm relief and an increase in the tax on beer.

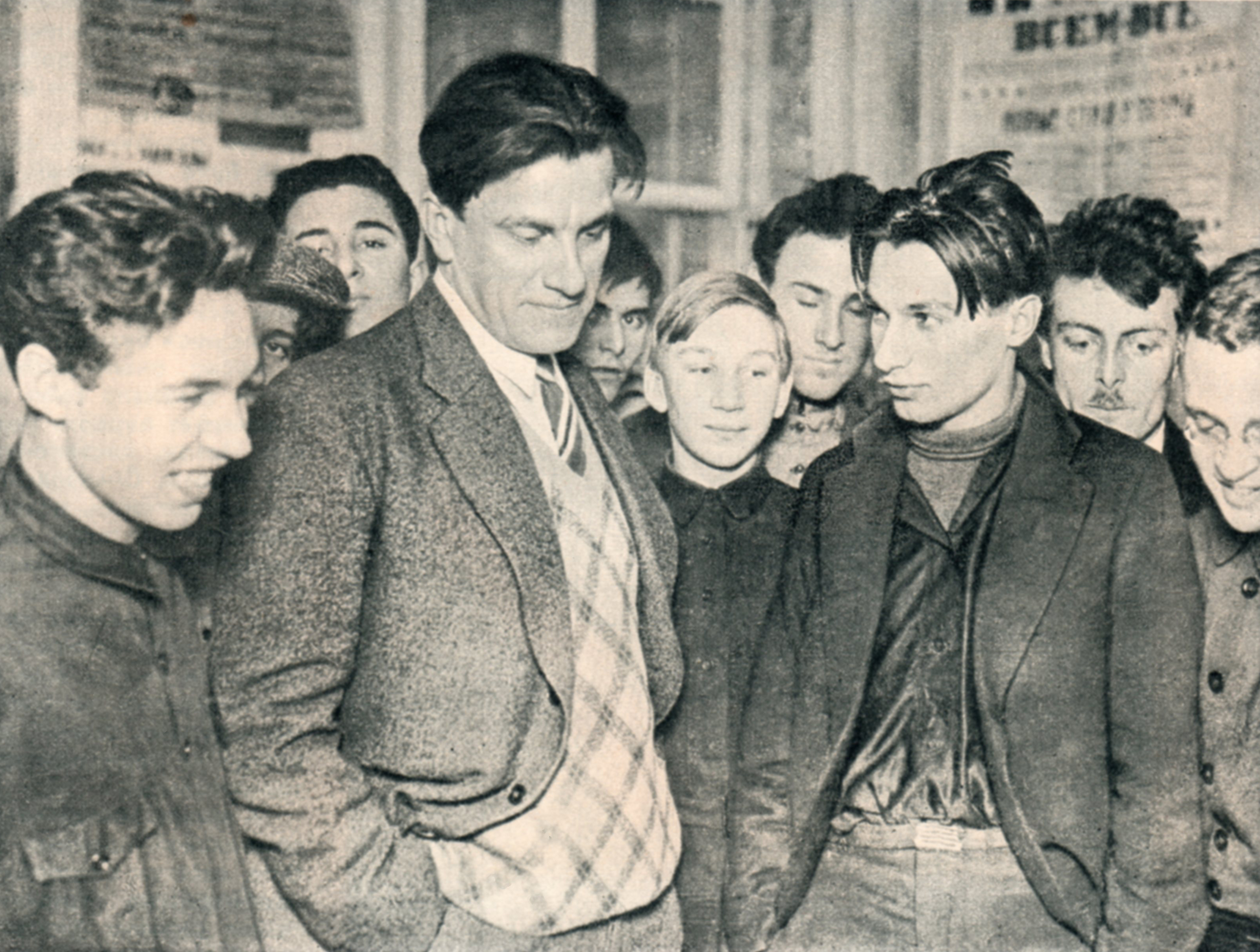
Mayakovsky, two months before his suicide

- Died:
  - Vladimir Mayakovsky, 36, Russian playwright, poet and actor, shot himself in the heart after a concerted campaign against him by the Soviet press.
  - John B. Sheridan, 60, Irish-born American sportswriter

== Tuesday, April 15, 1930 ==
- Riots broke out in Calcutta over the imprisonment of Nehru and the city's mayor.
- Born: Vigdís Finnbogadóttir, President of Iceland from 1980 to 1996 and the first woman to be voted as any nation's president in a democratic election; in Reykjavík

== Wednesday, April 16, 1930 ==
- Britain and the Soviet Union signed a new trade pact granting each other most favoured nation status.

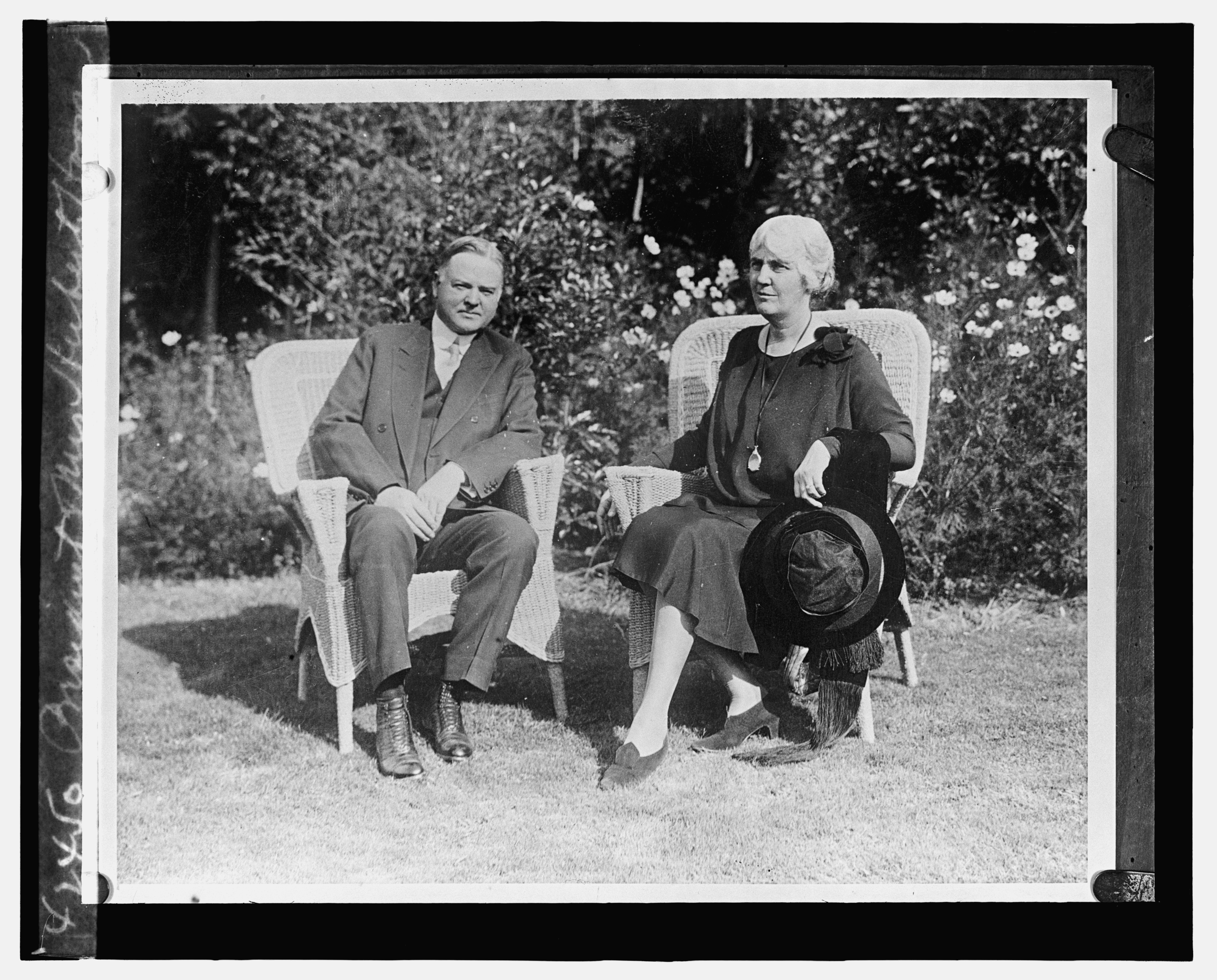
The President and Mrs. Hoover

- First Lady Lou Henry Hoover suffered a back injury in a fall at the White House. The injury was serious enough to require her to use a wheelchair during her recovery.
- Wilhelm Frick of the Nazi Party, the Interior Minister of the German state of Thuringia, introduced nationalistic new prayers to be recited in elementary schools. Liberals objected to the propagandistic content of the prayers and challenged their constitutionality in court. One line read, "I believe that thou wilt punish the betrayal of Germany and bless the actions of those who seek to free the Fatherland."
- Born: Herbie Mann, jazz flautist, in Pecos, New Mexico (d. 2003)

== Thursday, April 17, 1930 ==
- Twenty-seven Indian independence demonstrators were sentenced for breaking the salt laws, including Mahatma Gandhi's son Devdas, who received three months imprisonment. Mahatma Gandhi urged his followers to continue nonviolent forms of protest, saying that riots like the one in Calcutta "will harm our struggle."
- The Paraguayan soccer football club Club Sportivo San Lorenzo was founded.

== Friday, April 18, 1930 ==
- The BBC Radio news bulletin from London stated: "Good evening. Today is Good Friday. There is no news." Piano music followed for roughly 15 minutes.
- A typhoon swept through Leyte in the Philippines, causing extensive damage.
- The Chittagong armoury raid occurred when Indian revolutionaries led by Surya Sen raided an armoury in the Bengal province of British India, seizing it and setting it on fire. Martial law was proclaimed and troops were called out to quell the uprising.
- A fire killed 118 people at a wooden church in the small Romanian town of Costești, most of them schoolchildren, after starting during Good Friday services. Candles being used in the service brushed against drapery and set it ablaze.

== Saturday, April 19, 1930 ==
- Three people were killed and 36 injured in fighting between police and protestors in Warsaw, Poland when 2,000 unemployed textile workers surrounded city hall and threw stones at the building while demanding assistance.

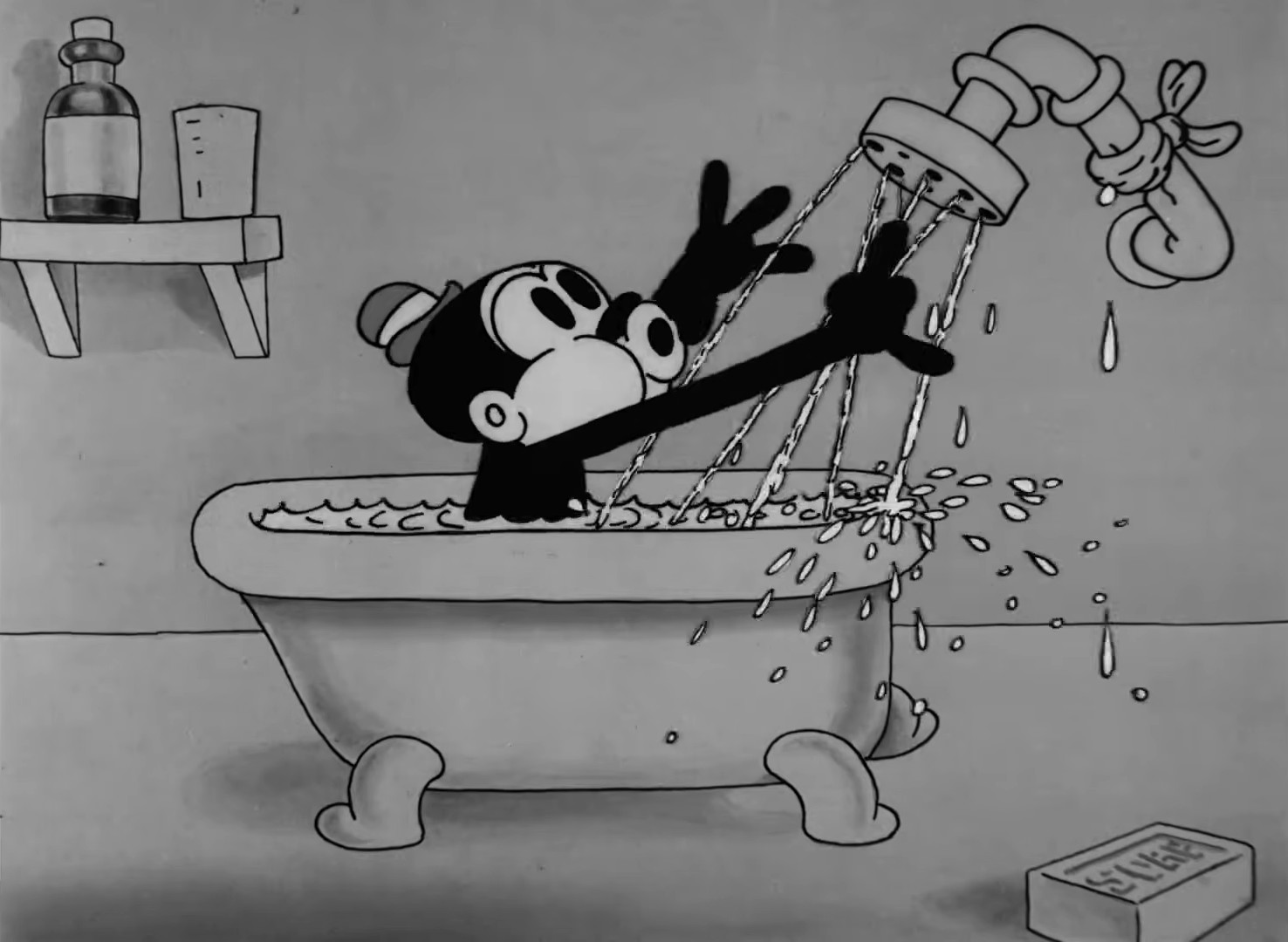
The forgotten first Looney Tunes character, "Bosko"

- The very first Warner Bros. cartoon short, Sinkin' in the Bathtub, was released. It was the first in the Looney Tunes series and introduced the character of Bosko.
- Clarence DeMar won his seventh Boston Marathon.
- The drama film The Divorcee starring Norma Shearer was released.
- Born: Dick Sargent, American television actor known primarily as the replacement of Dick York on the comedy Bewitched; in Carmel-by-the-Sea, California (d. 1994)

== Sunday, April 20, 1930 ==
- Charles Lindbergh, accompanied by his wife Anne, flew a Lockheed Model 8 Sirius from Los Angeles to New York in 14 hours, 45 minutes and 32 seconds, a new transcontinental record.
- Mary Russell, Duchess of Bedford, and her personal pilot C. D. Barnard completed a record-breaking flight of 9,000 miles in a Fokker F.VII, made from Lympne Airport in the UK to Cape Town, South Africa, in 100 flying hours over 10 days.

== Monday, April 21, 1930 ==
- Construction of the Turkestan–Siberia Railway was completed. The Railway opened a week later, on April 28.

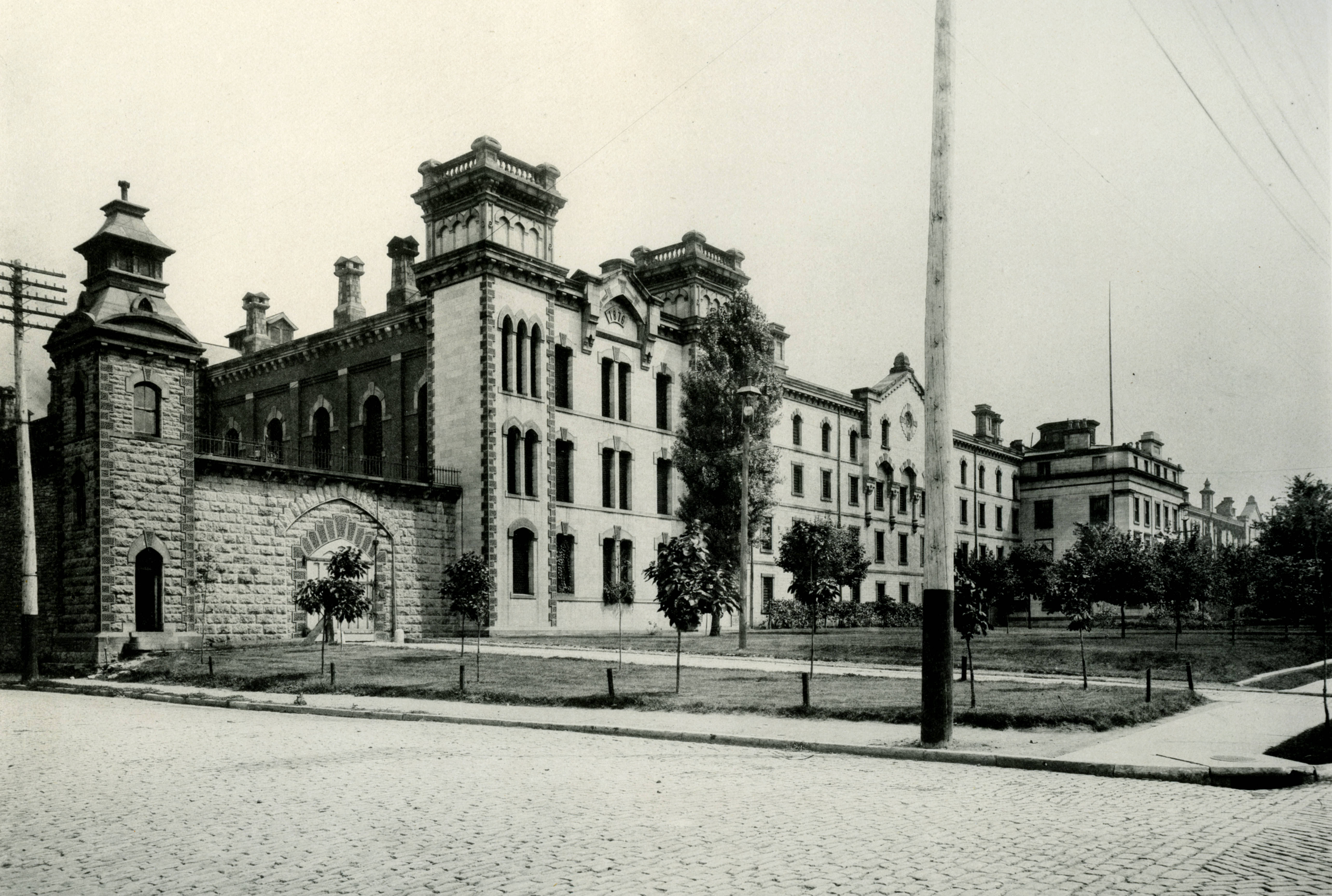
The Ohio Penitentiary

- In what is still the worst prison fire in U.S. history, 320 inmates were killed at the Ohio Penitentiary in Columbus.
- The war film All Quiet on the Western Front premiered at the Carthay Circle Theatre in Los Angeles.
- In the U.S., the Presbyterian General Assembly publicized the findings of a commission appointed to investigate marriage and divorce in America. One section of the study blamed rising divorce rates on cultural tendencies such as jazz due to its "primeval jungle tom tom" which "inspires contortions of dance unfitting to incipient rheumatics", as well as stage plays and films in which adultery was "the fashionable theme".
- Born: Silvana Mangano, Italian actress, in Rome (d. 1989)
- Died: Robert Bridges, 85, English poet

== Tuesday, April 22, 1930 ==
- The London Naval Treaty was signed by representatives of the United Kingdom, Japan, France, Italy and the United States, limiting the tonnage of warships until 1936. France and Italy were exempted from the section that set limitations on total tonnage, but it was hoped that they would sign on to the full treaty at a later date.
- Sixty-four British and Indian troops were killed in a battle to capture a group of revolutionaries who had participated in the Chittagong raid, while only 11 of the rebels died. The fight began after a group of 57 outlaws were surrounded at the Jalalabad mountain range by British Indian forces.
- Died: Jeppe Aakjær, 63, Danish poet and novelist

== Wednesday, April 23, 1930 ==
- The Chicago Crime Commission labeled 28 gangsters as "public enemies", popularizing the use of that term in the general lexicon. Chicago north side mob leader Al Capone was identified as "Public Enemy Number 1". Other names on the list included Terry Druggan, Jack McGurn, Bugs Moran, Joseph Saltis and Jack Zuta.

== Thursday, April 24, 1930 ==
- Edda Mussolini and Count Galeazzo Ciano were married at the Church of San Giuseppe in Rome, Italy.
- Born:
  - Richard Donner, American film director, in New York City (d. 2021)
  - José Sarney, 31st President of Brazil, in Pinheiro, Maranhão
- Died: Adele Ritchie, 55, American comic opera singer, of a self-inflicted gunshot wound, after fatally shooting set designer Doris Miller.

== Friday, April 25, 1930 ==
- In the United States, Ralph Capone was found guilty on four counts of tax fraud.
- Born: Paul Mazursky, U.S. film director, screenwriter and actor, in Brooklyn (d. 2014)

== Saturday, April 26, 1930 ==
- Vithalbhai Patel resigned as President of the Central Legislative Assembly of India in sympathy with the independence movement.
- Arsenal defeated Huddersfield Town, 2 to 0, to win English soccer football's FA Cup, in a match at Wembley Stadium.

== Sunday, April 27, 1930 ==
- For the first time in history, an international radiotelephone call was made from a speeding train. Canadian National Railway President Sir Henry Worth Thornton phoned the U.S. commerce secretary Robert P. Lamont in Washington, then his Canadian counterpart James Malcolm, and finally made a call to the vice president of the company in London during the inauguration of a new train service from Montreal to Chicago.
- Nine spectators were killed and 20 injured at an air show in the U.S. at Fayetteville, Tennessee, after a plane crashed onto a railroad embankment and veered into the crowd. The pilot, Milton P. Covert, survived.

== Monday, April 28, 1930 ==
- The Turkestan–Siberia Railway opened, connecting the cities of Arys and Novosibirsk. Construction of the remainder of the line would continue nine more months until January. When finished, the four-year project had cost over 161 million rubles.
- The Independence, Kansas, baseball team of the Class C Western Association hosted the first regular season night game in organized baseball history. The visiting Muskogee Chiefs beat the Independence Producers under the lights by a score of 13–3 before a crowd of 1,000.
- A solar eclipse occurred on this day, with the path of totality passing through the northwestern United States and across central and eastern Canada.
- Born: James Baker, U.S. Secretary of State, 1989 to 1992; former U.S. Secretary of the Treasury and White House Chief of Staff; in Houston, Texas.
- Died: Charles Grandmougin, 80, French poet and playwright

== Tuesday, April 29, 1930 ==
- Film producer and executive David O. Selznick married socialite Irene Mayer (daughter of film producer Louis B. Mayer) in a simple ceremony at Mayer's house in Hollywood, United States.
- Born: Jean Rochefort, French actor; in Paris (d. 2017)

== Wednesday, April 30, 1930 ==
- Italy decreed that its naval construction program for the next year would consist of 29 new ships totalling 42,900 tons, an increase of 12,000 tons over the previous year.
- The Dutch football club Ter Leede was founded.
