= Turkestan–Siberia Railway =

Railway line in Russia, Kazakhstan, and Kyrgyzstan

Coordinates: 44°37′24″N 77°59′32″E

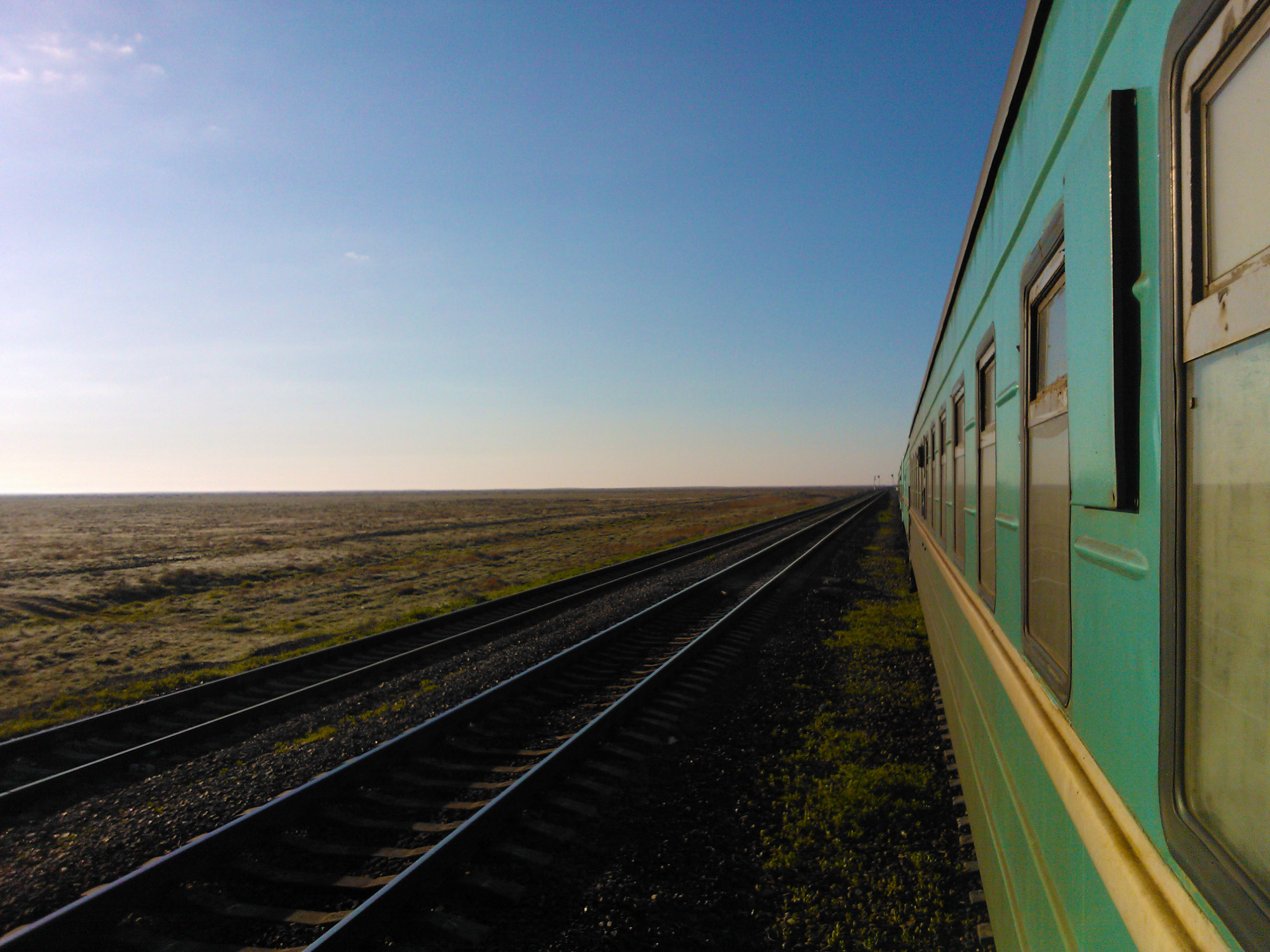
- Turkestan–Siberia railway in the southern steppe of Kazakhstan.

Overview
- Other name: Turk–Sib
- Status: Operational
- Owner: Russian Railways (Novosibirsk–Lokot); Kazakhstan Temir Joly (Zhana-Semei–Arys I)
- Locale: Central Asia
- Termini: Novosibirsk; Arys I
- Stations: 22

Service
- Type: Inter-city rail; Freight rail
- Operators: Kazakhstan Temir Joly; Russian Railways; Uzbek Railways

History
- Work began: 1927–1930
- Opened: 21 April 1930
- Completed: 21 April 1930

Technical
- Line length: 2,375 km (1,476 mi)
- Number of tracks: 2
- Character: International rail link
- Track gauge: 1,520 mm (4 ft 11 27/32 in)
- Electrification: 25 kV 50 Hz AC overhead line

The Turkestan–Siberian Railway (commonly abbreviated as the Turk–Sib, Kazakh: Түрксіб, romanized: Türksib, pronounced [tʉrksɪ́p]; Russian: Турксиб) is a 1,520 mm (4 ft 11 27/32 in) broad gauge railway that connects Central Asia with Siberia. It starts north of Tashkent in Uzbekistan at Arys, where it branches off from the Trans-Aral Railway. It heads roughly northeast through Shymkent, Taraz, Bishkek (on a spur) to the former Kazakh capital of Almaty. There it turns northward to Semey before crossing the Russian border. It passes through Barnaul before ending at Novosibirsk, where it meets the West Siberian portion of the Trans-Siberian Railway. The bulk of construction work was undertaken between 1926 and 1931.

== Construction history ==
The Turkestan-Siberia route

Turksib chief Vladimir Shatov driving the last spike at the Turksib opening ceremony, Aynabulaq, 29 April 1930

The idea of a railway between Siberia and Russian Turkestan was aired as early as 1886, but it was supplanted by that of a more practicable line between Tashkent and Orenburg in the Urals. On 15 October 1896 the Verny town duma set up a commission to examine the feasibility of building a Turkestan–Siberia Railway. It was expected that the line would facilitate the transport of cotton from Turkestan to Siberia and cheap Siberian grain from Russia to the Fergana Valley. An eastern branch would enhance Russia's military and economic presence on the Chinese border.

In 1906 the Russian imperial government decided to finance the construction of the first section, between Barnaul and Arys. A team of Russian engineers made a detailed survey of the steppe and semi-desert regions the railway was expected to cross. On 21 October 1915 the northern section linking Novosibirsk and Semipalatinsk as the Altai Railway. The missing Arys–Pishpek–Tokmak section, officially known as Semipalatinsk Railway, was left to be built by a French-financed Russian-managed private railway consortium. World War I put an end to this project.

After the Bolshevik Revolution construction work was suspended for a decade, and the 140-kilometre (87 mi) long Semipalatinsk–Ayaguz line, built-in 1918–19 by the White Russians on the initiative of Admiral Kolchak, was demolished for no apparent reason. The remaining 1,442 kilometres (896 mi) railway were constructed with great fanfare as part of the first five-year plan between 1928 and 1932.

Regular passenger service was finally established between Semipalatinsk and Ayaguz on 10 May 1929. The Turksib was completed on 21 April 1930. The locomotive which pioneered the route going from Tashkent to Semipalatinsk (Э-1441(rus)) later became a part of a memorial in Alma-Ata.

Viktor Turin directed a 1929 Soviet documentary film on the building of the railway which also bore the name Turksib.

== Connectivity ==
Video of Turksib railway in the southern Kazakhstan steppe

Years after the Turksib was completed, it was joined at Shu by Kazakhstan's main north-south line, which serves Karaganda, Astana and Petropavlovsk, on one of the main Transsib routes.

In 1990, Aktogay station, roughly midway between Alma-Ata and Semipalatinsk, became an important junction. Lines from there run east, connecting at Dostyk with China's Lanxin railway Line (toward Urumqi, Lanzhou, and heartland China); and west, to Balkhash and Karaganda.
