= Trans-Aral Railway =

Rail line in Russia, Kazakhstan, and Uzbekistan

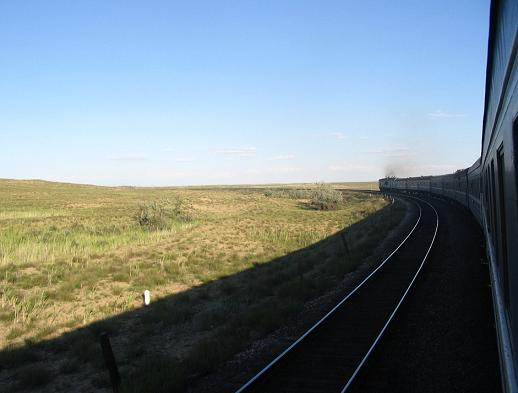
- A view from the train while travelling along the path of the Trans-Aral Railway. Much of the railway cuts across the vast, rolling Kazakh Steppe

Overview
- Other name(s): Tashkent Railway
- Status: Operational
- Owner: Russian Railways (Rostov-on-Don–Iletsk I); Kazakhstan Temir Joly (Karatogay–Arys I); Uzbek Railways (Tashkent–Andizhan I)
- Locale: European Russia; Central Asia
- Termini: Rostov-on-Don; Andizhan I
- Stations: 42

Service
- Type: Inter-city rail; Freight rail
- Operator(s): Russian Railways; Kazakhstan Temir Joly; Uzbek Railways

History
- Commenced: 1888–1906
- Built era: Russian Empire

Technical
- Line length: 9,200 km (5,700 mi)
- Number of tracks: 2
- Character: International rail link
- Track gauge: 1,520 mm (4 ft 11 27/32 in) Russian gauge
- Old gauge: 1,524 mm (5 ft) as built

The Trans-Aral Railway, also known as the Tashkent Railway, is a 1,520 mm (4 ft 11 27/32 in) Russian gauge railway built in 1906 to connect Kinel and Tashkent, both then within the Russian Empire. For much of the early 20th century, it was the only railway link between European Russia and Central Asia.

== Construction history ==
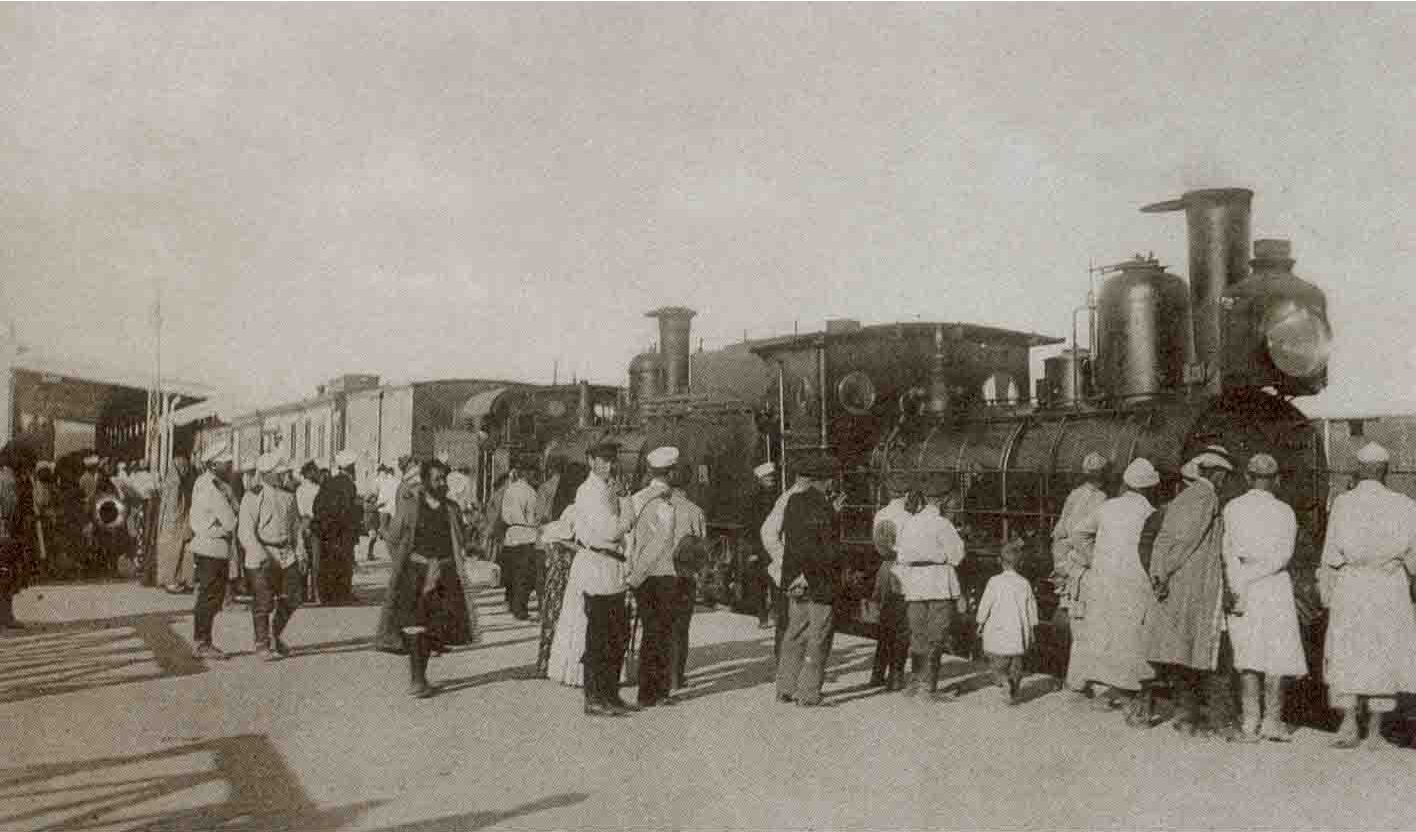
Railway station in Tashkent 1903

There were plans to construct the Orenburg–Tashkent line as early as 1874. Construction work did not start, however, until the autumn of 1900. The railway was simultaneously built from both ends toward a common junction. It opened in January 1906, linking the existing network of Russian and European railways to the Trans-Caspian Railway.

On January 1, 1905, the Kinel–Orenburg section of the Samara–Zlatoust line was joined to the Tashkent railway.

An extensive description of the newly built railway was published in 1910.

The Kinel–Tashkent Railway was the first line to be built across the steppe, replacing the multiple routes once used by caravans with a single, steel path. It introduced the Kazakhs to industrial modernity and tied the distant Governor-Generalship of Turkestan more firmly to the Russian metropole, allowing troops to be rushed to Central Asia and raw cotton to be exported to Moscow's textile mills.

== Economic impact ==
Because of the American Civil War, cotton shot up in price in the 1860s, becoming an increasingly important commodity in the region, although its cultivation was on a much lesser scale than during the Soviet period. The cotton trade led to the construction of these railroads. In the long term, the development of a cotton monoculture would render Turkestan dependent on food imports from Western Siberia, and the Turkestan–Siberia Railway was already planned when the First World War broke out.

== Post-revolutionary period ==
After the revolution the line was blocked by Cossacks under the command of Ataman Dutov. Cut off from food supplies, and unable to sustain itself due to forced cotton cultivation, Russian Turkestan experienced an intense famine. The temporary loss of the Trans-Aral also allowed the Tashkent Soviet a degree of autonomy from Moscow during the period immediately following the Bolshevik takeover, which resulted in atrocities like the Kokand Massacre, in which between 5,000 and 14,000 people were killed.

== Route ==
The line passes through several notable cities in Kazakhstan, including Aktobe, Aral, Qyzylorda, Turkistan, and Shymkent. It connects at Arys with the Turkestan–Siberia rail line toward Almaty, eastern Kazakhstan, and south Siberia.

== See also ==
- Turkestan–Siberia Railway
- Trans-Caspian Railway

== Literature ==
- Hopkirk, Peter, (1984) Setting the East ablaze : Lenin's dream of an empire in Asia, 252 pp., London: John Murray
