= March 1930 =

Month of 1930

<<	March 1930					>>
Su	Mo	Tu	We	Th	Fr	Sa
						1
2	3	4	5	6	7	8
9	10	11	12	13	14	15
16	17	18	19	20	21	22
23	24	25	26	27	28	29
30	31

March 12, 1930: The Mahatma Gandhi and his followers begin the "Salt March" in India

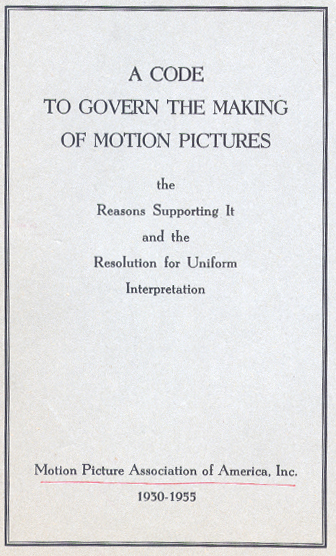
March 31, 1930: U.S. film industry adopts the Hays Code for film censorship

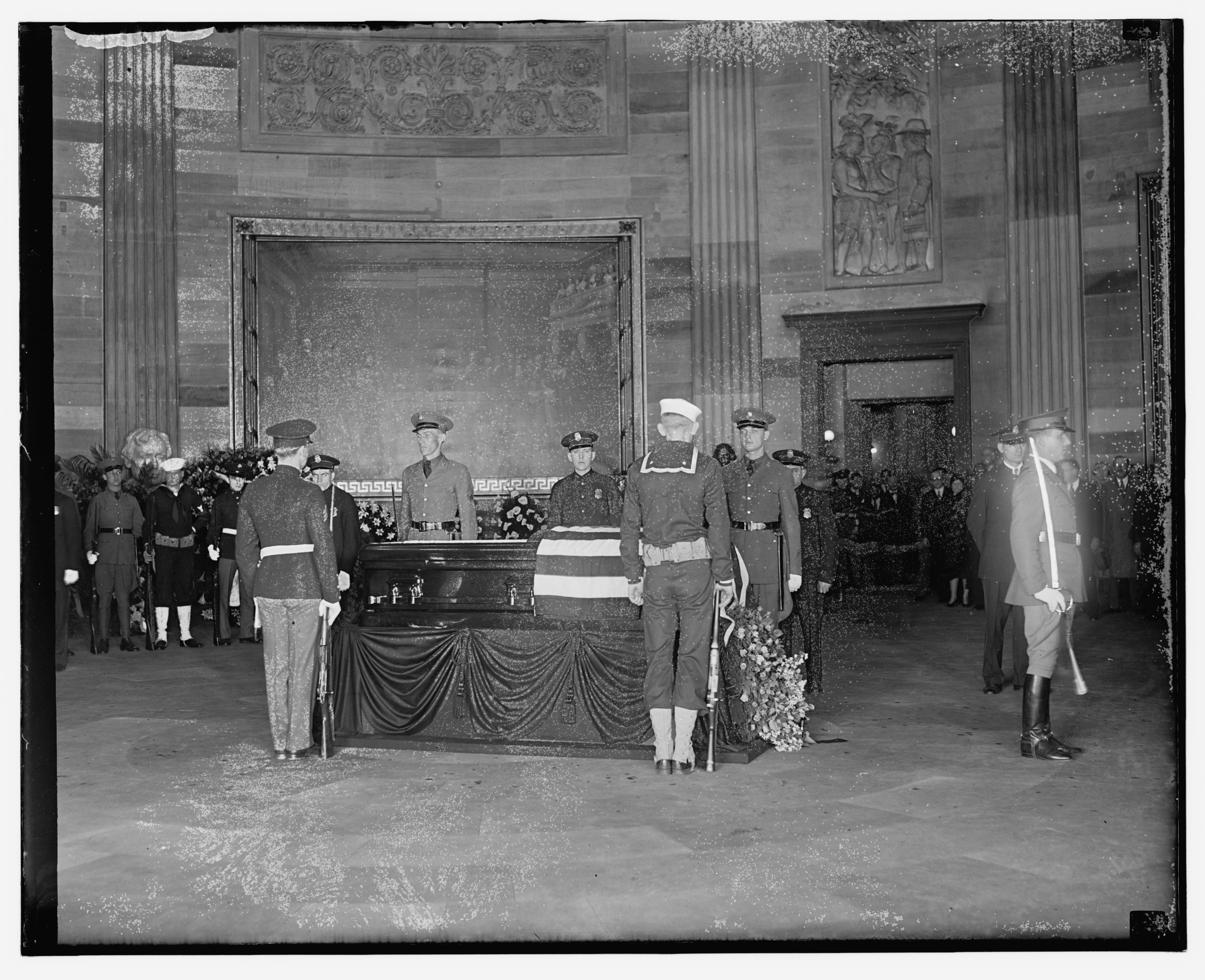
March 11, 1930: Former U.S. President and Chief Justice Taft mourned at U.S. Capitol rotunda after March 8 death

The following events occurred in March 1930:

== Saturday, March 1, 1930 ==
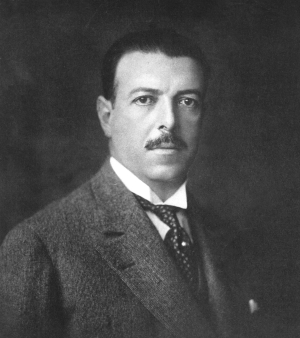
Prestes, elected but will not serve

- Júlio Prestes, the Governor of the São Paulo state, won the Brazilian presidential election, winning 57% of the vote. Scheduled to succeed President Washington Luís, Prestes would never take office because of the overthrow of the Luís government and the cancellation of the scheduled inauguration.
- German President Paul von Hindenburg recommended that German centrists support the Hermann Müller government as it attempted to impose a "national sacrifice tax" to eliminate the deficit and pay doles to the unemployed.
- The British government reconsidered the idea of a Channel tunnel to overcome France's demands to maintain a huge navy that had left the London Naval Conference deadlocked.

== Sunday, March 2, 1930 ==
- André Tardieu returned as Prime Minister of France.
- A letter by Joseph Stalin appeared in Moscow newspapers warning communist officials to ease their campaign of collectivization. "We cannot collectivize farmers by force", Stalin wrote. "This is foolish and reactionary. Healthy collectivization must be based upon the active support of the bulk of the peasantry." The letter was published amid reports that thousands of Russian peasants were fleeing across the border to Poland.
- Horacio Vásquez resigned as President of the Dominican Republic.
- Indian resistance leader Mahatma Gandhi informed the British Viceroy of India that civil disobedience would begin the following week.
- Died: D. H. Lawrence, 44, English writer, poet and controversial painter, of tuberculosis at his home in France.

== Monday, March 3, 1930 ==
- Two hundred people in France were killed in flooding in the southwest of the country.
- Rafael Estrella Ureña became acting President of the Dominican Republic.
- Born:
  - Ion Iliescu, President of Romania from 1989 to 1996, after the overthrow and execution of Nicolae Ceaușescu; in Oltenița (d. 2025)
  - Heiner Geißler, German politician who led the Christian Democratic Union in West Germany; in Oberndorf am Neckar (d. 2017)
  - K. S. Rajah, Senior Counsel and former Judicial Commissioner of the Supreme Court of Singapore, in Perai, Straits Settlements (d. 2010)

== Tuesday, March 4, 1930 ==
- The London Naval Disarmament Conference reopened after two weeks' adjournment due to the French cabinet crisis.

== Wednesday, March 5, 1930 ==
- London stockbrokers Buckmaster & Moore caused a stir in the British banking world when they issued a circular to clients advising them to sell their shares in British industry and invest in the United States and Canada instead. It expressed the opinion that England's business depression was part of a permanent decline, while "the economic, the political and climatic advantages of the United States and Canada in the next few decades will be so overwhelmingly great that these countries offer the most attractive field for investment."
- Danish painter Einar Wegener began sex reassignment surgery in Germany, and took the name Lili Elbe.
- Born: Del Crandall, American baseball catcher and the last of the Boston Braves; in Ontario, California (d. 2021)

== Thursday, March 6, 1930 ==
- Packaged frozen food was sold in supermarkets for the first time, with an introduction of Birdseye products in 18 stores in Springfield, Massachusetts United States.
- Communists staged an international day of protest against hunger and unemployment. Police and demonstrators clashed in Berlin, New York, London, Paris, Washington, and other cities.
- Born:
  - Allison Hayes, American actress and model, in Charleston, West Virginia (d. 1977)
  - Lorin Maazel, French violinist, composer and conductor; in Neuilly-sur-Seine, France (d. 2014)
- Died: Grand Admiral Alfred von Tirpitz, 80, Prussian naval officer who built the Imperial German Navy into a world power

== Friday, March 7, 1930 ==
- Hjalmar Schacht resigned as President of Germany's Reichsbank, explaining he could not agree to the ratification of the Young Plan in its present version because it had been "adulterated by politicians in the last fourteen months."
- U.S. President Herbert Hoover said that all evidence indicated "that the worst effects of the crash upon unemployment will have been passed during the next sixty days with the amelioration of seasonal unemployment, the gaining strength of other forces, and the continued cooperation of the many agencies actively cooperating with the government to restore business and to relieve distress."
- Born: Antony Armstrong-Jones, 1st Earl of Snowdon, English photographer and filmmaker who was the husband of Princess Margaret of the United Kingdom from 1960 until their divorce in 1978; London (d. 2017)

== Saturday, March 8, 1930 ==
- The Mahatma Gandhi's followers adopted a resolution declaring that they would achieve self-governance for India or go to jail.
- Babe Ruth reached a contract agreement with the New York Yankees that would pay him $80,000 a year for the next two seasons.
- Spain denied political asylum to Leon Trotsky.
- Born: Hector Lombana, Colombian sculptor, painter and architect; in Riofrío, Magdalena Department (d. 2008)
- Died: William Howard Taft, 72, 27th President of the United States and 10th Chief Justice of the United States; Taft died at 5:15 in the afternoon, having never regained consciousness after going into a coma. President Hoover issued a proclamation that night declaring 30 days of official mourning.

== Sunday, March 9, 1930 ==
- The political satirical opera Rise and Fall of the City of Mahagonny by Kurt Weill and Bertolt Brecht premiered at the Neues Theatre in Leipzig, Germany. Nazis surrounded the opera house protesting the performance, and police had to break up a disturbance near the end of the show.
- Born: Ornette Coleman, jazz musician, in Fort Worth, Texas (d. 2015)

== Monday, March 10, 1930 ==
- A fire in Japanese Korea killed 105 people, most of them the children of Japanese naval officers, who had gathered at a warehouse at the Chinkai Guard District to watch a film commemorating the 25th anniversary of Japan's victory over Russia in the Battle of Mukden. The 105 were part of 600 who had assembled to watch the film.
- Born: Claude Bolling, French jazz musician, in Cannes (d. 2020)

== Tuesday, March 11, 1930 ==
- Former German Chancellor Hans Luther was elected the new president of the Reichsbank.
- Germany's Reichstag approved the modified Young Plan.
- William Howard Taft was buried at Arlington National Cemetery.

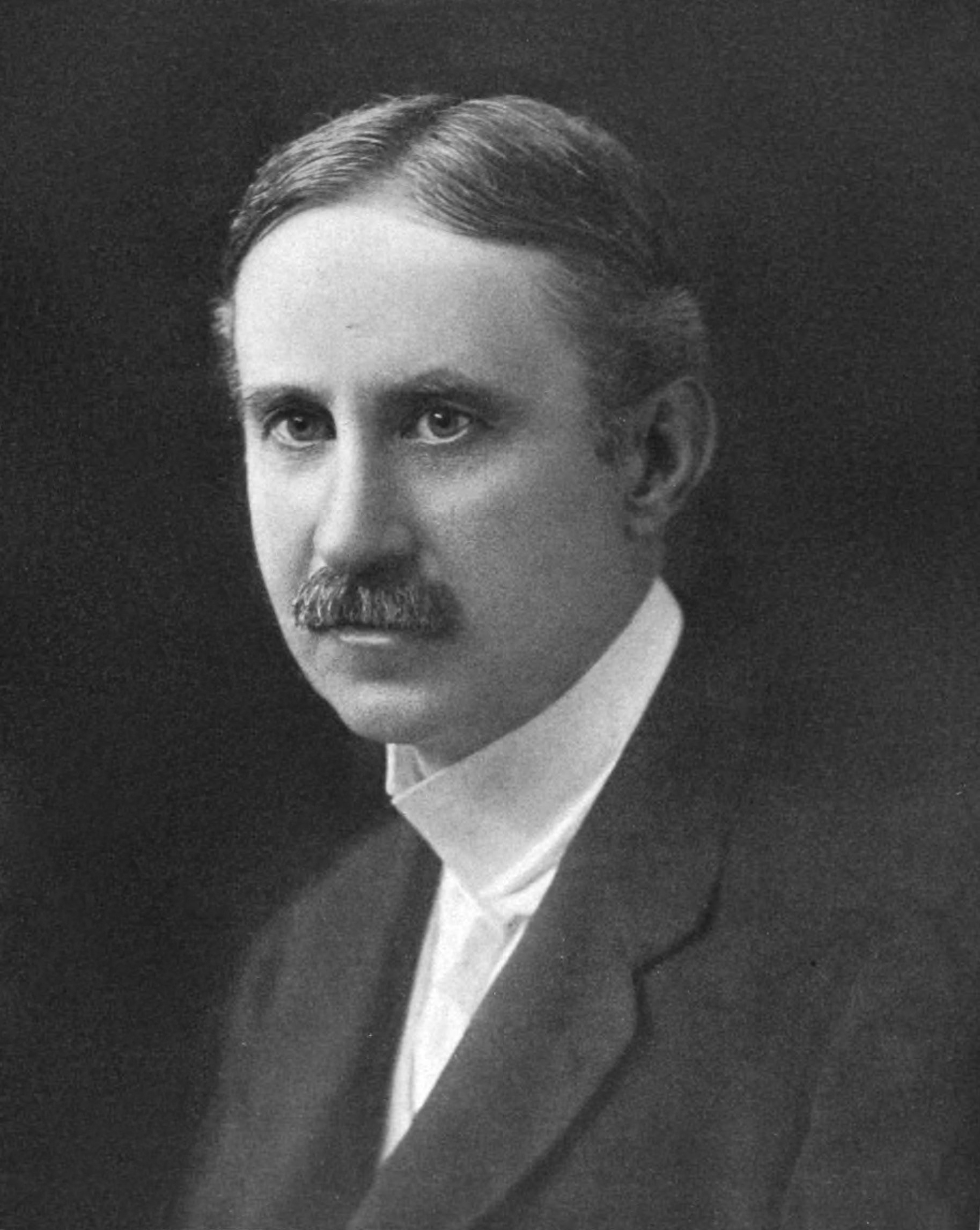
Albee

- Died: E. F. Albee, 72, American entrepreneur, booking agent and co-founder of the Keith-Albee theater circuit and its associated Vaudeville Managers Association (VMA) booking consortium.

== Wednesday, March 12, 1930 ==
- The Mahatma Gandhi began his "march to the sea" in defiance of India's salt tax.
- The London Naval Conference was jeopardized when French Foreign Minister Aristide Briand walked out.
- Born: Vern Law, American baseball pitcher and 1960 Cy Young Award winner; in Meridian, Idaho
- Died: RCAF Lieutenant Colonel William G. "Billy" Barker, 35, Canadian ace fighter pilot and the most decorated serviceman in Canadian history, killed in a plane crash while demonstrating a biplane trainer.

== Thursday, March 13, 1930 ==
- German President Paul von Hindenburg signed the Young Plan into law.
- The discovery of Pluto was announced to the world.
- Born: Liz Anderson, American country musician, in Roseau, Minnesota (d. 2011)

== Friday, March 14, 1930 ==
- A committee, by a majority of four to one, endorsed the construction of a tunnel from England to France under the English Channel.

== Saturday, March 15, 1930 ==
- André Tardieu arrived in London attempting to salvage the London Conference.
- The Polish cabinet tried to quit, but President Ignacy Mościcki refused to accept their resignations with the national budget still incomplete.
- Born: Zhores Alferov, Soviet Russian physicist and 2000 Nobel Prize laureate for his development of semiconductor heterojunction; in Vitebsk, Byelorussian SSR, Soviet Union (d. 2019)

== Sunday, March 16, 1930 ==
- Nine U.S. Navy sailors were injured in Manila during race riots with Filipino residents resentful of news of U.S. discrimination.
- Died: Miguel Primo de Rivera, 60, the former premier and dictator of Spain, of diabetes, six weeks after being forced out of office. He was found dead by his daughter in a Paris hotel room, where he had been preparing to go to the German spa town of Wiesbaden to seek treatment.

== Monday, March 17, 1930 ==
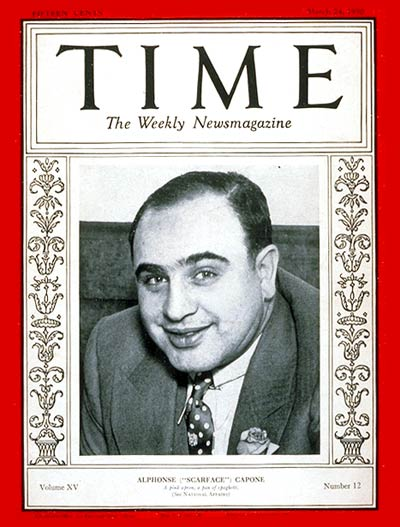
Capone on the March 24, 1930 cover of TIME

- Al Capone was released from a Philadelphia prison after serving ten months for illegal possession of a firearm.
- The popular US adventure comic strip Scorchy Smith first appeared.
- Poland and Germany signed a trade agreement.
- The U.S. Supreme Court decided Lucas v. Earl.
- Born: James B. Irwin, U.S. astronaut on the Apollo 15 mission and the eighth person to walk on the Moon; in Pittsburgh (d. 1991)

== Tuesday, March 18, 1930 ==
- The U.S. Senate restored provisions for censorship of imports of foreign literature.
- British Ministry of Labour figures showed that 1,563,800 people were out of work in the UK during the week ending March 10, an increase of over 15,500 over the previous week.
- Born: Adam Maida, Roman Catholic Cardinal and Archbishop of Detroit; in East Vandergrift, Pennsylvania

== Wednesday, March 19, 1930 ==
- Pope Pius XI opened his campaign of prayer against religious persecution in the Soviet Union before a capacity crowd in St. Peter's Basilica. Similar services were held in Catholic churches worldwide.
- Died: Arthur Balfour, 81, Prime Minister of the United Kingdom from 1902 to 1905, author of the Balfour Declaration

== Thursday, March 20, 1930 ==
- The Mahatma Gandhi arrived in Kareli (now part of India's Madhya Pradesh) state during the Salt March and instructed villagers to refuse to fetch water for the British government tax collector or any other holders of the office in India.
- Born: Willie Thrower, American football player and the first African-American quarterback in the NFL (for the Chicago Bears in 1953); in New Kensington, Pennsylvania (d. 2002)

== Friday, March 21, 1930 ==
- Wireless service between Germany and Brazil was inaugurated.
- The Chilean Air Force was created by an amalgamation of the aviation divisions of the Chilean Army and the Chilean Navy.

== Saturday, March 22, 1930 ==
- A memorial service was held for Arthur Balfour in Westminster Abbey while he was buried in Whittingehame, Scotland. A rough farm cart decorated with leaves and ivy served as his hearse.
- The comedy film Free and Easy, starring Buster Keaton in his first talkie, was released.
- Born:
  - Stephen Sondheim, American musical composer and lyricist for stage and film (including West Side Story), winner of eight Tony Awards, eight Grammy Awards and an Academy Award; in New York City (d. 2021)
  - Pat Robertson, American televangelist and television entrepreneur who used satellite transmission to create the Christian Broadcasting Network; in Lexington, Virginia (d. 2023)

== Sunday, March 23, 1930 ==
- Fascist Italy abolished customs laws dating back to medieval times which had given municipalities the right to levy a tax on farmers entering city gates with their produce.

== Monday, March 24, 1930 ==
- Dino Grandi, head of the Italian delegation at the London Naval Conference, proposed that negotiations be adjourned for six months due to talks being deadlocked.
- Born:
  - David Dacko, the first President of the Central African Republic, near Mbaiki (d. 2003)
  - Steve McQueen, American TV and film actor; in Beech Grove, Indiana (d. 1980)
- Died: Eugeen Van Mieghem, 54, Belgian artist

== Tuesday, March 25, 1930 ==
- The Hamburg America Line and Norddeutscher Lloyd shipping company announced a 50-year merger to end competition due to difficult business conditions.
- American Federation of Labor President William Green published a report saying that the rise of unemployment had been checked, but in eleven American cities unemployment was "still at a very high figure of 20 percent or more out of work."
- Born: John Keel, journalist and UFOlogist; in Hornell, New York (d. 2009)

== Wednesday, March 26, 1930 ==
- The musical drama film Mammy, starring Al Jolson in blackface as a minstrel singer, was released.
- Born: Sandra Day O'Connor, from 1981 to 2006, the first woman to serve as a U.S. Supreme Court Justice; in El Paso, Texas (d. 2023)

== Thursday, March 27, 1930 ==
- Hermann Müller resigned as Chancellor of Germany following disagreements within his coalition government on the issue of unemployment insurance for Germany's 3 million jobless.

== Friday, March 28, 1930 ==
- Turkey officially requested that all countries stop referring to its largest city as Constantinople and call it Istanbul instead.
- Persia adopted the gold standard.
- The British government decided to abolish capital punishment for four crimes in the British army: misbehaviour before the enemy in such a manner as to show cowardice, leaving a guard, picket, patrol or post without orders, intentionally sounding a false alarm and leaving a post when acting as a sentinel. The death penalty for mutiny, treason and desertion was maintained.
- In a speech in Toronto, the Governor General of Canada Viscount Willingdon suggested that Canada take over the British West Indies, explaining that the West Indies had a "feeling of enormous gratitude for the steps taken by Canada following the recent trade agreement" and that they wanted to be "linked directly with Canada."
- Born:
  - Jerome Friedman, American physicist and 1990 Nobel laureate as co-discoverer of the quark; in Chicago
  - Robert Ashley, American operatic composer; in Ann Arbor, Michigan (d. 2014)

== Saturday, March 29, 1930 ==
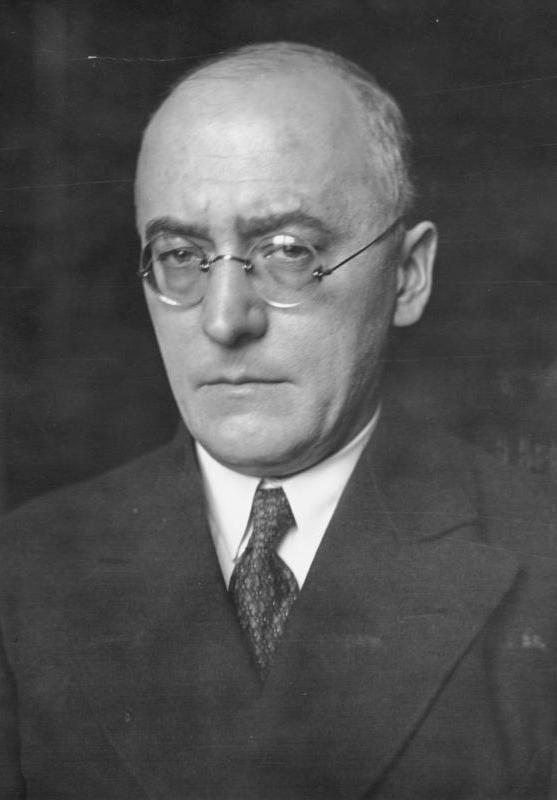
Chancellor Brüning

- Paul von Hindenburg appointed Heinrich Brüning to be the new Chancellor of Germany.
- The French Chamber of Deputies ratified the Young Plan by an overwhelming vote of 530 to 55.

== Sunday, March 30, 1930 ==
- Australian Prime Minister James Scullin laid out the seriousness of the country's economic problems, including a 13% unemployment rate, at a conference of state premiers in Canberra. "Australia must realize she must export in the next few years as much produce as she can", Scullin said. "This means Australia must do with fewer luxuries and with less of foreign-made goods."
- Born:
  - John Astin, American TV and film actor best known for The Addams Family; in Baltimore, Maryland
  - Rolf Harris, Australian musician, artist, and convicted sex offender; in Bassendean, Western Australia (d. 2023)
  - Takeshi Kaikō, Japanese writer; in Tennoji-ku, Osaka (d. 1989)

== Monday, March 31, 1930 ==
- The Motion Picture Association of America agreed to abide by the new Motion Picture Production Code, more popularly known as the Hays Code, which laid out a set of moral guidelines for the content of films.
- The Battle of Anchem was fought in Ethiopia between two factions of the country's royal family.
