= May 1930 =

Month of 1930

<<	May 1930					>>
Su	Mo	Tu	We	Th	Fr	Sa
				1	2	3
4	5	6	7	8	9	10
11	12	13	14	15	16	17
18	19	20	21	22	23	24
25	26	27	28	29	30	31

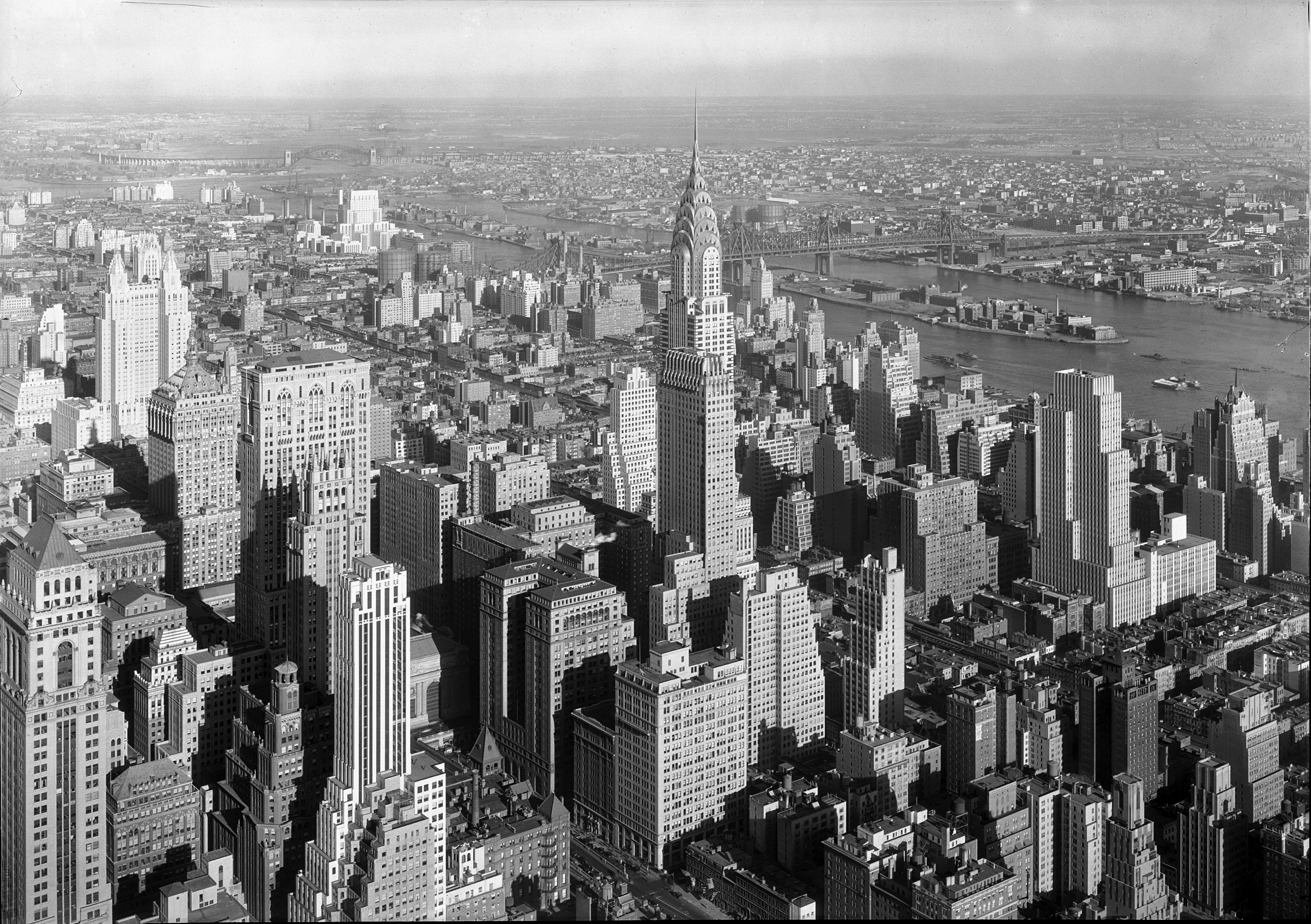
May 27, 1930 The Chrysler Building, at 77 floors the tallest skyscraper in the world up to that time, opens to the public

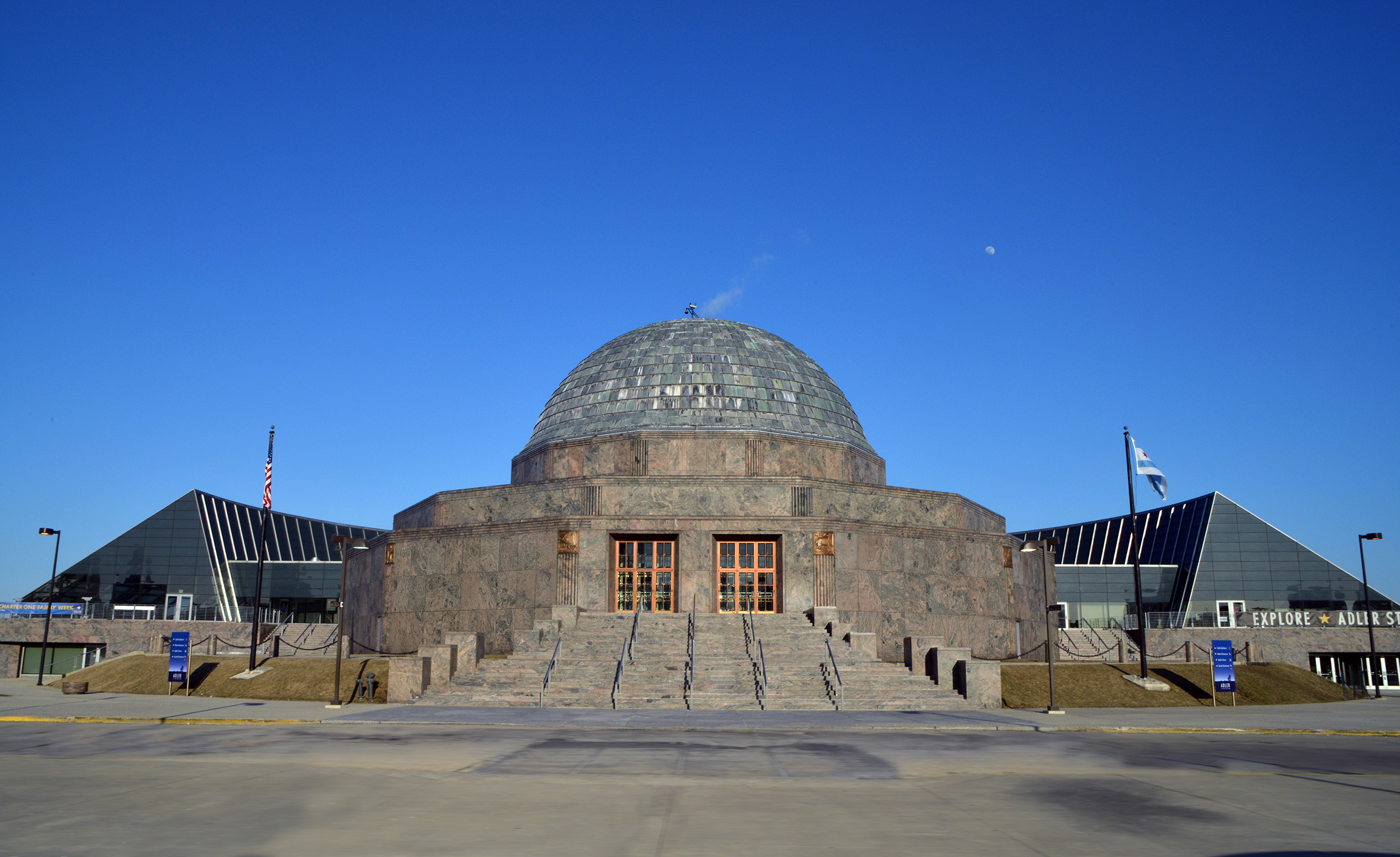
May 12, 1930: Adler Planetarium opens in Chicago

The following events occurred in May 1930:

== Thursday, May 1, 1930 ==
- Eighteen people were killed in a series of tornadoes that swept the Midwestern United States.
- As the Great Depression continued, U.S. President Herbert Hoover told a gathering of American businessmen in Washington that "I am convinced that we have now passed the worst and with continued unity of effort, we shall rapidly recover."

== Friday, May 2, 1930 ==
- New York Police Commissioner Grover Whalen publicized a series of letters which he said were evidence of the Communist International financing riots and strikes in the United States. Amtorg Trading Corporation chairman Peter Bogdanov released a statement saying the letters alleged to have been written by an Amtorg official were forgeries.
- Canada's Finance Minister introduced the Dunning Tariff as response to the Smoot–Hawley Tariff Act passed by the U.S. Congress and awaiting the President's signature. Canada's most drastic tariff revision since 1907, the tariff raised duties on American goods while giving preferential treatment to British goods.
- Died: Isidor Gunsberg, 75, Austro-Hungarian chess player

== Saturday, May 3, 1930 ==
- The Widnes Vikings defeated St. Helens, 10–3, to win the Northern Rugby Football League's Challenge Cup.
- Born:
  - Juan Gelman, Argentine poet, in Buenos Aires (d. 2014)
  - Bob Havens, big band and jazz trombonist; in Quincy, Illinois

== Sunday, May 4, 1930 ==
- The Crown Hill Fire destroyed over 200 homes in Nashua, New Hampshire. Damage was estimated at $3 million.
- Born:
  - Lois de Banzie, Scottish-born U.S. stage actress, in Glasgow (d. 2021)
  - Roberta Peters, American opera soprano; in the Bronx (d. 2017)
  - Katherine Jackson, matriarch of the Jackson musical family, in Barbour County, Alabama

== Monday, May 5, 1930 ==
- A 7.5 magnitude earthquake struck southern Burma (now Myanmar), killing at least 500 people.
- The Mahatma Gandhi was arrested at Karadi, near Dandi.
- The German airline Lufthansa began round-the-clock airmail service between Berlin and Istanbul.
- The New York Times printed an open letter; to President Hoover; from 1,028 economists asking him to veto the Smoot–Hawley tariff bill.
- A scandal broke in the art world when it was revealed that many paintings attributed to Jean-François Millet were actually forgeries created under the direction of Millet's own grandson.

== Tuesday, May 6, 1930 ==
- The 7.1 magnitude Salmas earthquake struck northwestern Iran and southeastern Turkey with a maximum Mercalli intensity of X (Extreme), killing at least 1,360 people.
- Outbursts of rioting around India in reaction to the arrest of Mahatma Gandhi killed about 20 people.
- The all-metal Boeing Monomail plane had its first flight.
- Japan capitulated to Chinese boycotts of Japanese goods by signing a tariff agreement with China.

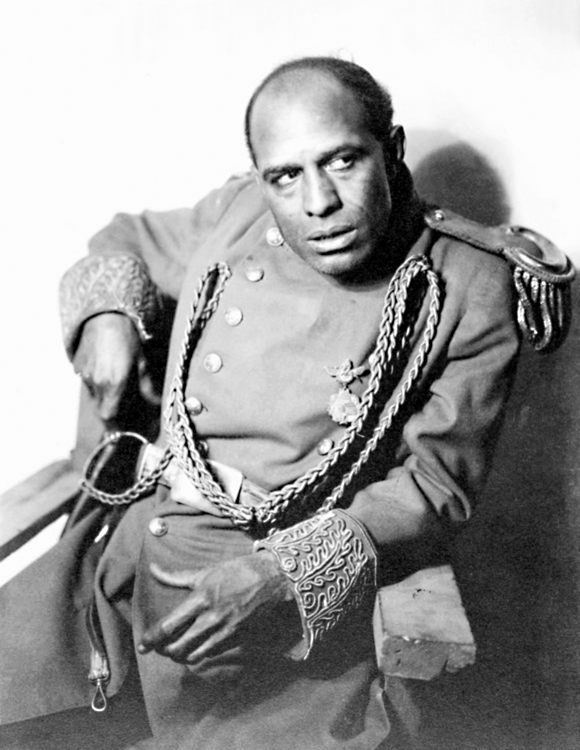
Gilpin as Jones in 1920

- Died: Charles Sidney Gilpin, 51, African-American stage actor known for starring in the title role of The Emperor Jones

== Wednesday, May 7, 1930 ==
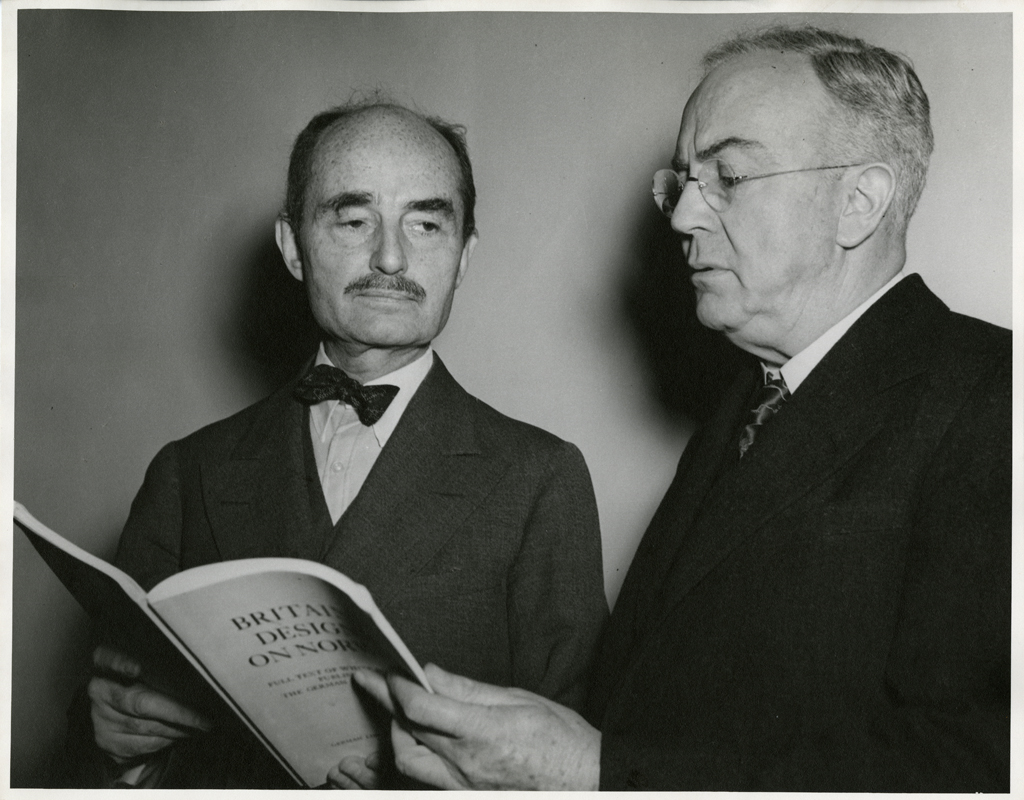
Judge Parker (right)

- The U.S. Senate rejected President Hoover's Supreme Court Justice nominee, John J. Parker, by a vote of only 39 for, and 41 against his confirmation.
- Born: Totie Fields (stage name for Sophie Feldman); American comedienne; in Hartford, Connecticut (d. 1978)

== Thursday, May 8, 1930 ==
- Twenty-seven people were reported dead in the textile manufacturing city of Solapur as rioting continued in India.
- Tourists were permitted to enter the forbidden city of Samarkand for the first time in the Soviet era.
- Born:
  - Gary Snyder, American poet and philosopher, in San Francisco
  - Heather Harper, operatic soprano, in Belfast, Northern Ireland (d. 2019)

== Friday, May 9, 1930 ==
- A mob in Sherman, Texas, burned down a courthouse during the trial of African-American man George Hughes, who was accused of assaulting his boss' wife, a white woman. The mob attacked the courthouse vault, retrieved the dead body of Hughes, dragged it behind an automobile and hanged it from a tree. National Guard troops were sent to Sherman to restore order as the mob looted stores in the black business district.
- Gallant Fox won the Preakness Stakes horse race.
- Born: Joan Sims, English stage and television comedian and actress, known for the "Carry On" series of TV movies; in Laindon, England (d. 2001)

== Saturday, May 10, 1930 ==
- Texas Governor Dan Moody placed the city of Sherman under martial law, 14 rioters were to be placed under arrest by the state national guard.
- The National Pan-Hellenic Council was formed on the campus of Howard University in Washington.
- Born: Pat Summerall, American NFL kicker and later popular television sportscaster; in Lake City, Florida (d. 2013)

== Sunday, May 11, 1930 ==
- New York Police Commissioner Whalen issued a report saying that the city's violent crime in 1929 went down 11% from 1928, although the number of murders increased from 339 to 357.
- Born:
  - Edsger W. Dijkstra, Dutch computer scientist; in Rotterdam (d. 2002)
  - Bud Ekins, American film stuntman; in Hollywood, California (d. 2007)

== Monday, May 12, 1930 ==
- Abbas Tyabji, the acting leader of the Indian civil disobedience movement since the arrest of Gandhi, was himself arrested in Navsari along with all his immediate followers.
- Adler Planetarium, founded by businessman Max Adler, opened to the public in Chicago.

== Tuesday, May 13, 1930 ==
- The British Ministry of Labour reported that 1.7 million were unemployed.
- Born: Mike Gravel, American politician, former Senator of Alaska (1969–1981) and Presidential candidate (2008 and 2020), in Springfield, Massachusetts (d. 2021)
- Died: Fridtjof Nansen, 68, Norwegian explorer, scientist, humanitarian and Nobel Peace Prize laureate

== Wednesday, May 14, 1930 ==
- Carlsbad Caverns in New Mexico was established as a National Park.

== Thursday, May 15, 1930 ==
- Sarojini Naidu led a march of volunteers on the Dharasana salt works. When they were blocked by police they sat down and waited the whole day as the police watched.
- Born: Jasper Johns, painter and printmaker, in Augusta, Georgia
- Died: William John Locke, 67, English novelist and playwright

== Friday, May 16, 1930 ==
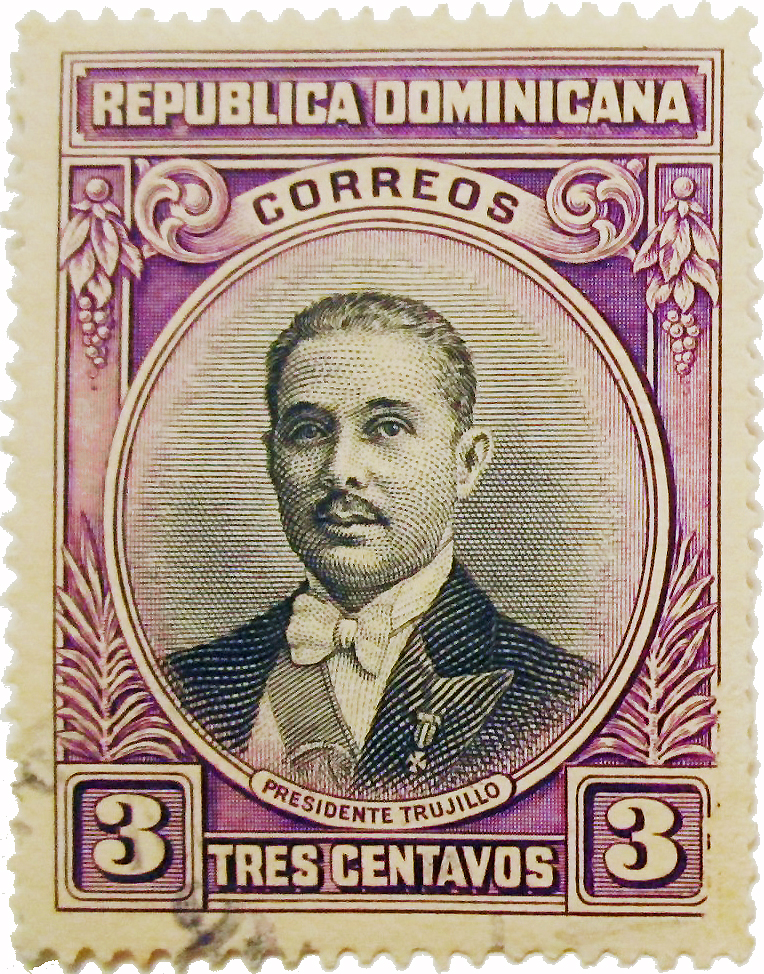
President Trujillo

- Rafael Trujillo was elected President of the Dominican Republic for the first time, beginning a control of the nation that would last until his 1961 assassination, as rival candidates boycotted the general elections in protest after charging that members of the body overseeing the election had been appointed illegally.

== Saturday, May 17, 1930 ==
- The Young Plan adjusting the terms of Germany's war reparations to France and Belgium, went into effect.
- Gallant Fox won the Kentucky Derby horse race.
- French Foreign Minister Aristide Briand submitted his plan for a United States of Europe to the 26 European members of the League of Nations.
- The British government announced the restriction of Jewish immigration to Palestine.

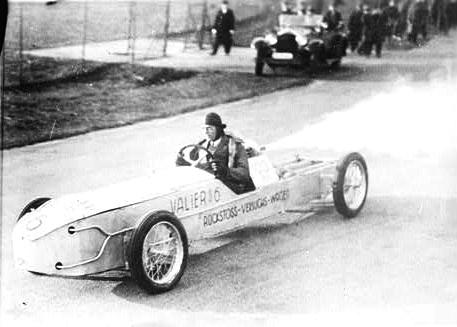
Valier in his rocket-powered car, a month before his death

- Died:
  - Herbert Croly, 61, American editor and political philosopher
  - Max Valier, 35, Austrian rocketry engineer, was killed by the explosion in his laboratory of a rocket engine that he was testing.

== Sunday, May 18, 1930 ==
- The Austrian Heimwehr declared their opposition to democracy and support for a dictatorship at their annual meeting.

== Monday, May 19, 1930 ==
- Servants joined the Indian civil disobedience movement by refusing to provide services to anyone wearing foreign-made fabrics.
- White women in South Africa were given the right to vote.
- Born: Lorraine Hansberry, playwright and writer, in Chicago (d. 1965)

== Tuesday, May 20, 1930 ==
- Sir Oswald Mosley quit as Chancellor of the Duchy of Lancaster due to disagreements with Prime Minister Ramsay MacDonald over the government's unemployment policy. Mosley would be replaced by Clement Attlee.

== Wednesday, May 21, 1930 ==
- Sarojini Naidu was arrested at Dharasana.
- An interview was published of the questions posed by British journalist George Slocombe to India's Mohandas K. Gandhi, conducted in Yerwada Central Jail. Giving his first interview since his recent re-arrest, Gandhi clarified the conditions to be met before the civil disobedience campaign would be called off, said he was alarmed by the reports of violence and expressed optimism about the movement's future. "In forty years of struggle I have frequently been told that I was attempting the impossible, but invariably I have proved the contrary", he said.
- Born: Malcolm Fraser, Prime Minister of Australia from 1975 to 1983; in Toorak, Victoria (d. 2015)

== Thursday, May 22, 1930 ==
- The High Commissioner of the Levant introduced a new constitution turning Syria and Latakia into republics with representative government. Latakia would be reincorporated into Syria in 1937.
- Born:
  - Harvey Milk, San Francisco politician and gay rights activist; in Woodmere, New York (shot to death, 1978)
  - Agustín Tosco, Argentine union leader (d. 1975)

== Friday, May 23, 1930 ==
- The Literary Digest, an influential American magazine, published the results of its nationwide poll on Prohibition in which over 4.8 million opinions were recorded. 40% favored outright repeal of the Eighteenth Amendment, 29% voted to have the law modified, and 30% wanted the existing law maintained. Prohibition was most strongly favored in the state of Kansas, while Nevada was the "wettest" state.
- The German war film Westfront 1918 premiered at the Capitol Theatre in Berlin.
- The Italian cargo steamship Teti, transporting granite cubes, ran aground on the islet of Mali Barjak northwest of Komiža; all crew survived, and the ship sank months later.

== Saturday, May 24, 1930 ==
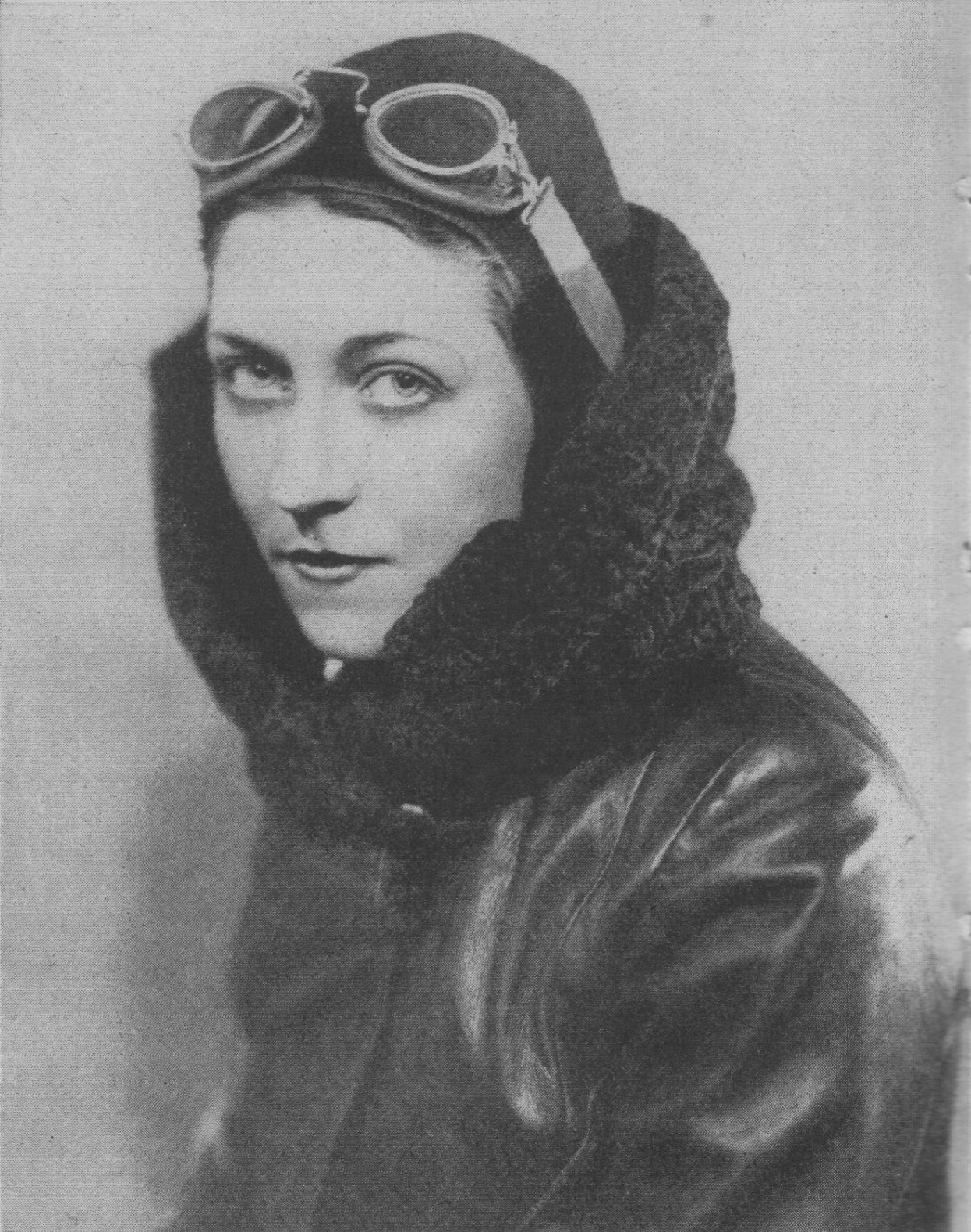
Amy Johnson

- English aviator Amy Johnson landed in Port Darwin, Australia and became the first woman to fly solo from England to Australia.
- Muslim leaders in India issued a statement calling on Muslims to join the independence movement, which had been chiefly a Hindu-led campaign up to this point.
- Police in Düsseldorf apprehended serial killer Peter Kürten. After his conviction for murder, Kürten would be executed by guillotine on July 2, 1931.
- The 1930 Far Eastern Championship Games began as the ninth edition of the regional multi-sport event taking place in Tokyo capital of the Empire of Japan. A total of eight sports were contested over the course of the five-day event.

== Sunday, May 25, 1930 ==
- The George Antheil opera Transatlantic premiered in Frankfurt.
- Died: Randall Davidson, 82, Archbishop of Canterbury 1903–1928

== Monday, May 26, 1930 ==
- The International Olympic Committee selected Berlin to be the host of the 1936 Summer Olympics.
- Rioting in various sections of British India left a reported 35 people dead.
- An association representing the Nazi Party purchased a new headquarters in Munich that would come to be known as the Der Braunes Haus, the Brown House.

== Tuesday, May 27, 1930 ==
- The Chrysler Building in New York City opened to the public. It was the new tallest building in the world at the time, but it only held the title for a year before the Empire State Building was completed.
- The war film Hell's Angels premiered at Grauman's Chinese Theatre in Hollywood.
- Born:: John Barth, American novelist; in Cambridge, Maryland (d. 2024)

== Wednesday, May 28, 1930 ==
- U.S. President Herbert Hoover penned his first veto, striking down a bill that would have expanded pensions for veterans of the Spanish–American War.
- President Hoover also signed the draft resolution designating April 14 as Pan American Day.

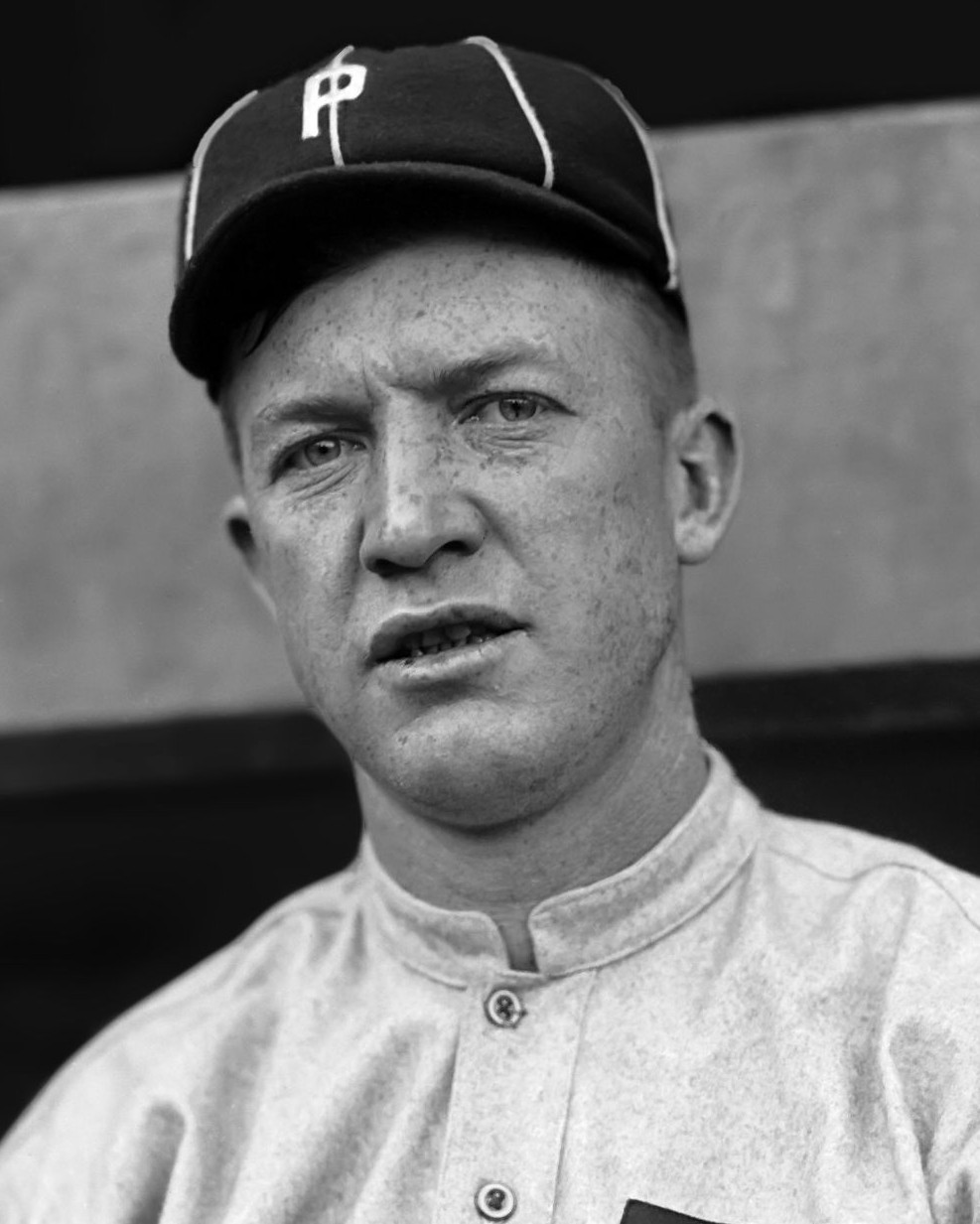
Grover Cleveland Alexander

- Grover Cleveland Alexander appeared in his final major league game, giving up a couple of unearned runs pitching two innings of relief for the Philadelphia Phillies during a 5–1 loss to the Boston Braves.
- Born: Frank Drake, U.S. astronomer and astrophysicist, known for postulating the Drake equation to estimate the probability of locating civilized life forms outside of Earth's solar system, and pioneer of using radio telescope technology as part of the SETI program to find evidence of extraterrestrial intelligence; in Chicago (d. 2022)

== Thursday, May 29, 1930 ==
- A group of 600 members of the French chapter of the Society for the Prevention of Cruelty to Animals (Société pour la prévention de la cruauté envers les animaux, which also abbreviated to SPCA) stormed a bullfight in Paris and started a riot by throwing a smoke bomb and other projectiles. Seventeen women were arrested. Bullfighting was illegal in France, but the promoters had promised that there would be no bloodshed.

== Friday, May 30, 1930 ==
- Billy Arnold won the Indianapolis 500.
- Canadian daredevil William "Red" Hill journeyed through the rapids of the Niagara River, starting at the base of Niagara Falls, while protecting himself inside a steel barrel.
- The date for new elections for the Canadian House of Commons was set, with voting to take place nationwide on July 28.

== Saturday, May 31, 1930 ==
- Italian finance minister Antonio Mosconi announced a budget deficit for the year ending April 30, the country's first deficit since the Fascists came to power. Mosconi maintained that the difficult economic conditions in Italy were the result of general conditions throughout the world.
- Joseph Goebbels was fined 800 Reichsmarks for libeling President Paul von Hindenburg in an article published in the December 29, 1929, issue of Der Angriff. Goebbels defended himself confidently in court and wrote in his diary afterward that the whole trial had been "brilliant propaganda for us."
- The Brazilian football club Esporte Clube Siderúrgica was founded.
- Born:
  - Clint Eastwood (Clinton Eastwood, Jr.), American TV and film actor, later a filmmaker and politician; in San Francisco, California
  - Paul L. Maier, U.S. historian noted for books about the history of Christianity, and novelist; in Clayton, Missouri (d. 2025)
- Died: Gaspar Milazzo, 43, Italian-born American mobster in Detroit, was killed by two rival gunmen after being lured to a restaurant on the pretext of discussing a truce between the East Side mob, led by Milazzo's boss Angelo Meli, and the West Side mob of "Big Chet" La Mare. Milazzo and his driver Sam Parrino were shot to death by two gunmen, apparently sent by La Mare in hopes of killing Meli.
