= Turksib (film) =

1929 film

- Directed by: Viktor Alexandrovich Turin
- Written by: Efim Aron; Aleksandr Macheret; Viktor Shklovsky; Victor A. Turin
- Cinematography: Boris Frantsisson; Yevgeni Slavinsky
- Production company: Vostokkino
- Release date: 24 May 1930
- Country: Soviet Union
- Language: Russian

Turksib (1929) by Viktor Alexandrovich Turin

Turksib (Russian: Турксиб) is a 1929 Soviet documentary film directed by Viktor Alexandrovich Turin documenting the building of the Turkestan–Siberia Railway. The rail line stretched northeast from Tashkent to Almaty and on to Novosibirsk. The film contrasts the open desert and sand, with the order of rails and the movement of machines. The Turkic people ride horses and camels and rear sheep. This drama is set against the dry steppe as it is converted into a cotton-growing region.

"Turksib" was particularly appreciated by the classic British and Canadian documentary filmmaker John Grierson, who prepared the English version of the picture.

The film was released on DVD and Blu-ray by the British Film Institute in 2011 as part of The Soviet Influence: From Turksib to Night Mail, with a newly commissioned soundtrack by Guy Bartell of British group Bronnt Industries Kapital.

== Plot ==
The film tells the story of the construction of the Turkestan–Siberia Railway and its role in the development of Semirechye. The filmmakers successfully capture both the enthusiasm of the builders and the amazement of the desert inhabitants as they witness a train traveling along tracks laid in the sand.

The film begins with credits explaining the importance of the railway to the Soviet Union, as a route for transporting cotton from Turkestan. The film is divided into five "acts." The first act focuses on the importance of water for Turkestan and its rarity. Scenes of cracked earth are juxtaposed with shots of snowmelt in the mountains and streams flowing into the valleys (this scene was later repeated in both American and French films).

The second act shows the slow and impractical traditional methods of transportation (camels and donkeys in the Middle Asian simoom and horse-drawn sleds in Siberia), emphasizing the need for new transportation methods to carry grain over thousands of kilometers.

The third act depicts the work of topographers, the "vanguard of civilization," as they survey the land, are welcomed by the local nomads, and the development of the future railway route in Alma-Ata.

The fourth act shows the actual process of laying tracks through the sands and rocks, the completed road, and local nomads from nearby tribes racing alongside the train.

The fifth act provides a brief recap of the previous scenes and announces that the work will be completed by 1930, the last year of the First Five-Year Plan.
