= Aynabulaq =

Aynabulaq Айнабұлақ
- Village
- Location in Kazakhstan
- Coordinates: 44°36′N 77°56′E
- Country: Kazakhstan
- Region: Jetisu Region
- District: Koksu District

Population (2009)
  - Total: 754
- Time zone: UTC+6 (Omsk Time)
- Postal code: 041201

Aynabulaq (Kazakh: Айнабұлақ, Ainabūlaq) is a village in Jetisu Region of south-eastern Kazakhstan.
