= Arys, Kazakhstan =

Town in Turkistan Region of Kazakhstan

Arys Арыс
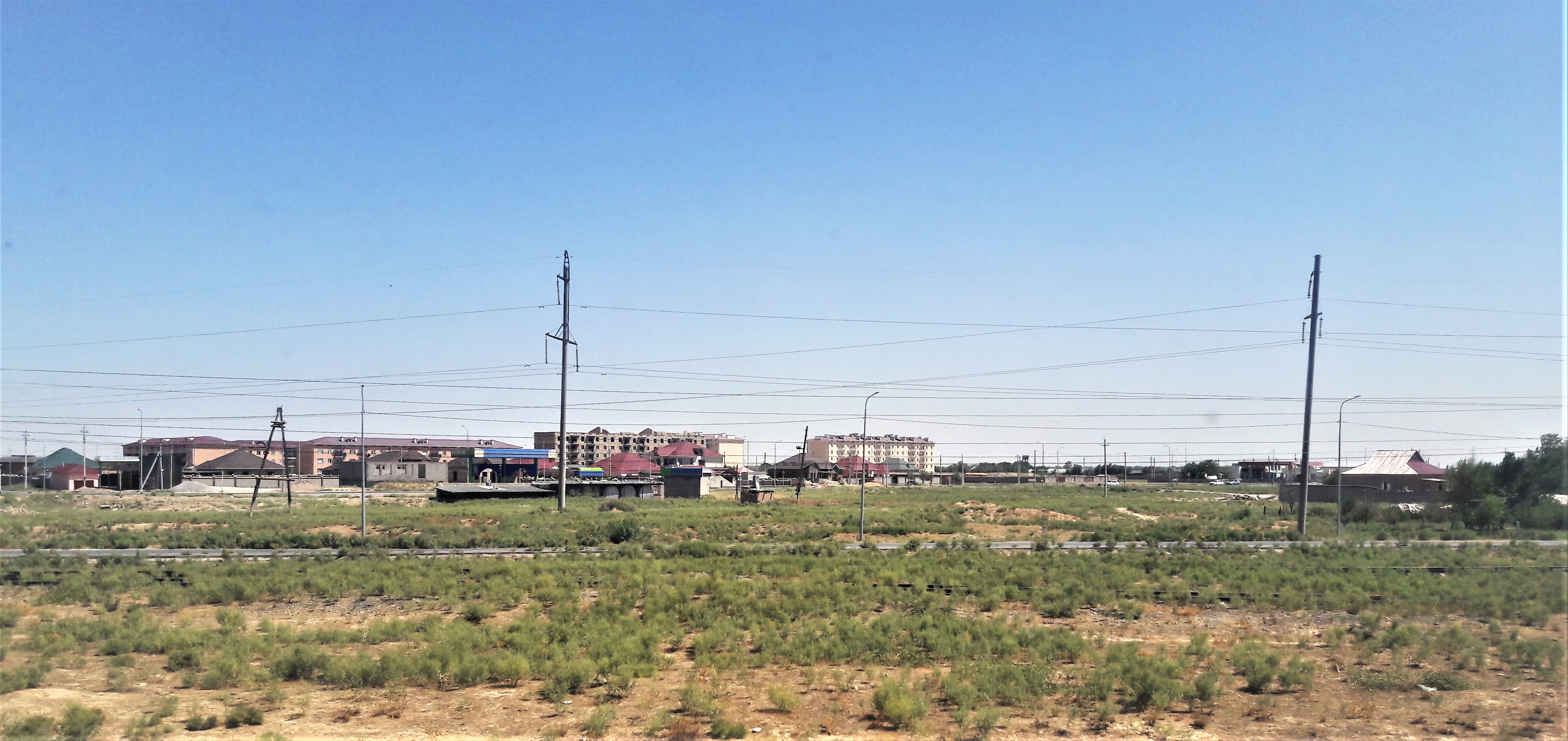
- View of Arys from one of its streets

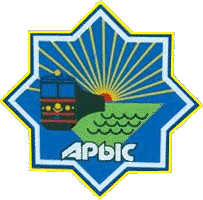
- Seal

- Location within Kazakhstan
- Coordinates: 42°26′0″N 68°48′0″E
- Country: Kazakhstan
- Region: Turkistan Region

Population (2009)
  - Total: 62,197

Arys (Kazakh: Арыс, Arys, ارىس [ɑˈɾəs]; Russian: Арыс, earlier Арысь Aryś), is a town in Turkistan Region of Kazakhstan. Population: 62,197 (2009 census results); 59,280 (1999 census results).

Arys is the junction of two important rail lines: Trans-Aral Railway (Orenburg-Arys-Tashkent) and Turkestan-Siberia Railway (Arys-Almaty-Barnaul). The Arys station was built ca. 1904 on the Trans-Aral line; a number of buildings and structures dating to 1902–1905 are preserved in the city. In 1932 Arys was granted the status of a work settlement, and in 1956, that of a city.

The economy of Arys is centered on agriculture (grain, cotton, livestock). There are some industries as well, mostly having to do with the city's railroad origin: a railroad tie factory, an electric locomotive repair plant, and another one for the repair of railroad cargo cars.

== Climate ==
Climate data for Arys (1991–2020)
Month	Jan	Feb	Mar	Apr	May	Jun	Jul	Aug	Sep	Oct	Nov	Dec	Year
Mean daily maximum °C (°F)	3.1 (37.6)	6.6 (43.9)	15.3 (59.5)	22.6 (72.7)	29.6 (85.3)	35.4 (95.7)	37.5 (99.5)	36.3 (97.3)	30.2 (86.4)	22.0 (71.6)	12.0 (53.6)	4.4 (39.9)	21.2 (70.2)
Daily mean °C (°F)	−2.1 (28.2)	0.4 (32.7)	8.0 (46.4)	15.1 (59.2)	21.5 (70.7)	27.1 (80.8)	29.3 (84.7)	27.5 (81.5)	20.9 (69.6)	12.9 (55.2)	4.9 (40.8)	−1.0 (30.2)	13.7 (56.7)
Mean daily minimum °C (°F)	−6.1 (21.0)	−4.3 (24.3)	2.3 (36.1)	8.2 (46.8)	13.4 (56.1)	18.2 (64.8)	20.3 (68.5)	18.3 (64.9)	11.7 (53.1)	5.3 (41.5)	−0.3 (31.5)	−5.1 (22.8)	6.8 (44.2)
Average precipitation mm (inches)	36.6 (1.44)	41.5 (1.63)	42.0 (1.65)	37.1 (1.46)	26.8 (1.06)	10.6 (0.42)	4.6 (0.18)	2.1 (0.08)	3.2 (0.13)	16.9 (0.67)	34.0 (1.34)	38.6 (1.52)	294 (11.6)
Average precipitation days (≥ 1.0 mm)	7.2	7.2	6.9	5.8	4.7	2.1	0.7	0.6	0.8	3.0	5.5	6.9	51.4
Source: NOAA
