= Viktor Alexandrovich Turin =

Soviet filmmaker (1895–1945)

- Born: 1895; Saint Petersburg
- Died: 15 May 1945; Moscow
- Occupation(s): film director, scenarist
- Notable work: Turksib

Viktor Alexandrovich Turin was a Soviet film director and scenarist. He was born in 1895 in Saint Petersburg and died on 15 May 1945 in Moscow.

== Biography ==
Turin studied at the St. Petersburg Theatre School. In 1912 he went to the United States to study at the Boston Technical Institute. He then worked in Hollywood as an actor and librettist. In 1922 he returned to the Soviet Union and worked as a director. His first feature film, Battle of the Giants (гигантов Борьба), from 1926, was about the class struggle in capitalist society.

== Filmography ==
- Turksib, 1929
