= New Eurasian Land Bridge =

Part of China's Belt and Road Initiative

The New Eurasian Land Bridge, also called the Second or New Eurasian Continental Bridge, is the southern counterpart to the Eurasian Land Bridge and runs through China and Central Asia with possible plans for expansion into South and West Asia. The Eurasian Land Bridge system is important as an overland rail link between China and Europe, with transit between the two via Central Asia and Russia. In the light of the Russian invasion of Ukraine, China halted further investments in the part of the bridge that was planned to go through Russia. After the war began, the Trans-Caspian International Transport Route began to actively develop, which passes through the countries of Central Asia, the Caspian Sea and the countries of the South Caucasus, bypassing Russia.

== Routes ==
Due to a break-of-gauge between standard gauge used in China and the Russian gauge used in the former Soviet Union countries, containers must be physically transferred from Chinese to Kazakh railway cars at Dostyk and Khorgos on the Chinese–Kazakh border and again at the Belarus–Poland border where the standard gauge used in western Europe begins. This is done with truck-mounted cranes. Chinese media often states that the New Eurasian Land/Continental Bridge extends from Lianyungang to Rotterdam, a distance of 11,870 kilometres (7,380 mi). The exact route used to connect the two cities is not always specified in Chinese media reports, but appears to usually refer to the route which passes through Kazakhstan.

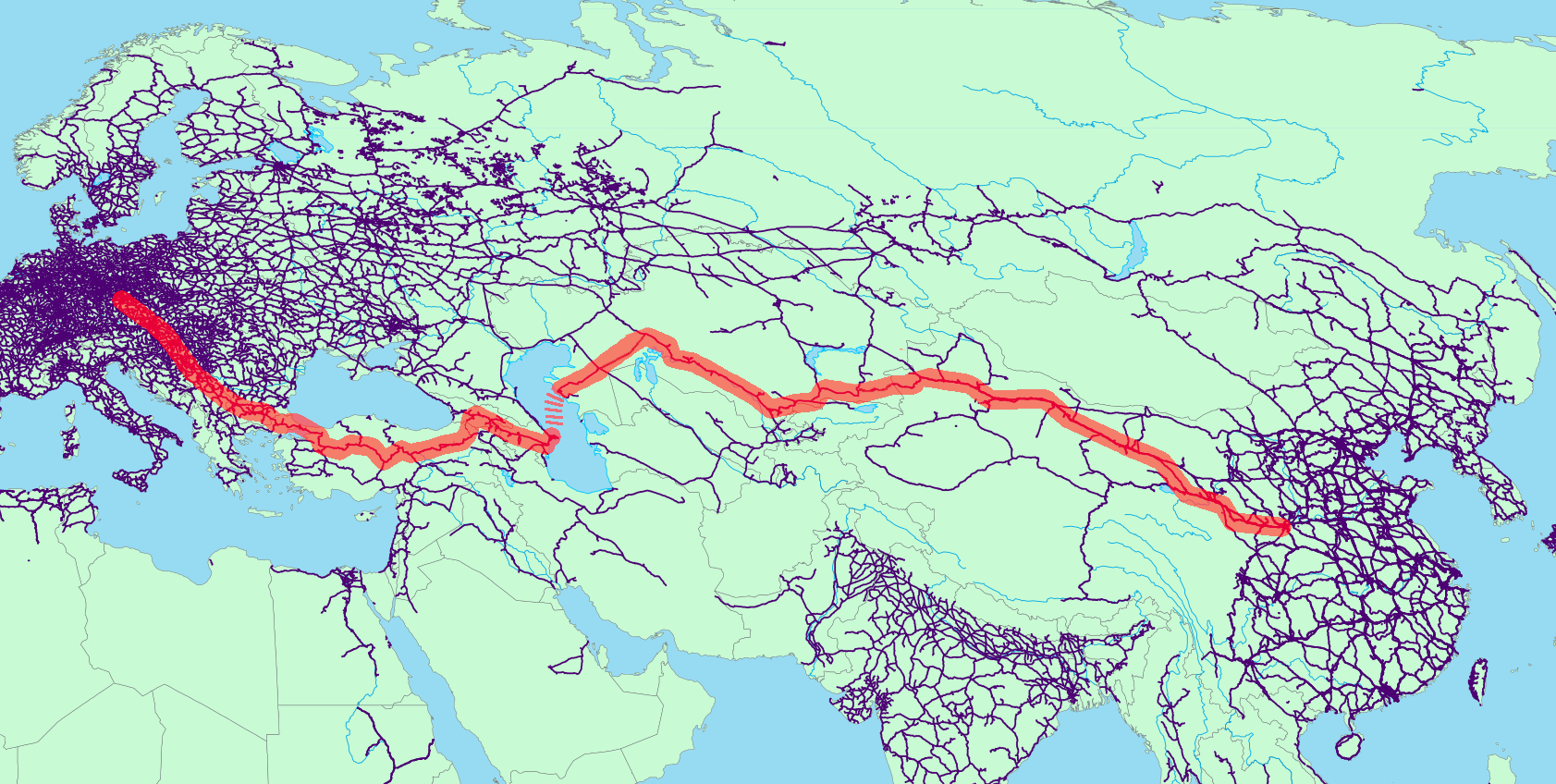
The train route from Xi'an to Prague, bypassing Russia

All rail freight from China across the Eurasian Land Bridge must pass north of the Caspian Sea through Russia at some point. A proposed alternative would pass through Turkey and Bulgaria, but any route south of the Caspian Sea must pass through Iran, although China is (as of 2020) working on the details of the construction of a proposed railway bridge across the Caspian Sea between Azerbaijan and Kazakhstan. A Finnish company has started a route from China via Kazakhstan that crosses the Caspian Sea by ship to Azerbaijan then by rail to Georgia and across the Black Sea to Romania and the rest of Europe. The new route bypasses Russia, Ukraine and Belarus. This route across the Caspian Sea is called Trans-Caspian International Transport Route.

Kazakhstan's President Nursultan Nazarbayev urged Eurasian and Chinese leaders at the 18th Shanghai Cooperation Organisation to construct the Eurasian high-speed railway (EHSRW) following a Beijing-Astana-Moscow-Berlin route.

On 7 November 2019 the first Chinese freight train through the Marmaray tunnel to Europe ran, from Xi'an using a Chinese locomotive. This demonstrated a China-to-Turkey transportation time reduced from a month to 12 days, and is part of the Iron Silk Road.

== Traffic ==
In 2024, the route through Belarus into Poland carried about 90% of all China–EU rail freight. The rail bridge carried about 3.7% of all EU-China trade, with a goods value of about €25 billion (US$27 billion).

== Infrastructure ==
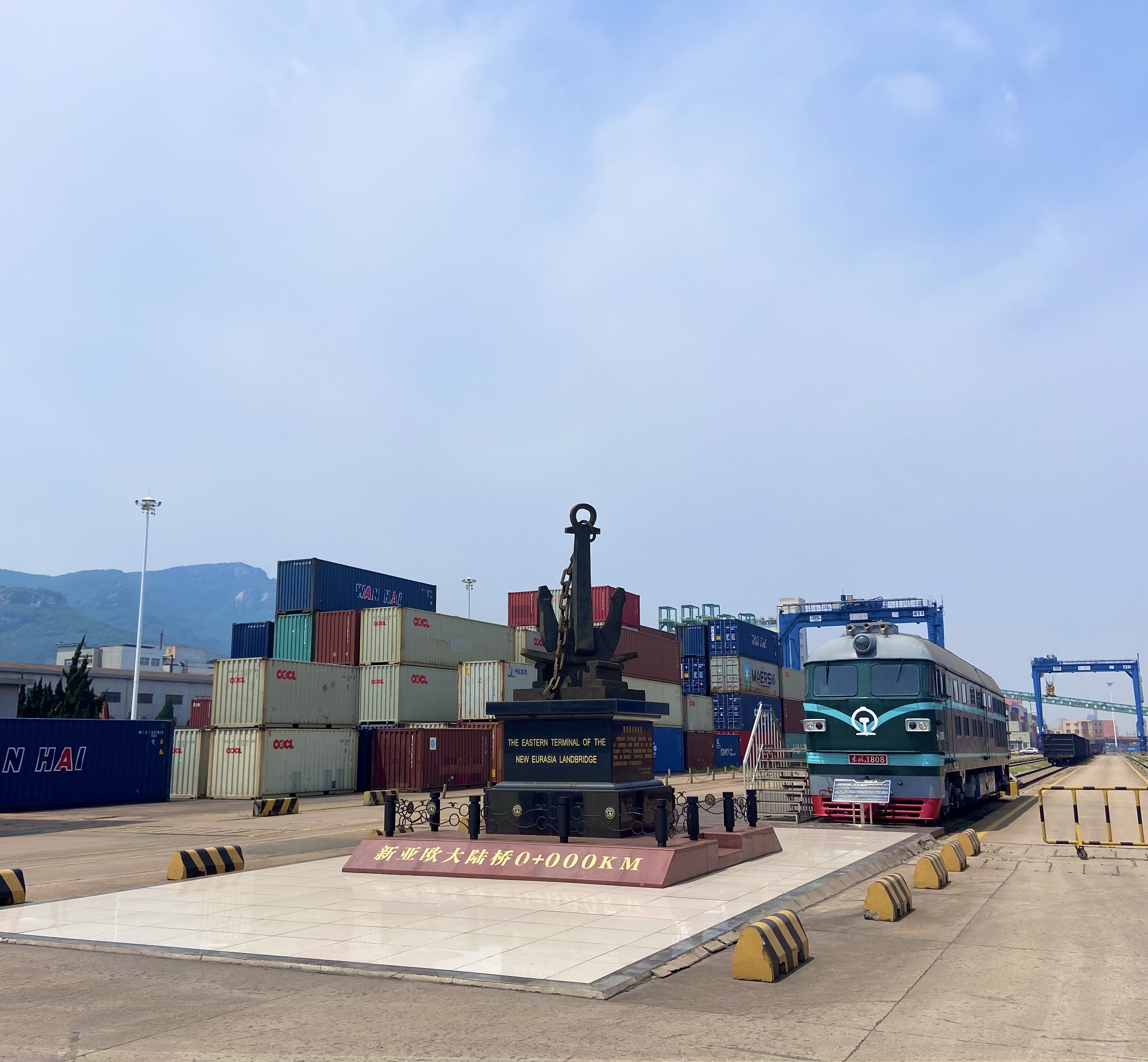
0-km mark of the New Eurasian Land Bridge in the Port of Lianyungang

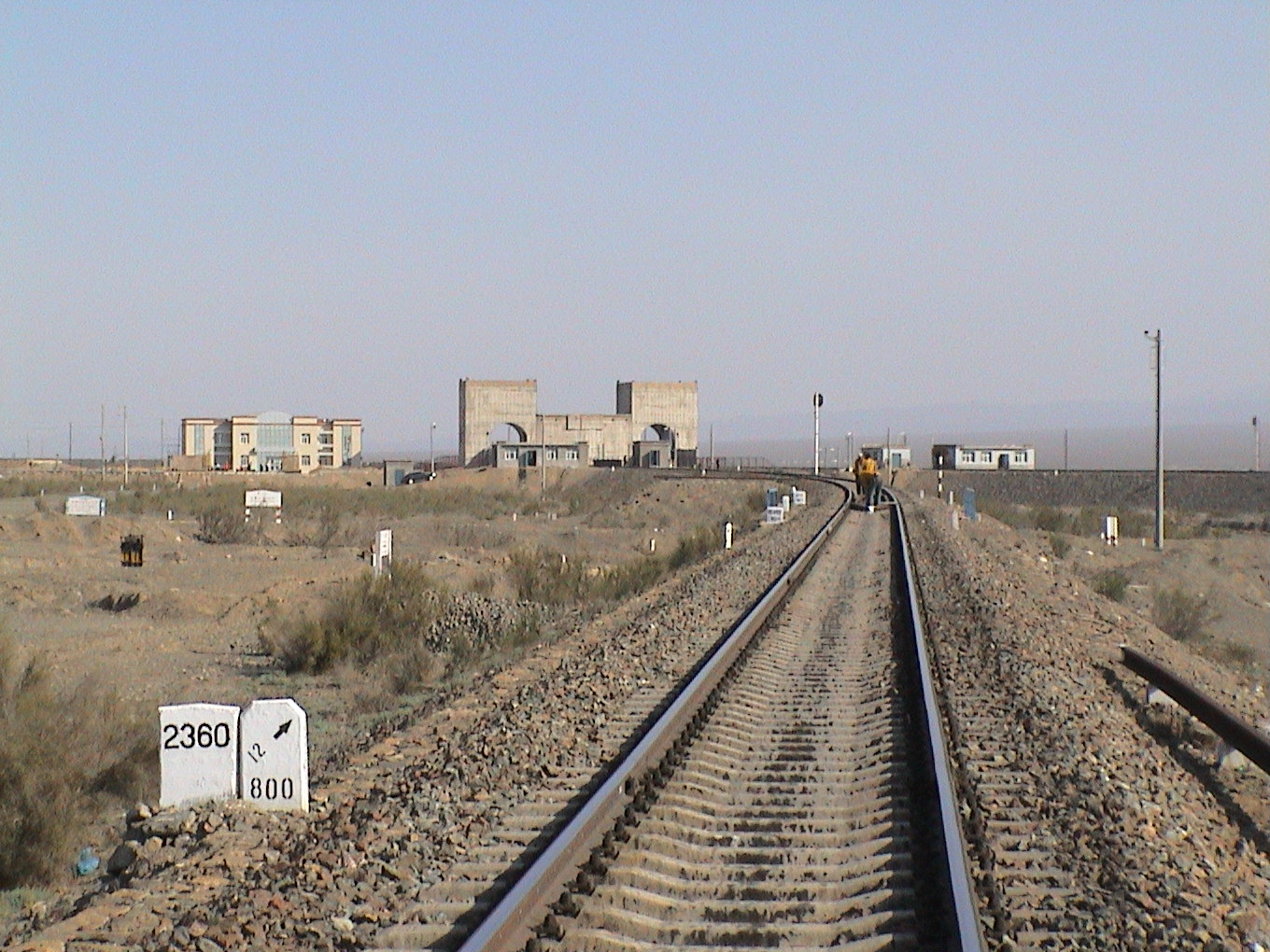
Terminus of the Lanxin railway at Alataw Pass, where the Chinese rail system connects with that of Kazakhstan at Dostyk. From Kazakhstan, rail links extend into Russia.

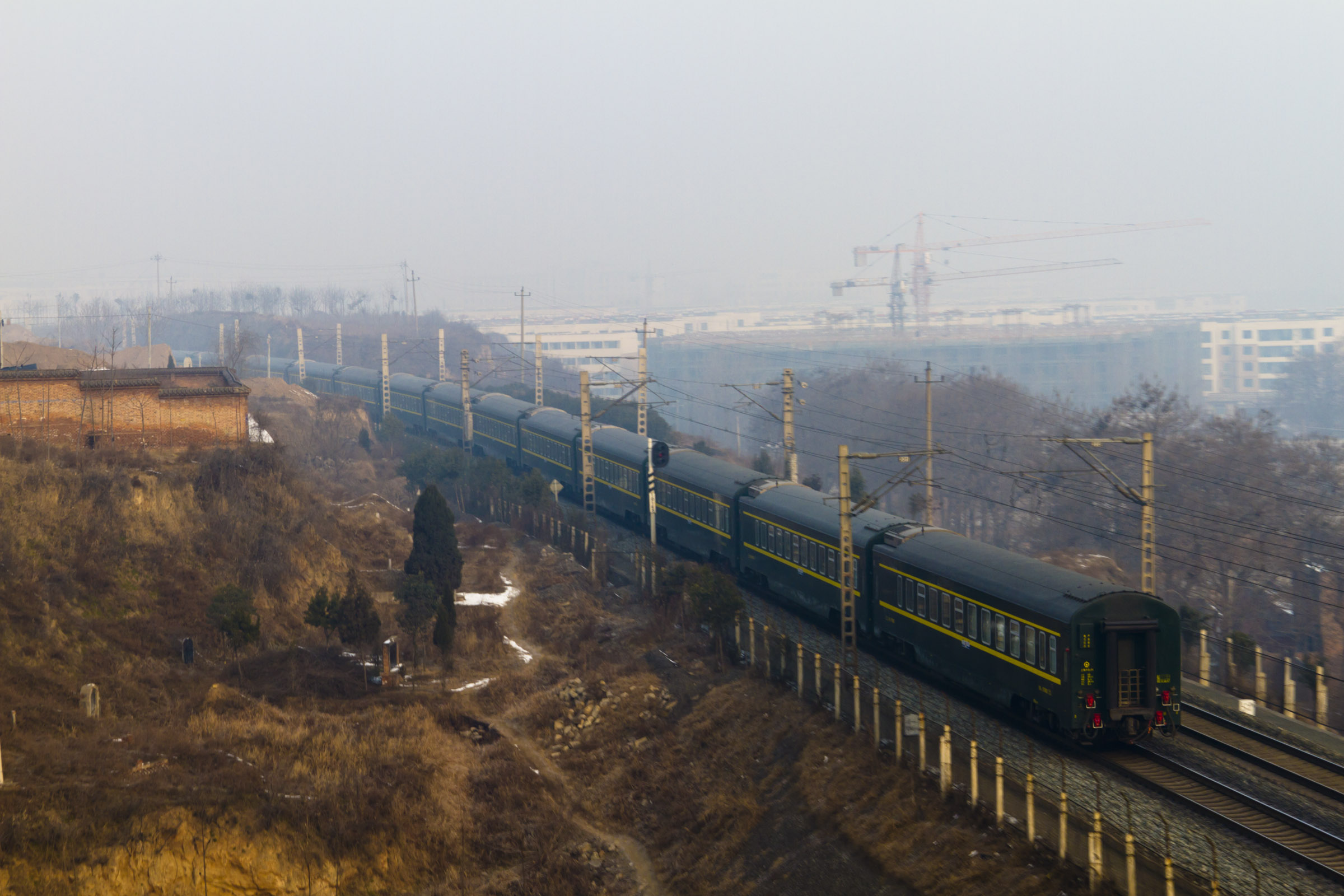
Chinese Railway T165 train near Weinan Station

== See also ==
- Trans-Eurasia Logistics
- Yiwu–Madrid railway line
- Yiwu–London railway line
- North–South Transport Corridor
- Eurasian Land Bridge
- Trans-Caspian International Transport Route

== External links and further reading ==
- Multimedia The New York Times
