= Yiwu–London railway line =

Freight railway route from China to the UK

Overview
- Termini: Yiwu, China; DB Eurohub, Barking, United Kingdom

History
- Opened: 1 January 2017; 9 years ago

Technical
- Track gauge: Primary gauge: 1,435 mm (4 ft 8 1/2 in) standard gauge Kazakhstan-Belarus section: 1,520 mm (4 ft 11 27/32 in) Russian gauge

The Yiwu–London railway line is a freight railway route from Yiwu, China, to London, United Kingdom, covering a distance of roughly 12,000 km (7,500 miles). This makes it the second longest railway freight route in the world after the Yiwu–Madrid railway line, which spans 12,874 km (8,046 miles). It is one of several long-distance freight railway routes from China to Europe on the "New Eurasian Land Bridge" and part of establishing a modern-day Silk Road. The route was opened on 1 January 2017, making London the 15th European city to have a railway route connection with China, and takes 18 days to complete (other European cities with China-Europe railway routes include Hamburg, Madrid, Rotterdam, Warsaw, etc.).

From Yiwu, a trading center 300 km south of Shanghai, the route passes through 9 countries: China, Kazakhstan, Russia, Belarus, Poland, Germany, Belgium, France, UK. In order to get to the UK the route passes through the Channel Tunnel between France and the UK. The London end of the route is located at the DB Eurohub in Barking, East London.

== Break-of-gauge ==
Two breaks of gauge exist on the route: first from standard gauge in China to Russian gauge in Kazakhstan, and second back to standard gauge when crossing from Belarus to Poland. Because of the difference in gauges, trains go through bogie exchange or have containers transloaded to railcars of the correct gauge.

== Travel time ==
Despite the need to go through two bogie exchanges and/or cargo transloading, the trip takes only 18 days to complete. In comparison, it takes a large cargo vessel about 30–45 days of sailing to get from East Asia to Northern Europe.

Trains are run by different companies. To start with, trains depart for London once a week transporting household items, garments, bags and suitcases. The media has perceived the route as a publicity stunt, as household items and clothing do not require the expedited shipping.

The Yiwu–London railway project is part of General Secretary of the Chinese Communist Party Xi Jinping's "One Belt, One Road" policy, which attempts to strengthen the country's trade connections and revive the Silk Road of the past.

== Politics ==
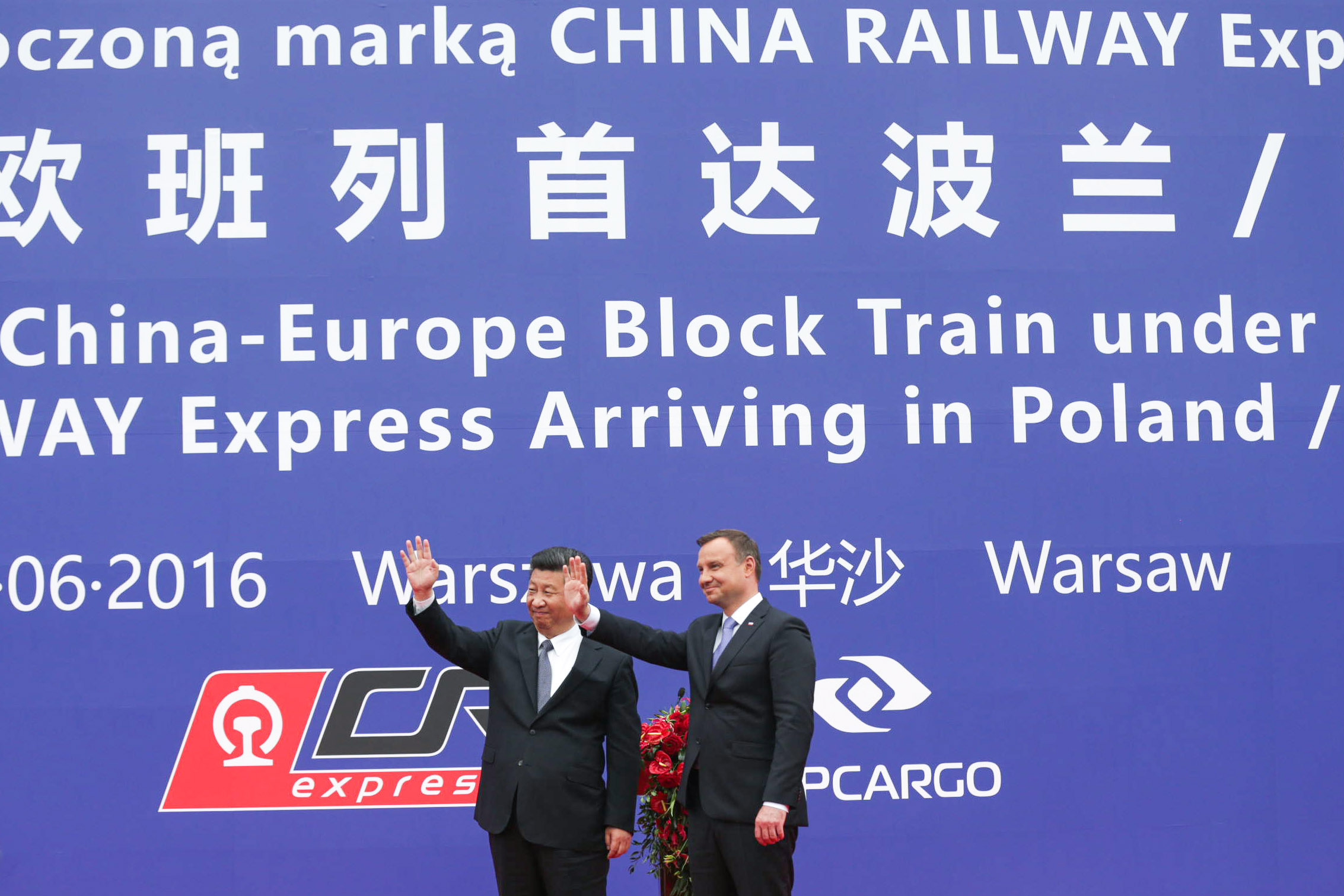
Poland's President Andrzej Duda and China's leader Xi Jinping during the inauguration of the railway line in Warsaw, Poland, 20 June 2016.

While the physical manifestation of and the need for the Silk Road may have eroded over the years due to the collapse of the Safavid Empire and advances in technology, Chinese leader Xi Jinping's "One Belt, One Road" policy has breathed new life into trade of goods by land. The initiative calls for integration of the countries that make up the ancient Silk Road into a robust economic area. The integration will take place through building infrastructure for broadening trade, and increasing cultural exchanges. One Belt, One Road calls for three distinct routes to be established: north, central and south. The north route goes through Central Asia, Russia and then Europe. The central route goes through Central Asia, West Asia, Persian Gulf and the Mediterranean. The south route goes through Southeast Asia and to the Indian Ocean. The Yiwu–London train is part of the north route.

While the Eurasian Land Bridge was completed in 1990, when the railway systems of China and Kazakhstan connected at Alataw Pass, it was first in October 2008 that the first Trans-Eurasia Logistics train reached Hamburg from Xiangtan officially traveling along the entire north route. However, it is only since July 2011 that the railway route has been used for regular transport when a freight route was established between Chongqing, China, and Duisburg, Germany (the Chongqing-Xinjiang-Europe Railway). Since then several other European cities have established railway freight connections with China on the network. London is the latest European city to establish such a freight route when the Yiwu–London route opened in January 2017. It is expected that the importance of the railway trade routes will increase with time, as anticipated cumulative investment over an indefinite timescale for the One Belt, One Road policy is estimated to be between 4 and 8 trillion US dollars.

The Yiwu–London route opened just as Britain was looking outside of Europe to expand its trade, as it is unclear how Brexit will affect UK trade with Europe. British Prime Minister Theresa May triggered Article 50 in March 2017, officially starting the Brexit negotiations. Although total trade between the UK and China increased by £41 billion between 2017 and 2022, it is unknown whether the increase in trade is a direct consequence of the Yiwu–London railway route. Both governments hope that it will help strengthen trade between the two countries, but the service was only scheduled to run once a week for a few months in order to assess demand. If successful, the rail link could be made permanent.

The China-Madrid railway line has experienced success by transporting olive oil back to China and it is expected that in order to become as successful, the China-London route will need to establish a similar export flow. The export flow will most likely consist of British designer goods, providing an opportunity for companies to expand to Chinese markets.

Despite the Russian invasion of Ukraine leading to increased tensions between Russia and the United Kingdom as well as the European Union, which the railway line runs through, services on the Chongqing-Xinjiang-Europe Railway have been able to continue as the Russian authorities have permitted EU-China rail freight to operate without additional restrictions, and so trains have still been able to operate on the Yiwu-London route through into 2024 and beyond.

== See also ==
- Trans-Caspian International Transport Route
