= Yiwu–Madrid railway line =

Railway line from China to Spain

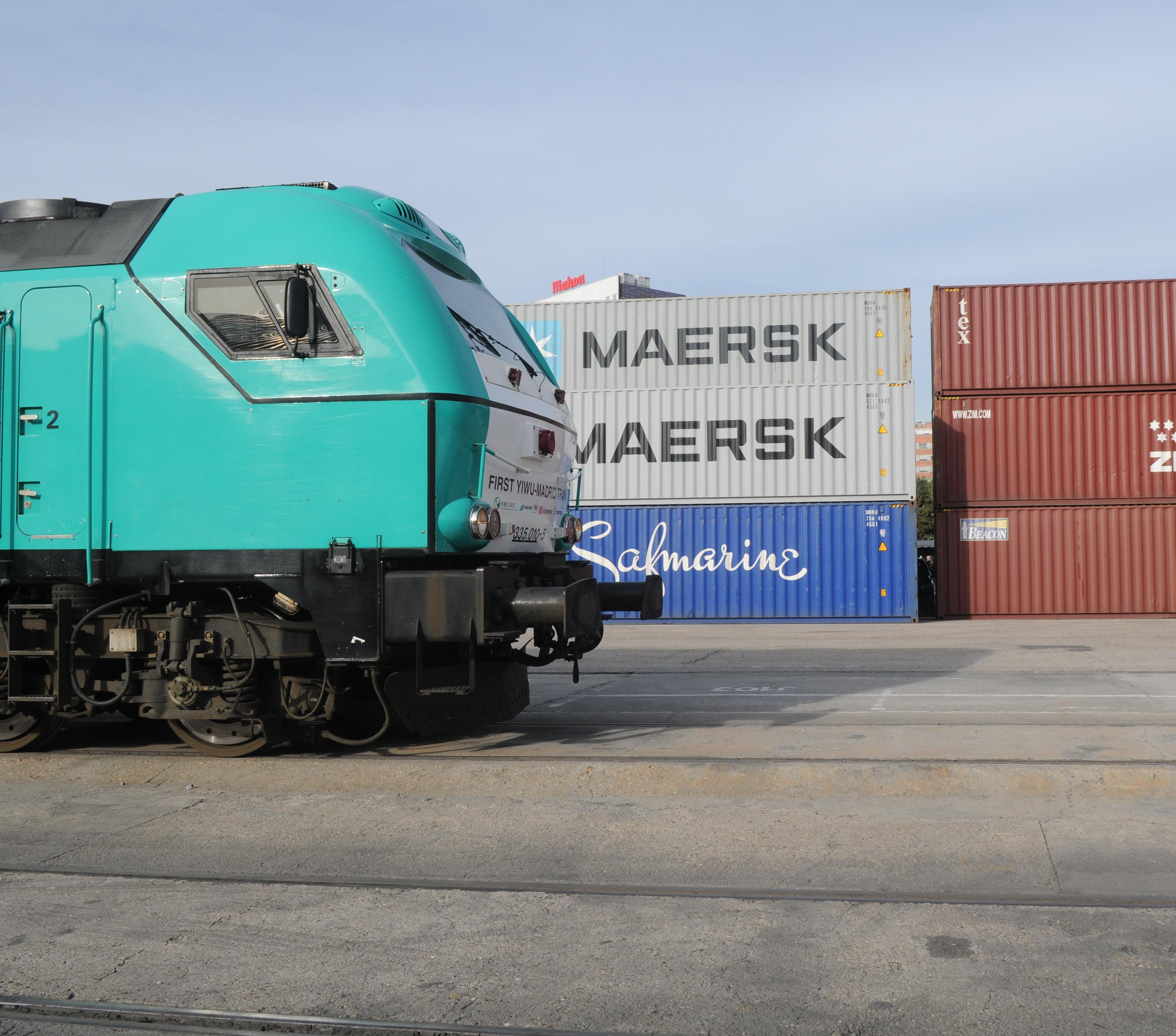
Yiwu–Madrid train in Madrid.

The Yiwu–Madrid railway line is a railway route taken by container trains from the Chinese city of Yiwu to the Spanish city of Madrid, a distance of approximately 13,000 kilometres (8,100 mi), and the longest in the world. The Trans-Siberian Railway was previously the longest. It is one of several routes used by long distance freight trains on the "New Eurasian Land Bridge". (Other city pairs connected by regular freight trains running between China and Europe include e.g. Lianyungang and Rotterdam, or Yiwu and Warsaw; as of 2016, at least 12 Chinese cities and 9 European ones were connected by similar trains.)

From Yiwu, a trading centre 300 kilometres (190 mi) south of Shanghai, the track passes through Kazakhstan, Russia, Belarus, Poland, Germany, and France, terminating at the Spanish capital. China, Poland, and Western Europe have Standard gauge track, while Kazakhstan, Russia, and Belarus use Russian gauge, and Spain has the even wider Iberian gauge. Therefore, trains go through Bogie exchange (or, more likely, have containers reloaded to railcars of a different gauge) at Dostyk, Kazakhstan; Brest, Belarus; and Hendaye, France. The journey takes 21 days. In comparison, a sea journey would take six weeks, and road transport would cause about three times as much pollution (114 tonnes of CO_{2} against 44 tonnes by rail).

The InterRail Group launched this train connection in November 2014, in cooperation with Chinese Railways and Deutsche Bahn (DB). The InterRail Group, registered in Switzerland, is an international transport group with a focus on rail freight, and the owner of rolling stock and containers.

Trains are run by different companies, which are a joint venture between the German Deutsche Bahn AG and Russian Railways (RZhD). Typical goods include computers and vehicle parts.

The international project follows Chinese Communist Party general secretary Xi Jinping’s promise to establish an "economic belt" along the historic Silk Road and Russian President Vladimir Putin’s call for "a new wave of industrialisation across the Eurasian continent."

== See also ==
- Chongqing–Xinjiang–Europe railway
- Yiwu–London railway line
- Trans-Caspian International Transport Route
- Baikal–Amur Mainline
- Eurasian Land Bridge
- Silk Road Economic Belt
