= Land bridge (disambiguation) =

A land bridge is a connection between two otherwise unconnected areas of land.

Land bridge may also refer to:

- Land bridge (rail), the transport of containers by rail between ports on either side of a land mass
- Land bridges in air rights, covering transportation facilities with bridges for non-transportation uses
- Natural arch, a geological feature
