= Land bridge (rail) =

Transportation infrastructure

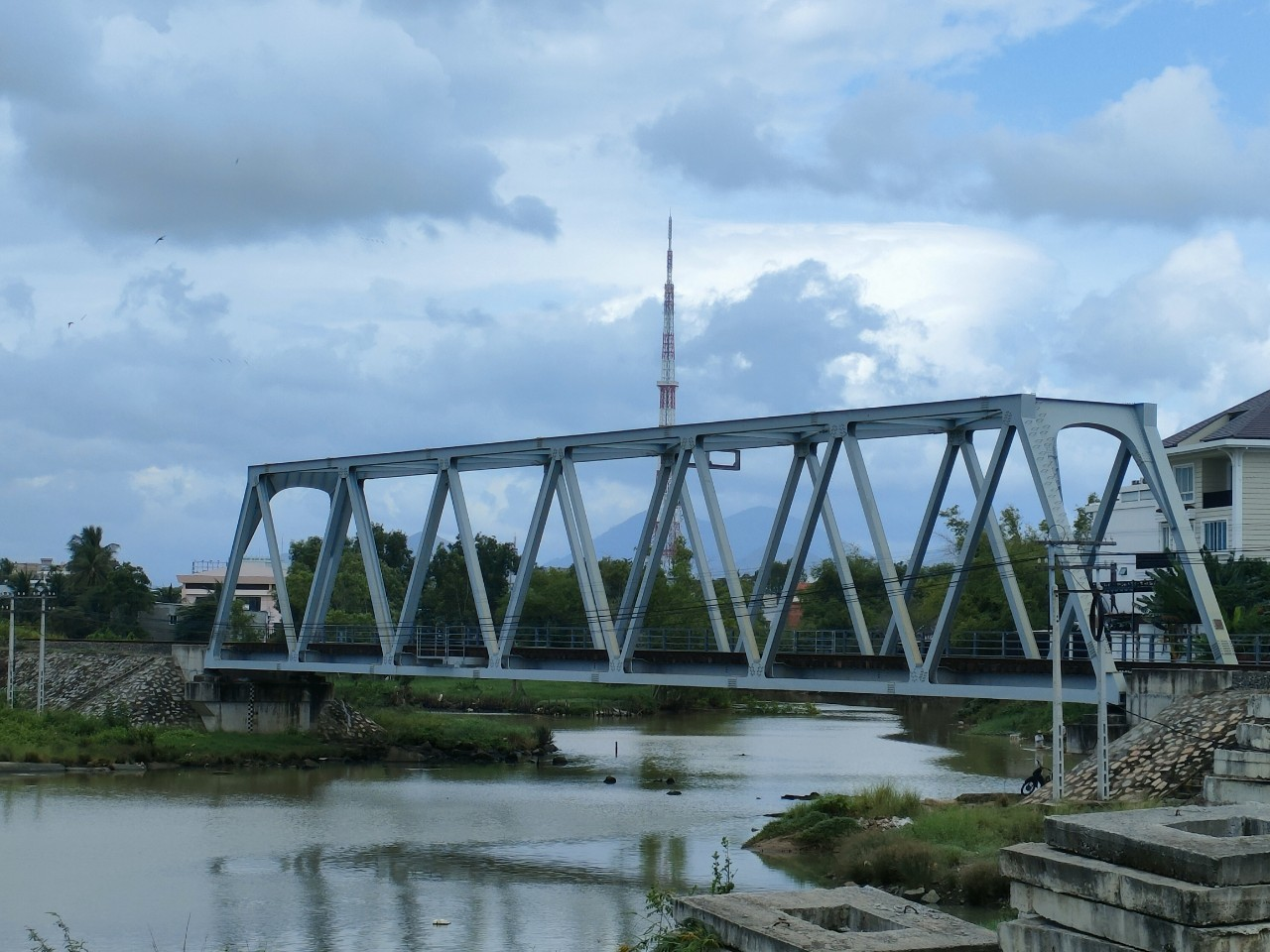
A railway bridge in Nha Trang on North - South railway of Vietnam

A rail land bridge is a route allowing the transport of containers by rail between ports on either side of a land mass, such as North America. Jean-Paul Rodrigue defined a rail land bridge as having two characteristics: First, a single bill of lading issued by the freight forwarder that covers the entire journey, and second, the freight remains in the same container for the total transit. One example of a rail land bridge is the Eurasian Land Bridge. A transcontinental railroad can be a type of land bridge.
