= Northern East West Freight Corridor =

Proposed rail project

The Northern East West Freight Corridor (N.E.W. Corridor), is a project organized by the International Union of Railways UIC and Transportutvikling AS to connect the East Coast of the United States to East Asia by rail and maritime routes.

== Route ==
Suggested train and ship routes

The route begins at eastern ports of North America, such as Halifax Harbour. From there, ships travel across the Atlantic Ocean to the port of Narvik, and containers are transported, primarily by rail, to Sweden, Finland, and Russia, through a route often called the Eurasian Land Bridge. From Russia it splits into two routes: the Trans-Siberian Railway to Vostochny Port, or though Kazakhstan to Ürümqi. From Ürümqi, containers are transported to Lanzhou and occasionally to Lianyungang.

== History ==
The project was financed for a test run in 2006 through N.E.W Corridor AS, a company 65% owned by UIC and 35% owned by a Norwegian county, Nordland.

As of 2020, no containers were transferred from ships to trains in Narvik. However, eastbound transport of fish and westbound transport of mixed goods between Narvik and Chongqing began in 2020. This was done via Helsinki, extending the established rail connection between Helsinki and Chongqing.

== Benefits ==
Transportutvikling, a Norwegian transport company, claimed in a 2011 report that the N.E.W corridor would be an important alternative to the traditional shipping route from China to the US, because:

- Shorter travel routes than alternatives through central Europe.
- Reduced transit time, due to faster land transport and shorter distance.
- Inland Chinese cities would benefit as they are already reliant on rail.
- Congested ports are avoided.
- Ports and railway systems are already in place, they just need to become more efficient.
- Narvik is ice-free all year, with a railway connection to Russia through Sweden and Finland.
- This route avoids the six bottlenecks of global shipping: the Panama Canal, the Suez Canal, the Straits of Gibraltar, the Bosporus, the Straits of Hormuz and the Straits of Malacca, through which passes 60% of all shipping.
- It serves as a backup to current major transport routes.

== Challenges ==
Issues with the transport corridor span technical, financial, and political.

=== Technical ===
Technical issues:

- The track gauges differs, as Russia and Kazakhstan use 1,520 mm (4 ft 11 27/32 in) Russian gauge, Finland uses 1,524 mm (5 ft), while China, Sweden and Norway use 1,435 mm (4 ft 8 1/2 in) standard gauge. This break of gauge adds costs at border crossings.
- Increasing train speeds, as the Trans-Siberian Railway is currently increasing service speed to 55 kilometres per hour.
- Increasing the limited port capacity in Narvik for China–US trade.
- Reducing round trip time for customers by increasing speed and frequency, which requires a high volume of goods.
- Lackluster railway capacity, as there is not enough capacity for 45 more trains per day along the Iron Ore Line. There are suggestions to build a Skibotn–Kolari line for this traffic and mining products from the Kolari region.

=== Political ===
Political issues:

- Bureaucratic procedures at border crossings are inefficient, and problematic, adding several journey days.
- N.E.W passes through politically unstable countries - Russia is ranked 121st in the Index of Economic Freedom, while China and Kazakhstan are ranked 111 and 113 respectively.
- Railway track is vulnerable to crashes and terrorism. The Trans-Siberian Railway is long and difficult to protect.

=== Financial ===
Financial issues:

- A high frequency of train departures must be maintained, which may exceed demand.
- Established transport methods, such as shipping over the Pacific Ocean and using container trains in the US or using the Panama Canal may have lower costs.
- Trains between interior China and interior Europe have low market shares, even if the rates are competitive.
