= Chongqing–Xinjiang–Europe railway =

Railway line from China to Germany

The Chongqing–Xinjiang–Europe railway, abbreviated as Yu–Xin–Ou railway (Chinese: 渝新欧铁路; pinyin: Yú–Xīn–Ōu tiělù), is a freight rail route linking Chongqing in Southwestern China, with Duisburg, Germany. The abbreviation consists of Yu (渝) for Chongqing, Xin (新) for Xinjiang, and Ou (欧) for Europe.

It passes through the Dzungarian Gate into Kazakhstan, and moves through Russia, Belarus and Poland before arriving in Duisburg. The railway is part of a growing rail network connecting China and Europe along the New Silk Road.

== Background ==
According to the European Commission, as of March 2014, the EU is China's biggest trading partner. Rail transport is becoming increasingly important for trade between Europe and China as the latter promotes industrial hubs in cities further inland in its territory.

== Route in China ==
- Chongqing
- Chengdu
- Xi'an
- Lanzhou
- Ürümqi

== Operators ==
The Yuxinou train is operated by YUXINOU (Chongqing) Logistics Co., Ltd, a joint venture between RZD Logistika JSC, Russia, the YUXINOU (Chongqing) Supply Chain Management Co., Ltd. and the China Railways International Multimodal Transport Company Ltd. (CRIMT), both from the People's Republic of China, the Kazakhstan Temir Zholy, the national railway company of Kazakhstan, and the DB Schenker China Ltd, a subsidiary of Deutsche Bahn.

== Customers and usage ==
Most goods transported via this route are from multinational IT companies in Chongqing. One of these is technological giant Foxconn who supplies Hewlett-Packard, Acer Inc. and Apple Inc.

== Statistics ==
The 11,179 km route takes 13 to 16 days to reach Duisburg from Chongqing, compared to the 36-day container ship transport time as well as being safer and less expensive, according to Chongqing authorities.

From January to November, 2012, a total of 40 freight trains ran on the Yuxinou Railway, transporting 1747 containers with 21,000 tons cargo, and worth of 1.15 billion USD. The freight included 3.062 million laptops and 564,000 liquid crystal display screens.

In 2018, around 30 trains ran every week, 10 times more than in 2014.

== See also ==
- Silk Road
- Chinese trade#Trading partners
- China–European Union relations#Trade
- Transiberian Railway
- Yiwu–Madrid railway line
- Yiwu–London railway line
