= Trans-Eurasia Logistics =

Freight train service from China

- Simplified Chinese: 中欧班列
- Traditional Chinese: 中歐班列
- Literal meaning: China-European scheduled trains
Transcriptions
Standard Mandarin
- Hanyu Pinyin: Zhōng Oū Bān Liè

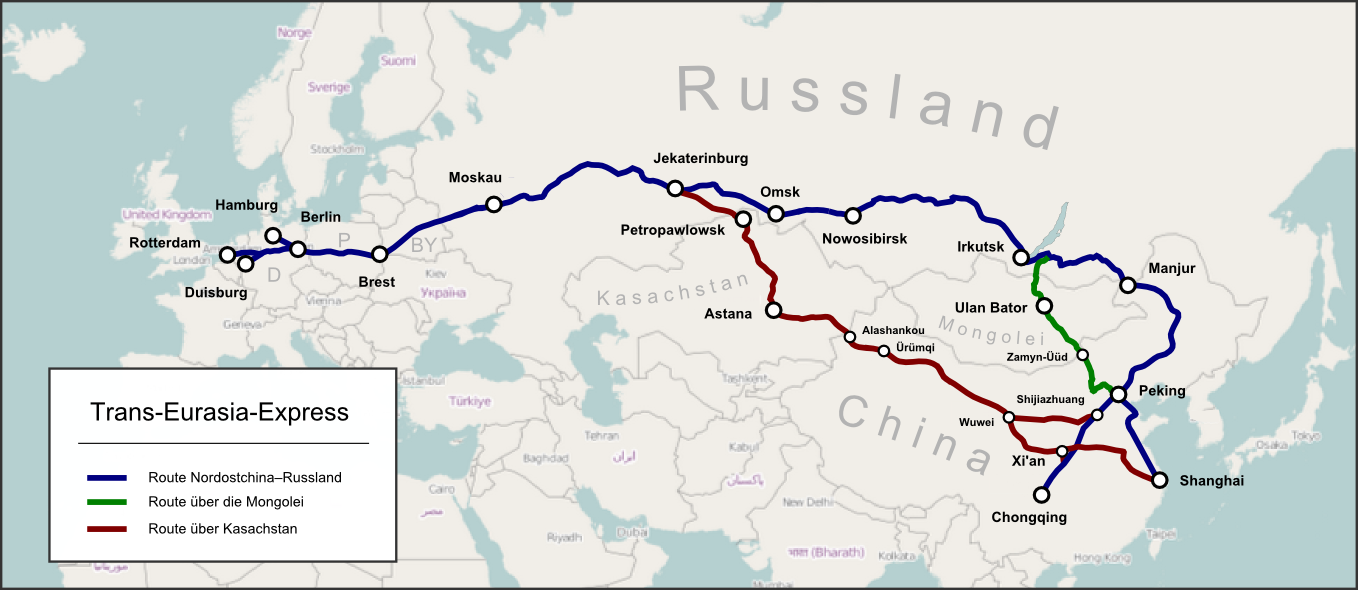
Trans-Eurasia Logistics

Trans-Eurasia Logistics, AKA CHINA RAILWAY Express, is a joint venture between German rail company Deutsche Bahn and Russian RZhD, China Railway Corporation from China operating container freight trains between Germany and China via Russia. The first such train arrived in Hamburg from Xiangtan on 6 October 2008, taking 17 days to make the trip. Intermodal companies Polzug, Kombiverkehr, and TransContainer are also involved in the project. Since the end of 2020, up to 60 trains per week run between Shenzhen and Duisburg (Rhine harbour).

Container trains travel from China to Germany via the Trans-Mongolian and Trans-Siberian Railways, and then via Belarus and Poland - the route collectively known as the "Eurasian Land Bridge". A break of gauge needs to be crossed when entering Mongolia from China (or Russia directly from China, if traveling via Manzhouli/Zabaykalsk), and then another one when leaving Belarus for Poland.

Trans-Eurasia Logistics operates the Yiwu-Madrid Railway line, which is the longest goods railway line in the world and connects China, Kazakhstan, Russia, Belarus, Poland, Germany, France and Spain.

== Locomotives Being Used ==
=== China ===
DF4 (Diesel)

DF4D (Diesel)

DF7C (Diesel)

HXN5 (Diesel)

HXN3B (Diesel)

SS3B (Electric)

HXD1(Electric)

HXD2 (Electric)

=== Mongolia ===
M62 (Diesel)

=== Kazakhstan ===
VL80 (Electric)

KZ8A (Electric)

=== Russia ===
VL80 (Electric)

=== Europe ===
Belarus: BCG-1 (Electric)

Poland & Germany: ES64F4 (Electric)

Austria: ER20 (Diesel)

== See also ==
- AH1
