= Jean-Paul Rodrigue =

Canadian geographer (born 1967)

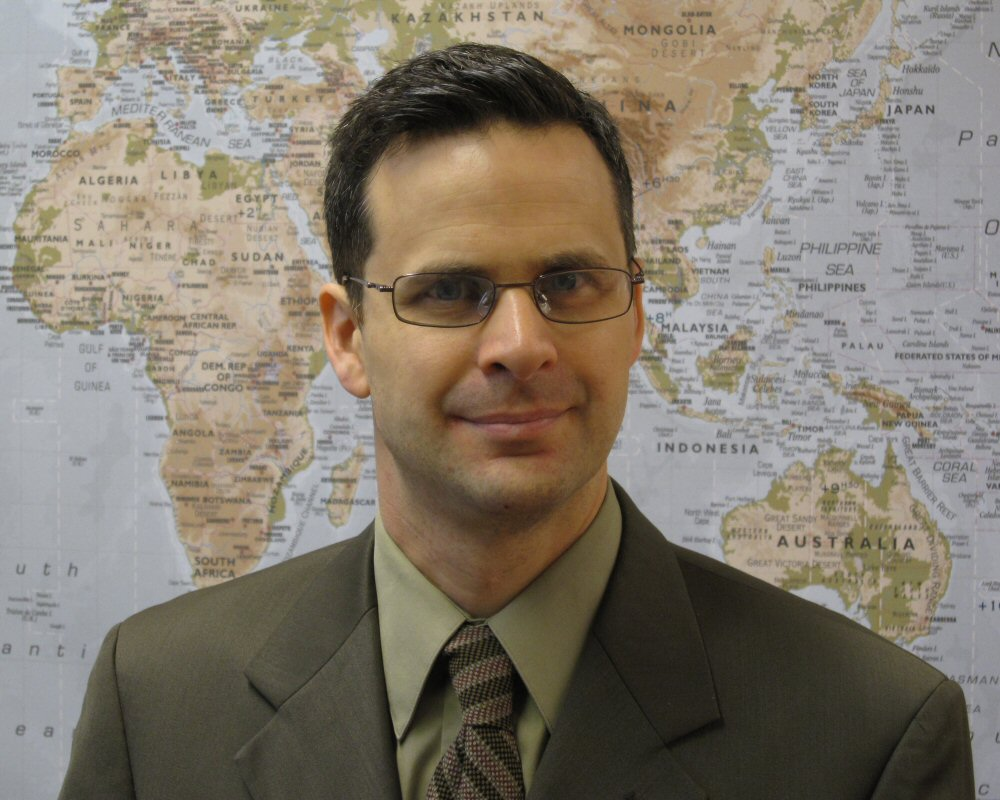
- Born: July 20, 1967 (age 59); Montreal, Quebec, Canada
- Education: Université de Montréal
- Occupations: Transportation geographer, author, professor
- Employer: Texas A&M University

Jean-Paul Rodrigue (born July 20, 1967) is a Canadian-born scholar of transportation geography and college professor.

== Biography ==
Rodrigue has a PhD in transport geography from the Université de Montréal (1994) and has been part of the Department of Maritime Business Administration at Texas A&M University in Galveston since 2024. Between 1999 and 2023, he was part of the Department of Global Studies and Geography at Hofstra University in Hempstead, New York. His work, L'espace économique mondial: les économies avancées et la mondialisation, (The Global Economic Space: Advanced Economies and Globalization) won the PricewaterhouseCoopers "Best Business Book" award in 2000. In 2019, the American Association of Geographers granted Rodrigue the Edward L. Ullman Award for outstanding contribution to the field of transport geography.

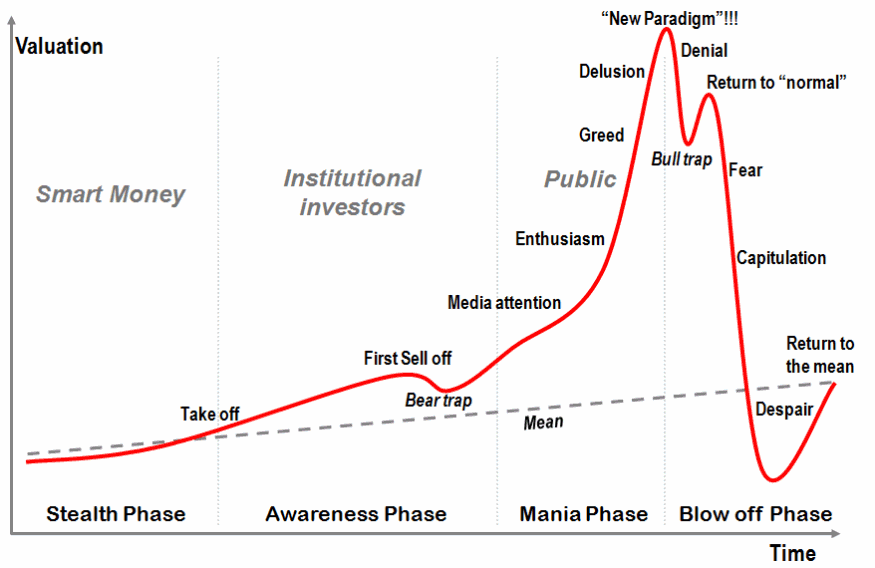
Rodrigue's "phases of a bubble" chart

In 2008, Rodrigue achieved notability with his model of economic bubbles, charting four phases of a bubble. While the "smart money" has purchased during the earlier "stealth phase", institutional investors begin to buy during "take off". Following media coverage, the general public begins to invest leading to steep rise in prices as "enthusiasm" and then "greed" kick in. "Delusion" precedes the peak.

The chart was widely syndicated during the 2008 financial crisis.

== Publications ==
- Notteboom, Th.; Pallis, A.; Rodrigue, J-P. (2022). Port Economics, Management and Policy. New York: Routledge. doi:10.4324/9780429318184. ISBN 978-0-367-33155-9. S2CID 245460569.
- Rodrigue, J-P (2020). The Geography of Transport Systems (5th ed.). New York: Routledge. doi:10.4324/9780429346323. ISBN 978-0-367-36463-2. S2CID 241532721.
- Rodrigue, J-P; Notteboom, Th.; Shaw, J. (2013). The SAGE Handbook of Transport Studies. London: SAGE Publishing. ISBN 9781849207898.
- Rodrigue, J-P; Comtois, C.; Slack, B. (2009). The Geography of Transport Systems (2nd ed.). London: Routledge. ISBN 978-0-415-48324-7.
- Rodrigue, J-P (2000). L'espace économique mondial: les économies avancées et la mondialisation [The Global Economic Space: Advanced Economies and Globalization]. Sainte Foy: Université du Québec. ISBN 2-7605-1037-9.
