= Eurasian Land Bridge =

Rail route between East Asia and Europe

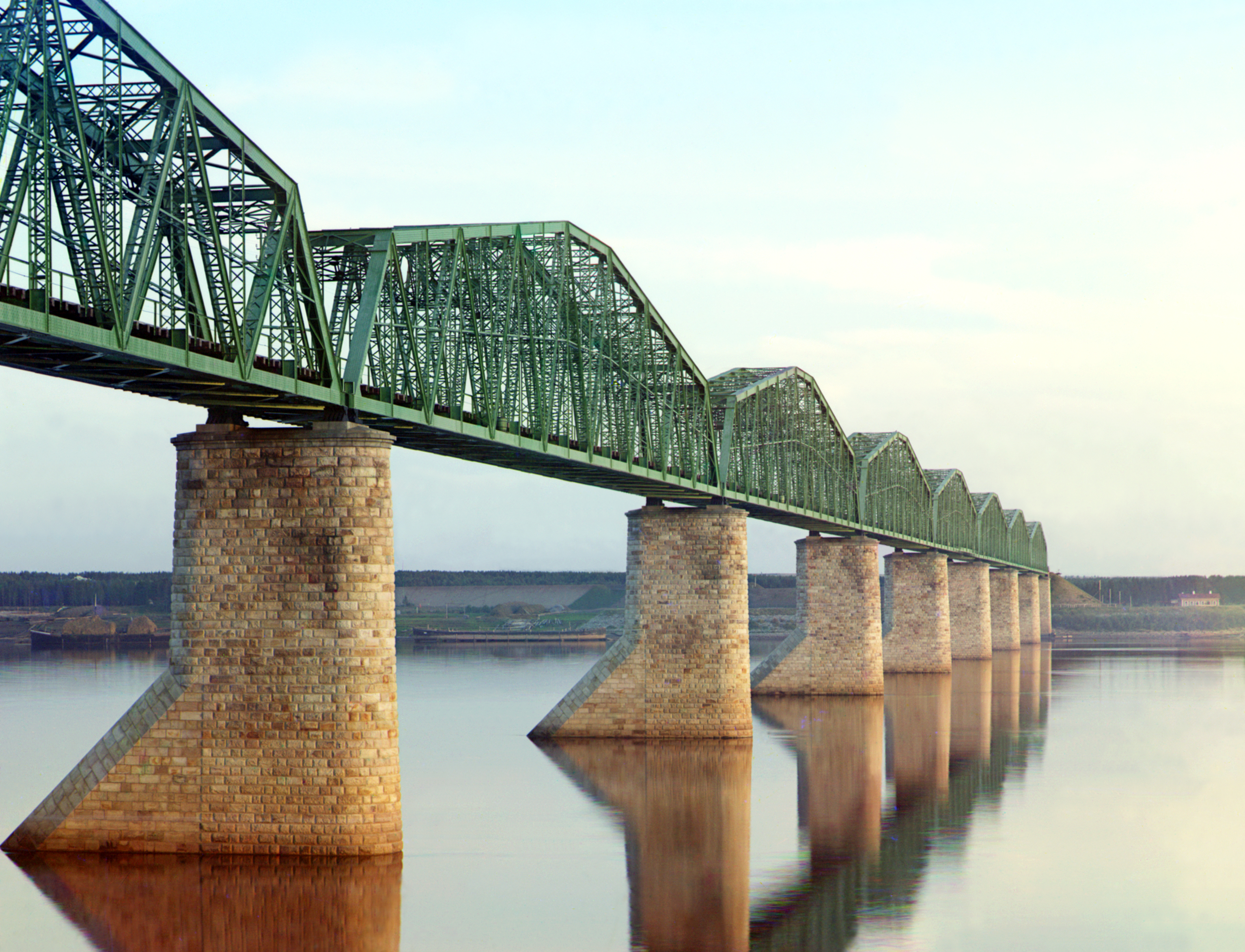
Railway bridge on the Trans-Siberian across the Kama River near Perm, c. 1910

The Eurasian Land Bridge (Russian: Евразийский сухопутный мост, romanized: Yevraziyskiy sukhoputniy most), sometimes called the New Silk Road (Новый шёлковый путь, Noviy shyolkoviy put'), is the rail transport route for moving freight and passengers overland between Pacific seaports in the Russian Far East and China and seaports in Europe. The route, a transcontinental railroad and rail land bridge, comprises the Trans-Siberian Railway, which runs through Russia and is sometimes called the Northern East-West Corridor, and the New Eurasian Land Bridge or Second Eurasian Continental Bridge, running through China and Kazakhstan. As of November 2007, about one percent of the $600 billion in goods shipped from Asia to Europe each year were delivered by inland transport routes.

Completed in 1916, the Trans-Siberian connects Moscow with Russian Pacific seaports such as Vladivostok. From the 1960s until the early 1990s the railway served as the primary land bridge between Asia and Europe, until several factors caused the use of the railway for transcontinental freight to dwindle. One factor is use of a wider rail gauge by the railways of the former Russian Empire and Soviet Union than most of the rest of Europe and China.

China's rail system had long linked to the Trans-Siberian via northeastern China and Mongolia. In 1990, China added a link between its rail system and the Trans-Siberian via Kazakhstan. China calls its uninterrupted rail link between the port city of Lianyungang and Kazakhstan the New Eurasian Land Bridge or Second Eurasian Continental Bridge. In addition to Kazakhstan, the railways connect with other countries in Central Asia and the Middle East, including Iran. With the October 2013 completion of the rail link across the Bosphorus under the Marmaray project, the New Eurasian Land Bridge now theoretically connects to Europe via Central and South Asia.

Proposed expansion of the Eurasian Land Bridge includes construction of a railway across Kazakhstan that is the same gauge as Chinese and European railways (standard gauge, as opposed to 1,520 mm gauge in the former Russian Empire and the Soviet Union), rail links to India, Myanmar, Thailand, Malaysia and elsewhere in Southeast Asia, construction of a rail tunnel and highway bridge across the Bering Strait to connect the Trans-Siberian to the North American rail system, and construction of a rail tunnel between South Korea and Japan. The United Nations has proposed further expansion of the Eurasian Land Bridge, including the Trans-Asian Railway project.

== History ==
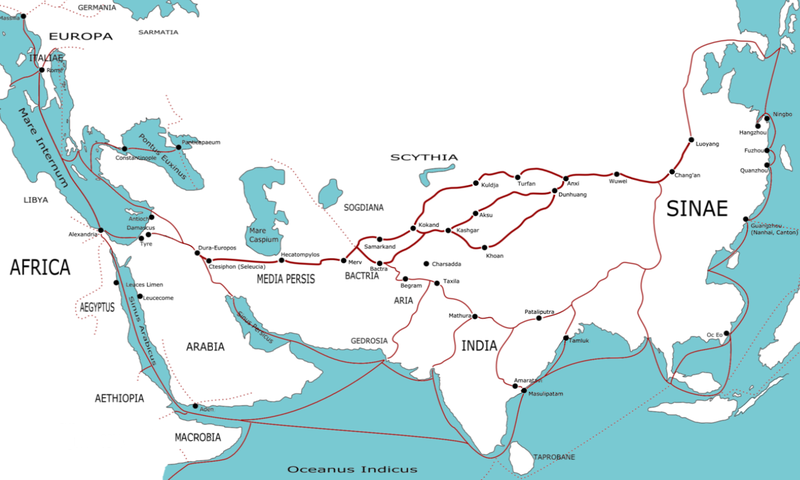
Silk Road trading routes during the 1st century AD

Commercial traffic between Europe and Asia took place along the Silk Road from at least the 2nd millennium BC. The Silk Road was not a specific thoroughfare, but a general route used by traders to travel, much of it by land, between the two continents along the Eurasian Steppes through Central Asia. The 8,000-kilometre-long (5,000 mi) route was used to exchange goods, ideas and people primarily between China and India and the Mediterranean and helped create a single-world system of trade between the civilisations of Europe and Asia.

Exports from Asia transported along the Silk Road included fabrics, carpets, furs, weapons, utensils, metals, farm produce, livestock and slaves. Civilisations active in trading during the road's history included Scythia, Ancient and Byzantine Greece, the Han and Tang dynasties, Parthia, Rouran, Sogdiana, Göktürks, Xiongnu, Yuezhi and the Mongol Empire.

Beginning in the 5th century AD, new land routes between Asia and Europe developed further to the north. Many of these routes passed through Yugra and extended to the Baltic region. The Khazars, Volga Bulgaria, and the Rus' Khaganate were active in trading along the northern trade routes.

Traffic along the southern Silk Road routes greatly diminished with the fall of Constantinople in the 15th century and development of the sea route around the Cape of Good Hope in the 16th century. By the 18th century, European influence on trade and new national boundaries severely restricted the movement of traders along all land routes between Europe and China, and overland trade between East Asia and Europe virtually disappeared.

== Trans-Siberian Railway ==
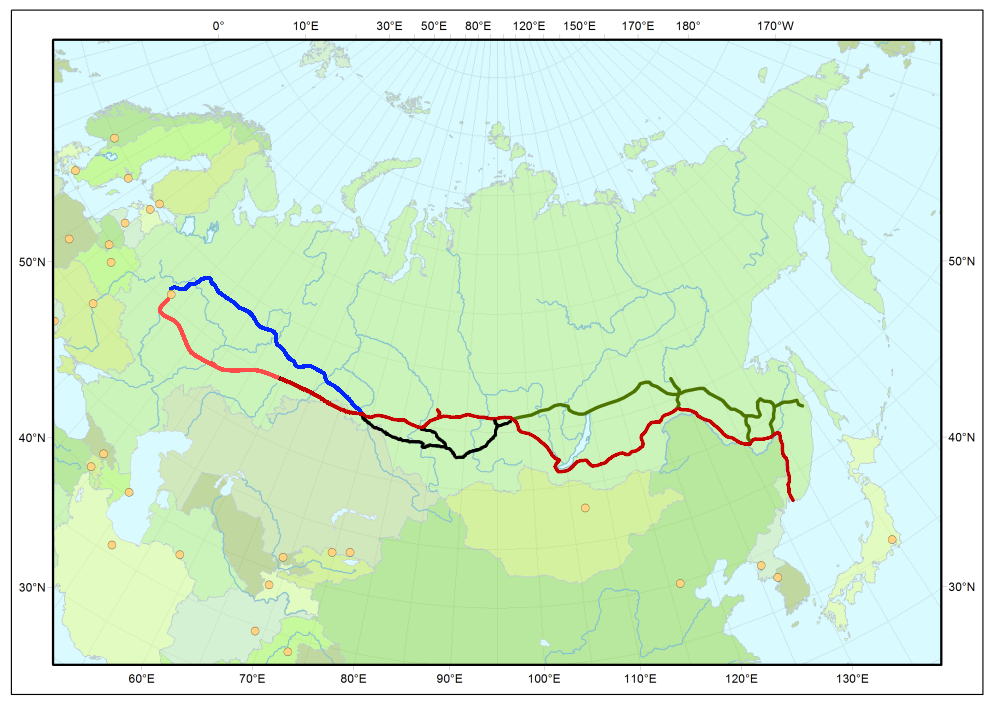
Map of the Trans-Siberian (red) and Baikal–Amur Mainline (green) Railways

The Trans-Siberian Railway and its various associated branches and supporting lines, completed in 1916, established the first rail connection between Europe and Asia, from Moscow to Vladivostok. The line, at 9,200 kilometres (5,720 mi), is the longest rail line in the world.

The Trans-Siberian connects the Russian Pacific ports of Vladivostok and Nakhodka with Moscow. Rail links at Moscow allow passengers and freight to connect to train lines running further west into Europe. By making further transfers, passengers and freight can eventually reach Western European seaports. The Trans-Siberian also connects with North Korea (e.g. via Dandong in Northeastern China, or directly at Khasan south of Vladivostok).

A fully electrified and double-tracked line, the Trans-Siberian Railway line is capable of transporting around 100 million tons of freight annually. The line can handle up to 200,000 TEU of containerized international transit freight per year.

A more northerly east–west route across Siberia, parallel to the Trans-Siberian line and known as the Baikal–Amur Mainline, was mostly completed in 1989. It terminates at the Pacific ports of Vanino and Sovetskaya Gavan. Although this line is comparatively little used (the management mentions 6 million tons of freight per year, not indicating the year), the management expects the line to be fully used in the foreseeable future for oil and copper ore exports, and has plans to double-track it.

While the Trans-Siberian has always been used by the Tsarist, Soviet and modern Russian governments to project political power into their territories in Asia, in the 1960s it was opened by the USSR as an international trade route connecting the Western Pacific with Europe. But there were increasing problems with freight shipments on the line, with dilapidated rail infrastructures, theft, damaged freight, late trains, inflated freight fees, uncertain scheduling of return of containers, and geopolitical tension. Thus by the 1990s, use of the railway for international trade had almost ceased.

According to Hofstra University, as of 2001 there was renewed interest in using the Trans-Siberian as a route across Asia to Europe. Also, the Trans-Siberian links directly to railways which ultimately connect, via Finland and Sweden, to the year-round ice-free port of Narvik in Norway. At Narvik, freight can be transshipped to ships to cross the Atlantic to North America. Rail links from Russia also connect to Rotterdam, but may encounter greater congestion and delays along this route. The trade route between the east coast of North America and eastern Russia using the Trans-Siberian is often called the Northern East West Freight Corridor.

In an effort to attract use of the Trans-Siberian to transport goods from Japan, China, and Korea to Europe, in the mid-1990s Russia lowered tariffs on freight using the railway. As a result, freight volume over the rail line doubled in 1999 and 2000.

In February and March 2011, Japan's Ministry of Land, Infrastructure, Transport and Tourism sponsored a test of the route by shipping roof tiles to Europe via the Trans-Siberian. The tiles were transported by ship from Hamada, Shimane to Vladivostok, then by the railway to Moscow. The transit time was expected to be 30 days, in comparison with the 50 days on average it takes for cargo to travel by ship from Hamada to ports in western Russia. If successful, the ministry would use the results of the test to encourage other Japanese companies to use the Trans-Siberian over the sea route.

In 2011, a daily direct container rail service began carrying car parts 11,000 kilometres (6,800 mi) from Leipzig, Germany, to inland Shenyang, China, through Siberia in 23 days.

In 2013 a direct container, pallet, and general cargo rail service began, 10,000 kilometres (6,200 mi) from Łódź, Poland, to inland Chengdu, China, through Siberia in 14 days, 3 days each week.

According to Russian statistics, the amount of international container shipments transiting annually through Russia over the Trans-Siberian grew by a factor of 7 between 2009 and 2014, reaching 131,000 TEU (55,000 physical containers) in 2014.

Belarusian Railways reported similar statistics: in 2014, the volume of direct container traffic from China to Western Europe crossing Belarus amounted to 40,600 TEU, on 25 direct container train routes. This constituted over 20% of Belarusian Railway's entire volume of container transportation that year, 193,100 TEU. This was still much less than 0.1% of the number of containers that travel via China's sea ports (some 170 million TEU).

== China and the land bridge ==
=== Direct connections between Russia and China ===
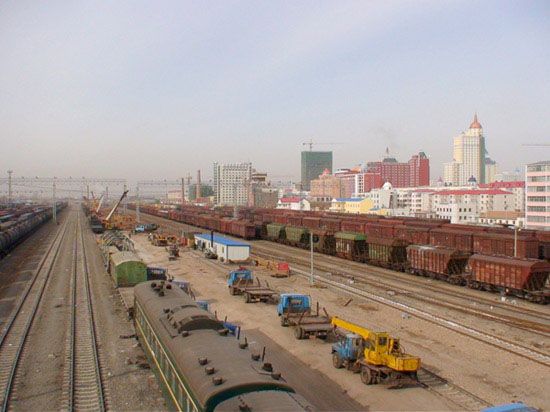
Manzhouli, China's oldest and busiest rail gate to Russia

The original Moscow–Vladivostok route, completed in 1904, cut across China's northeastern provinces, or Manchuria; the section of the railway located within China was known as the Chinese Eastern Railway. While the more northerly Trans-Siberian route, located entirely on Russian soil, was completed in 1916, the former Chinese Eastern Railway route continues as an important connector between the two countries' railway networks.

The western border point (Zabaykalsk/Manzhouli) and the line connecting it to the Trans-Siberian main line, are now being upgraded, with the goal of enabling the railway by 2010 to pass 30 freight trains in each direction across the border, each one up to 71 cars long. The cross-border freight volume at this rail crossing is expected to reach 25.5 million tons by 2010.

Besides cargo (principally, Russian oil exported to China), this crossing sees a direct weekly passenger train, Moscow–Beijing, as well as some local passenger trains. The eastern border point of the former Chinese Eastern Railway, at Suifenhe/Grodekovo, sees significant use as well, with over 8 million tons of freight crossing the border there in 2007, and regular cross-border passenger service.

A third, little-known and less used, rail connection between Russia and China was built farther south, between Hunchun (in China's Jilin province) and Russian Makhalino (a station on the Ussuriysk–Khasan–North Korean border line, 41 km (25 mi) before Khasan). It began operating in February 2000, and saw only a minor amount of traffic (678 railcars of lumber) over the next two years. The line was closed in 2002–03, briefly reopened in 2003, and closed again in September 2004. On 15 February 2011, the two companies who own the line, Northeast Asia Railway Group, a Chinese company, and JSC Golden Link, a Russian company, signed an agreement to resume operations on the line in May 2011.

In November 2008, the transport ministries of Russia and the China signed an agreement about creating one more link between the railway systems of the two countries. It will involve a railway bridge between across the Amur (Heilong) River, connecting Tongjiang in China's Heilongjiang province with Nizhneleninskoye in Russia's Jewish Autonomous Oblast. On 4 November 2010, the project director, Wang Jin, told Xinhua News Agency that construction on the bridge would begin in January 2011.

=== Russia to China via Mongolia ===
The Trans-Mongolian line, connecting Ulan-Ude on the Trans-Siberian with China's Erenhot via the Mongolian capital Ulaanbaatar, both serves as a crucial link to the outside world for landlocked Mongolia, and the shortest connection between the Trans-Siberian Railway and Beijing. This line's capacity, however, is limited by its being single-track.

=== Kazakhstan to China ===
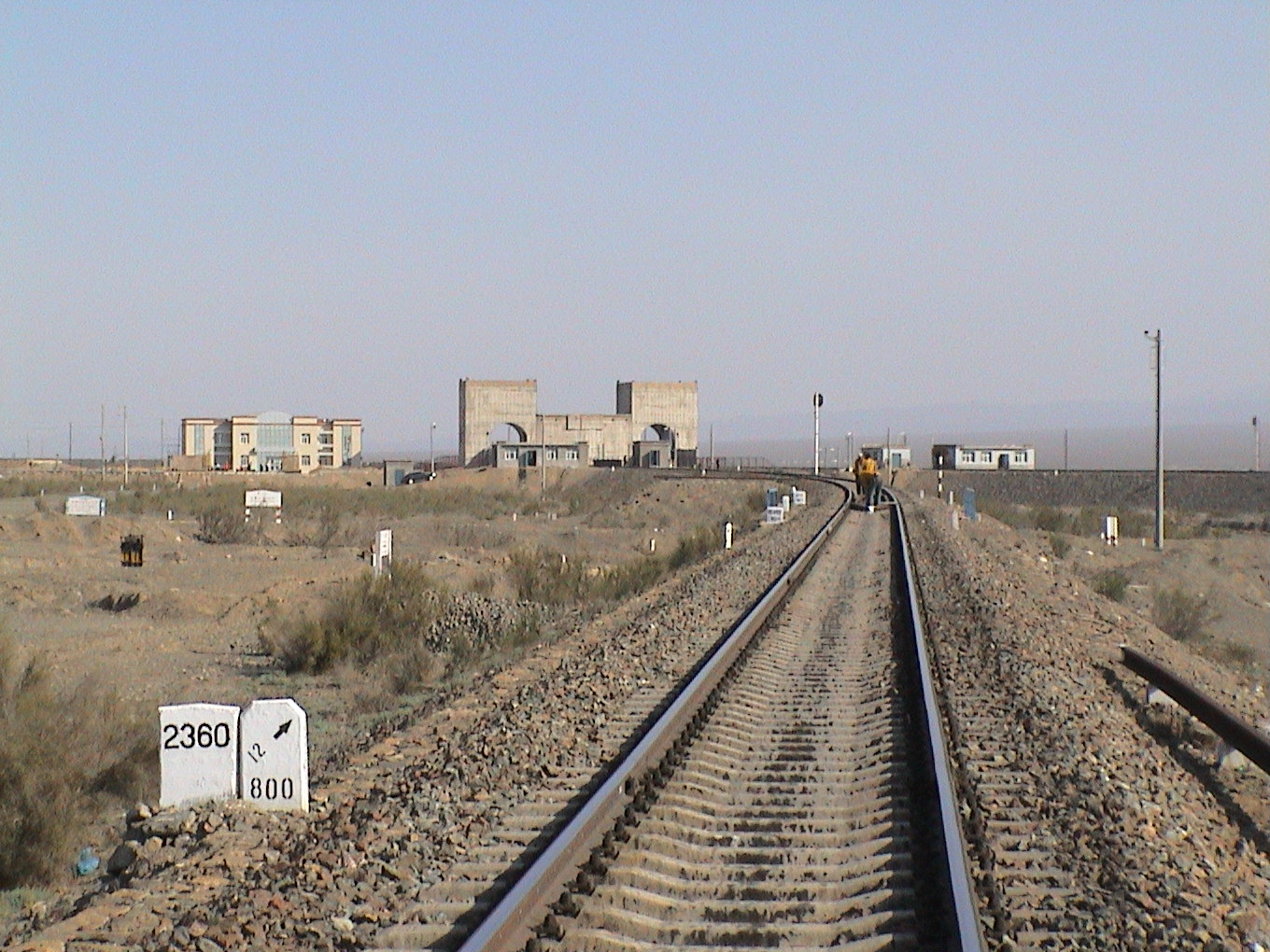
Terminus of the Lanxin railway at Alataw Pass where the Chinese rail system connects with that of Kazakhstan at Dostyk.

While the USSR had long been connected with China via the rail links in Northeastern China and Mongolia, since the 1950s plans existed to connect the two countries' rail networks at the Kazakhstan/Xinjiang border. The Soviets completed their line from Aktogay (a station on the Turksib in eastern Kazakhstan) to their border station Druzhba (now Dostyk), but the construction on the Chinese side stopped because of the Sino-Soviet split of the 1960s. In 1985 construction commenced on the Northern Xinjiang Railway to link the Chinese and Russian rail networks via Kazakhstan. The section between Ürümqi and Alashankou was completed on 16 September 1990, linking the railway lines of the two countries at Dostyk. In July 1991 the first goods train traveled along the line from China to Kazakhstan's then-capital of Almaty. In December 2009, a second rail link from China was built to the Kazakhstan border at Khorgos. The Jinghe–Yining–Khorgos Railway forks off of the Northern Xinjiang Railway at Jinghe and approaches Kazakhstan from the Ili River Valley. A rail link on Kazakh side will extend the line to Saryozek by 2013. The rail link through the Korgas Pass was completed in December 2012.

Because Kazakhstan was once in the Russian Empire and then a member of the USSR, its rail system connects with and carries the same rail gauge as the Russian rail system, as well as the other Central Asian republics of Turkmenistan, Uzbekistan, Kyrgyzstan and Tajikistan.

From Kazakhstan, four major north–south railways connect with the Russian rail system. Two connect with the Trans-Siberian Railway (the Turksib and the Shu–Nur-Sultan–Petropavl meridional line) while the other two (the Trans-Aral Railway, and the connection via Atyrau and Astrakhan Oblast) go directly to European Russia. These links to the Russian rail system are sometimes called the Eurasian Railway. Kazakhstan plays an important role in the "New Silk Road" initiative, known as "One Belt, One Road" linking China and Europe through Central Asia and Russia.

A new direction of the Silk Road was launched in January 2016 and included the Ukraine – Georgia – Azerbaijan – Kazakhstan – China route.

Kazakhstan's infrastructure development program Nurly Zhol was developed in line with the New Silk Road Initiative. President of Kazakhstan Nursultan Nazarbayev even noted that Nurly zhol was a part of the New Silk Road Economic Belt.

=== Through service between China and Western Europe ===
There are three main routes for container services from China to Europe: Eastern route from Vostochny Port (Russia), northern route from west China via Manzhouli/Zabaikalsk border stations and southern route from east China via Dostyk border station, through which totally 25k TEU has been transported on rail by 2014.

In January 2008 China and Germany inaugurated a long-distance freight train service between Beijing and Hamburg. Travelling a total of 10,000 kilometres (6,210 mi), the train uses the China Railways and the Trans-Mongolian line to travel from Xiangtan (in Hunan Province) to Ulaanbaatar, where it then continues north to the Trans-Siberian. After reaching the end of the Trans-Siberian at Moscow the train continues to Germany via rail links in Belarus and Poland. Total transit time is 15 days, as compared with the 30 days average it would take for the freight to make the same journey by ship. The first train of 50 containers, carrying a mixed load of clothes, ceramics and electronics (for the Fujitsu company), travelled on tracks operated by six different railways.

Hartmut Mehdorn, chairman of Deutsche Bahn (DB), stated in March 2008 that regularly scheduled, weekly China-Germany freight services should be in operation by 2010. In April 2009, however, DB postponed the service indefinitely because of the global economic crisis.

Another test run, from Chongqing to Duisburg via Alashankou crossing, Kazakhstan, Russia, Belarus, and Poland took place in March–April 2011, covering 10,300 km (6,400 mi) in 16 days. It was again said by DB that if there is enough demand, the service can be made regular already in 2011, As of March 2014, the Chongqing-Duisburg route makes three weekly services carrying up to 50 forty-foot-long containers.

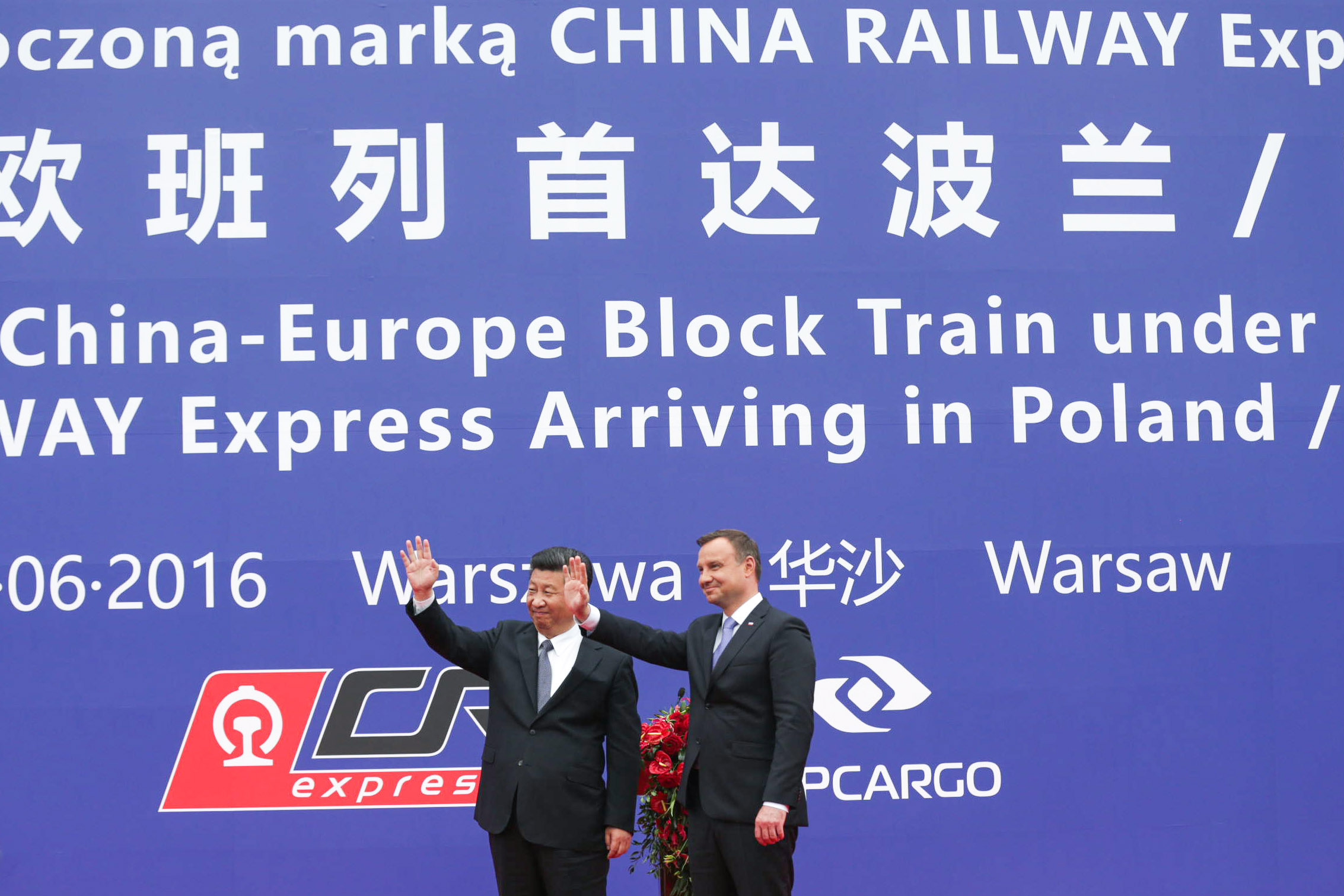
China's paramount leader Xi Jinping and Poland's President Andrzej Duda during the inauguration of the China Railway Express in Warsaw, Poland

The transportation authorities in another industrial center of central China, Wuhan, plan to organize regular runs of direct freight train between Wuhan and European destinations (Czech Republic, Poland, Germany) starting in April 2014. Plans call for the service starting from 1–2 trains per month in April–June 2014, gradually increasing the frequency to 1–2 trains per week in 2015. A new customs facility is under construction in Wuhan's Wujiashan (吴家山) industrial area; after its planned opening in October 2015, exports from the Wuhan region will be able to clear Chinese customs there, instead of Alashankou.

By 2016, the freight rail service between a number of container terminals in China and their counterparts in Europe has become fairly regular. Between some city pairs, there is one train per week.

Both with respect to cost and speed, the China-Europe direct train service is in between the air and sea options. While it is estimated that the overall volume of goods moving between China and Europe by rail is not going to surpass 1–2% of the sea cargo volume, it may eat significantly into the air cargo volume.

The service is typically used for valuable and somewhat time-sensitive cargo where the time advantage of rail over ship is essential, which, however, is heavy enough to make the cost saving vs. air transport noticeable. Typical cargoes include complex machinery and spare parts (in both directions), as well as high-end groceries and consumer goods (primarily toward China). While major customers ship their products by full container load, freight forwarders also make it possible to send less-than-container shipments.

On the European end of the freight route, the rail terminal near Duisburg's river port (Ruhrort) is a major destination. According to a 2018 report, Duisburg is either the destination, or one of the destinations, of some 80% of all direct China-Western Europe cargo trains.

=== New Eurasian Land Bridge ===
The New Eurasian Land Bridge, also called the New Eurasian Continental Bridge, is the name given to China's rail link with Central Asia. The route includes China's east–west railways which, in addition to the Beijiang line, are the Longhai Railway and the Lanzhou–Xinjiang Railway. Together, the railways create an uninterrupted rail link between the port city of Lianyungang in Jiangsu province and Kazakhstan. In 1995 the Chinese and Kazakhstan governments signed an agreement which allows the latter to use Lianyungang as its primary seaport for exports and imports, and the former intends for Lianyungang to serve as the designated starting point for the New Eurasian Land Bridge.

From Almaty in Kazakhstan, the railway extends to Tashkent and Samarkand, Uzbekistan and then to Tejen, Turkmenistan. From Tejen, another line continues to Ashgabat, the capital of Turkmenistan. After Ashgabat, the line ends at Türkmenbaşy, Turkmenistan, a port on the Caspian Sea.

Since 2013, the Trans-Caspian International Transport Route has been operating, which goes through the territory of Kazakhstan to the Port Kuryk, then through the Caspian Sea to Azerbaijan (Ələt), then to Georgia, and from the Georgian Poti Sea Port through the Black Sea to the countries of the European Union. After the Russian invasion of Ukraine and the disruption of previous routes, this route became more relevant.

In 1996 a branch railway from Tejen was constructed across the border with Iran (at Serakhs) and linked to the Islamic Republic of Iran Railways. The link potentially enables rail freight from China to reach ports on the Persian Gulf and via other train lines, to reach into the Caucasus and Turkey. In 2016, direct container train service was inaugurated on this route, between Yiwu (Zhejiang Province) and Teheran; the trip takes 14 days.

The central Asian route did not extend all the way into Europe until October 2013 when the rail link across the Bosphorus though the Marmaray link was opened. Iranian rail lines use 1,435 mm (4 ft 8 1/2 in) gauge, requiring freight cars transiting from China into Iran to change wheel gauges twice. The train ferry across Lake Van is also a capacity restriction.

Chinese state media claims that the New Eurasian Land/Continental Bridge extends from Lianyungang to Rotterdam, a distance of 11,870 kilometres (7,400 mi). The exact route used to connect the two cities, whether through Mongolia or Kazakhstan, however, is unclear.

=== Iron Silk Road via Turkey ===
An alternative way from China to Europe is via Turkey. The route from China follows Kazakhstan, Uzbekistan, Turkmenistan, Iran, and Turkey. Due to longer distance, insufficient service, and border crossings, this route has not regularly been used for direct transport from China to Europe.

However, work is underway to improve the viability of this route, such as the Marmaray project to connect Europe and Asia via a tunnel under the Bosphorus. After the completion of the project, a continuous run of trains will be possible between Asia and Europe, which is now done by rail ferry service. But the Marmaray tunnel may give a limited service to freight trains due to dense usage by public transport. On 7 November 2019 the first Chinese freight train through the Marmaray tunnel to Europe ran, from Xi’an using a Chinese locomotive. This demonstrated a China to Turkey transportation time reduced from a month to 12 days.

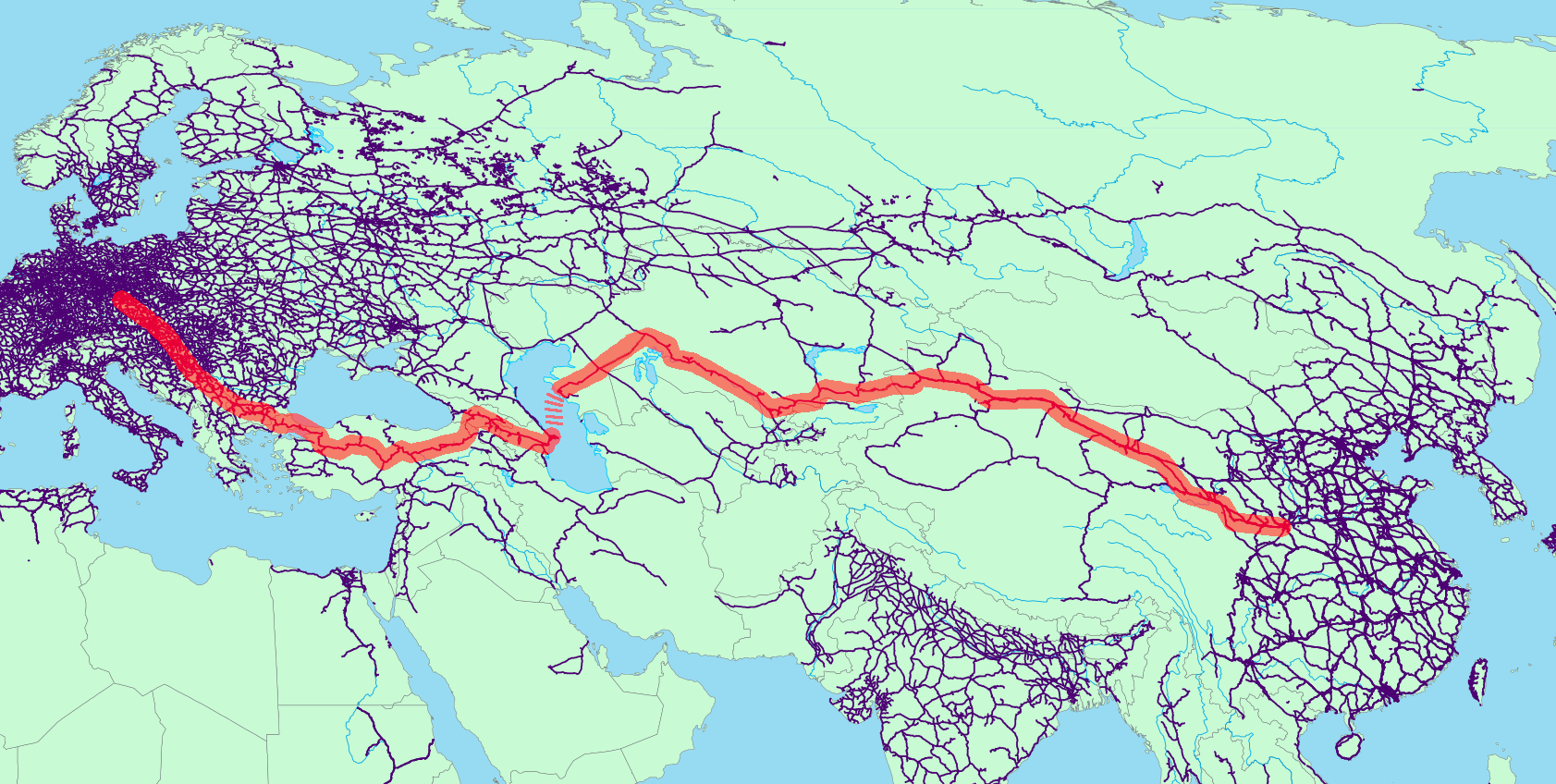
The train route from Xian to Prague

The Baku–Tbilisi–Kars railway also provides a route via the Caspian Sea by bypassing Iran, Uzbekistan and Turkmenistan. The new railway lines constructed in Kazakhstan will make it shorter. The new route, in this case, is China–Kazakhstan–Azerbaijan–Georgia–Turkey.

=== Break of gauge issues ===
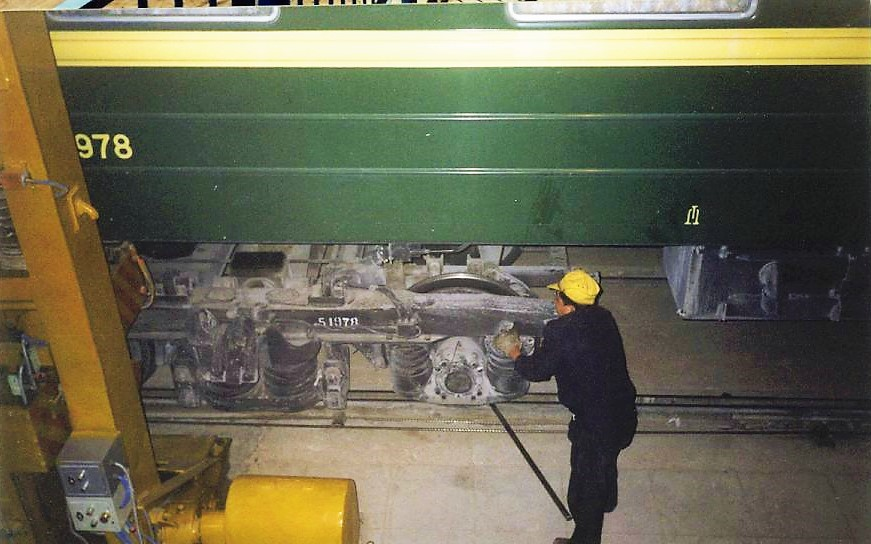
Changing wheelsets at the Sino-Mongolian border

The former countries of the Russian Empire and USSR, including Finland (which was a part of the Russian Empire between 1809 to 1917), as well as Mongolia, use a track gauge of 1,520 mm (4 ft 11 27/32 in). The international standard gauge used in most of Europe and China is 1,435 mm (4 ft 8 1/2 in). As a result, trains cannot run from China or European countries into or out of the former USSR without changing bogies. At most border crossings between the "Russian" and "standard" gauge territories (e.g., at Zabaykalsk or Erenhot) there are large facilities to change bogies. This takes hours, and needs special, heavy equipment. In many cases (especially containerized freight), freight is transshipped from one train to another instead of changing the bogies. As of 2016, this is the usual procedure with China-Europe container trains at places such as Khorgos; it is reported that containers can be moved from one train to another in as little as 47 minutes. In the case of liquids, frozen goods and hazardous materials, however, the bogies are usually changed.

It has been suggested that on some lines variable-gauge axles would achieve significant time savings in comparison to changing bogies. However, their fitting would involve a much higher capital cost, requiring either retrofitting or replacement of existing bogies.

== Proposed development ==
=== Expansion projects ===
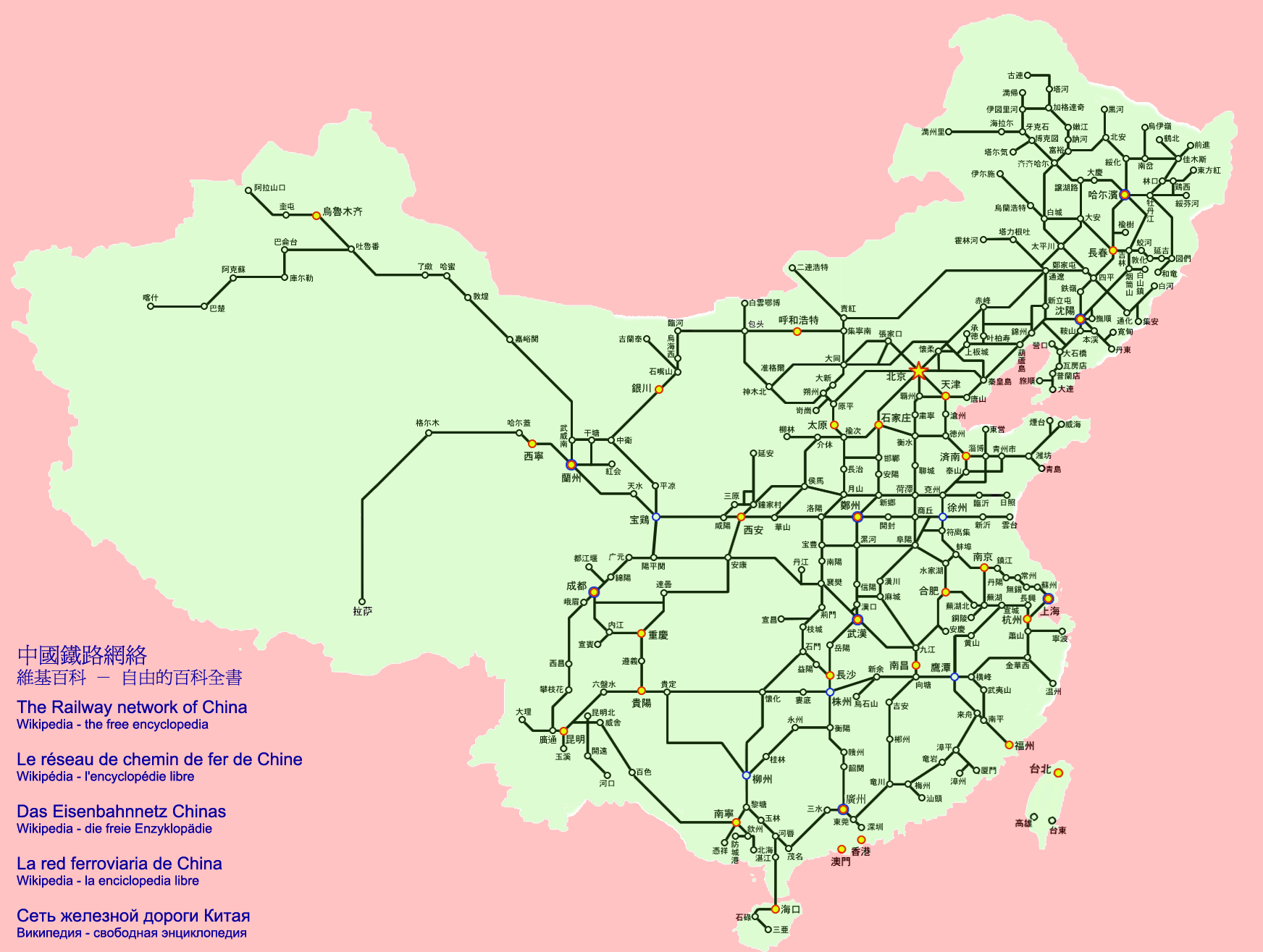
China's rail system as of 2008. The link with Kazakhstan is at the upper left corner of the map.

On 10 March 2004 the Kazakhstan Railway Company Ltd announced that it was looking for investors to fund the construction of a railway stretching 3,083 kilometres (1,920 mi) from China across Kazakhstan to the Caspian Sea that would be the same gauge as Chinese railways. Thus, the railway would allow trains from China to cross Kazakhstan without having to change bogies. The reported construction cost of the new railway was $3.5 billion. Chinese media reported that the railway would complete the link between China and Europe via central Asia, but it is unclear where the actual link to Europe would be. Also unclear is whether construction has yet to begin on the project.

The governments of India and Myanmar have proposed building, with China's cooperation, a link to the Eurasian Land Bridge that would start in India or Myanmar and connect to the Chinese rail system in Yunnan. The route would allow freight from India and Myanmar to travel overland to Europe. The link would also give rail access for China to the Indian Ocean. One proposed starting point for the route is Kyaukpyu. The governments of Thailand and Malaysia are also studying the feasibility of establishing rail links with China.

Both Russia and China are seeking to establish a permanent rail link with South Korea by way of North Korea to allow South Korean goods to be shipped to Europe via the Eurasian Land Bridge. According to Choi Yeon-Hye, a professor of marketing and management at the Korea National Railway College, a rail connection from Busan to Rotterdam would cut shipping time from 26 to 16 days and save $800 per container of freight. As part of its plan to link the Trans-Siberian to North and South Korea, Russia rebuilt its rail link from Khasan to Rajin, finishing in October 2011.

The South Korean government announced on 2 December 2009 that it would conduct an economic and technical study on the feasibility of constructing undersea tunnels for transporting goods and people to and from the country directly to Kyushu, Japan and Shandong, China.

The United Nations Development Programme has advocated greater regional integration along the Eurasian Land Bridge, including development of rail links between the countries of South and Southeast Asia and Central Asia, called the Trans-Asian Railway project. Chinese leaders have called for the establishment of free trade zones at both ends of the Eurasian Land Bridge to facilitate development. Said Khalid Malik, United Nations Resident Coordinator in China, "If this comes true, it will enable the continental bridge to play its due role in enhancing co-operation between Asia and Europe, and promoting world peace and development."

In 2010 and 2011, China announced plans to finance expansion of the rail systems in Laos, Thailand, Myanmar, Cambodia, and Vietnam and connect them to China's rail system via Kunming. The plans include construction of a high-speed rail line from Kunming to Vientiane, beginning in April 2011, with a possible future extension to Bangkok.

On 15 December 2011, Russian Prime Minister Vladimir Putin announced that a rail link was being considered between Sakhalin Island and Japan. The rail line, constructed in an undersea tunnel, would link Japan to the Trans-Siberian.

In 2024, the governments of China, Uzbekistan, and Kyrgyzstan agreed to build a 352-km rail link over the Torugart Pass, connecting Kashgar with the Trans-Caspian Railway via the Ferghana Valley, bypassing Kazakhstan. Construction of the Kyrgyzstan railway began in 2025.

=== Bering Strait link ===
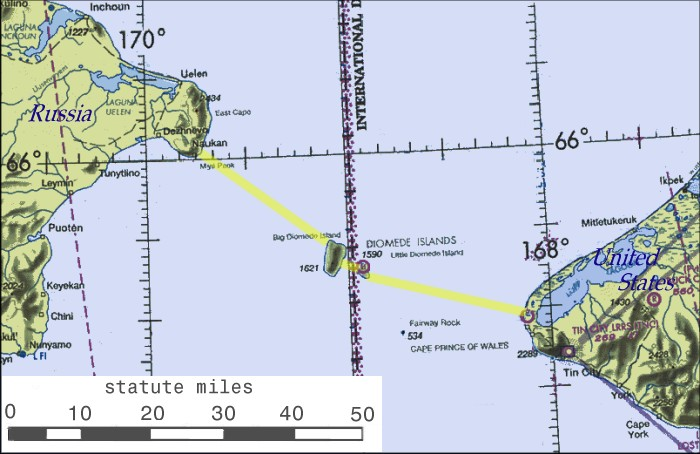
Possible route of a bridge or tunnel across the Bering Strait

In April 2007 the Russian government announced that it was considering building a double track broad gauge rail tunnel under the Bering Strait between Chukotka and Alaska. The tunnel, as projected, would be 100 km (60 mi) long and would include oil and gas pipelines, fiber optic cables and power lines. The tunnel project was estimated to cost $65 billion and to take between 15 and 20 years to build. In addition to the Russian government, proposed sponsors of the project apparently included Transneft and RAO United Energy Systems.

The project, as envisioned, would connect the Trans-Siberian via Komsomolsk-on-Amur/Yakutsk in Siberian Russia with the North American rail network (gauge to be widened) at Fort Nelson, British Columbia, Canada, a distance of 6,000 km (3,700 mi). A significant hurdle for the project is that the nearest major road to the Russian end of the tunnel is 1,600 km (1,000 mi) away. In addition, Alaska has no direct rail link either to Canada or to the contiguous United States. Other leaders, including Wally Hickel, Lyndon LaRouche, Sun Myung Moon, and the 14th Dalai Lama have also advocated the construction of a tunnel or bridge across the strait.

=== High-speed rail ===
It was reported in the press in March 2007 that China intends to build a high-speed rail link between China and Western Europe with the possibility of a high-speed rail journey from Beijing to London taking just two days.

In February 2011, the Chinese government announced that it would jointly sponsor the construction of a high-speed rail line between Astana and Almaty in Kazakhstan. The announced completion date was 2015.

== See also ==
- Belt and Road Initiative
- Eurasia Continental Bridge corridor
- List of international bridges

== General references ==
=== Print ===
- "Bering Strait tunnel proposed". The Pantagraph. Associated Press. 20 April 2007. p. A1.
- Batbayar, S. (8 April 2009). "Global crisis delays Mongolia-Europe rail freight project". Montsame.
- Berk, Michael (27 November 2007). "The Arctic Bridge; Churchill, Man., is the key to linking Afghans with the world". National Post. Canada. p. FP 15.
- Blomfield, Adrien (20 April 2007). "Kremlin revives plan for 60-mile tunnel to Alaska". The Daily Telegraph. p. 19.
- "A bridge too far?: Rev. Moon calls for billions to connect Alaska with Russia". Church & State. 10 November 2005. p. 19.
- DiBenedetto, Bill (3 September 2007). "Getting strait". Pacific Shipper.
- Economist Intelligence Unit (2008). "Resources and infrastructure: Transport, communications and the Internet". Country Profile: Mongolia.
- Fu, Jing (27 August 2004). "UN promotes role of Eurasian continental link". China Daily. p. 2.
- Christian, David (Spring 2000). "Silk Roads or Steppe Roads? The Silk Roads in World History". Journal of World History. 11 (1): 1. doi:10.1353/jwh.2000.0004. S2CID 18008906.
- Funabashi, Yoichi (24 December 2002). "Yoichi Funabashi at Vladivostok". Asahi Shimbun. Japan: Asahi Evening News. p. 1.
- Hearst, David (21 April 2007). "Readers' page: You asked...: Will a tunnel linking Russia to the US be built?". The Guardian. p. 40.
- International Railway Journal (March 2008). "Just 15 days after leaving Beijing, the first demonstration intermodal freight service operated by Eurasian Land Bridge between China and Germany arrived in Hamburg on January 24". p. 7.
- Mirak-Weissbach, Muriel (2 August 2000). "Iranian President's Visit to China Advances Strategic, Cultural Dialogue Part 1". Tehran Times.
- Nicholson, Alex (24 April 2007). "A tunnel under the Bering Strait? Russian, U.S. backers make a new push for a century-old idea". Financial Times.
- Ren, Daniel; Lilian Zhang; Will Clem (11 June 2009). "Jiangsu coast to act as catalyst for growth: Region will be turned into a transport hub". South China Morning Post. p. 5.
- Sciacca, Joe (10 September 2001). "Race for 9th District; As races go, Joe would've loved this one". Boston Herald. p. 4.
- "Third land link to Europe envisioned". The Statesman. 21 July 2009.
- Underhill, William (28 July 2008). "All Tickets, Please – As oil prices rise, businesses and consumers alike are ditching planes and cars for more-efficient rail". Newsweek.
- "Three Candidates Face Off in Bid For Incumbent Warner's Senate Seat; All Virginia Voters Will Decide Who Among The Candidates Will Begin Serving A Six-Year Term in January". The Virginian-Pilot. 3 November 2002.
- Wehrfritz, George; Eve Conant; B. J. Lee (13 August 2001). "The Coming Rail Boom – A Moscow-Pyongyang deal to extend the Trans-Siberian Railway could boost Eurasian commerce". Newsweek.
- "Experts propose developing SW corridor of third Asia-Europe land-bridge". Xinhua News Agency. 24 November 2008.
- "NW China mulls "New Silk Road" exhibition park". Xinhua. 1 July 2007.
- "China northwest city to host UN meet on Eurasia continental bridge 29 Jun-4 Jul". BBC Monitoring. Xinhua. 21 June 2007.
- "China: Congress deputies propose free trade zones along continental bridge". BBC Monitoring. Xinhua. 11 March 2004.

=== Web ===
- "New railway linking China, Europe to be built". China Daily. Publicity Department of the Chinese Communist Party. 18 March 2004.
- Economic and Social Commission for Asia and the Pacific. "Development of The Trans-Asian Railway; Trans-Asian railway in the north-south corridor; Northern Europe to the Persian Gulf" (PDF). United Nations. pp. 56–58. Archived from the original (PDF) on 7 June 2011.
- Islam, Zahedul (7 November 2006). "Trans-Asia Railway Network Agreement: Dhaka fails to sign deal for lack of cabinet approval". New Age. World Prout Assembly.
- "South Korea to study undersea tunnel to Kyushu". The Japan Times. Kyodo News. 3 December 2009.
- Ōtsuka, Shigeru (September 2001). "Central Asia's Rail Network and the Eurasian Land Bridge" (PDF). Japan Railway and Transport Review. East Japan Railway Culture Foundation. Archived from the original (PDF) on 22 November 2009.
- Qazwini, Iqbal (23 January 2003). "Major International Crises Need a Giant Project to Overcome Them" (Google translation of an Arabic newspaper article). Asharq Al-Awsat. H.H. Saudi Research & Marketing (UK) Ltd.
- Rodrigue, Jean-Paul (1998–2009). "The Northern East-West Freight Corridor (Eurasian Landbridge)". The Geography of Transport Systems. Department of Global Studies & Geography, Hofstra University. Archived from the original on 14 April 2009.
- "Bering bridge idea to highlight rally". The Washington Times. 25 June 2005.

== Further information ==
- Qi, Yong; Yan Wang (December 1991). "Analysis of Land Bridge Transportation". Chinese Geographical Science. 1 (4). Science Press: 337–346. Bibcode:1991ChGpS...1..337Q. doi:10.1007/BF02664482. S2CID 129322647.
- Thuermer, Karen E. (12 February 1995). "Sea-Land Makes Landbridge Rail Commitment to Former Soviet Union". Knight Ridder/Tribune Business News. Archived from the original on 2 November 2012 – via HighBeam Research.
