= Trans-Caspian International Transport Route =

Trade route from Southeast Asia and China to Europe

Logo of the Trans-Caspian International Transport Route

Map of the Trans-Caspian International Transport Route

The Middle Corridor, also called the Trans-Caspian International Transport Route (TITR), is a trade route from Southeast Asia and China to Europe via Kazakhstan, the Caspian Sea (using train ferries to cross the Caspian), Azerbaijan, Georgia and Turkey. It is an alternative to the Northern Corridor through Russia further to north, and the Ocean Route via the Suez Canal further to the south. Geographically, the Middle Corridor is the shortest route between Western China and Europe. It is undergoing major developments in parts, with the Trans-Kazakhstan railroad completed in 2014 and the Baku–Tbilisi–Kars (BTK) railway operational in 2017.

In 2022, the Middle Corridor's cargo doubled to 1.5 million tons, while the Northern Route's shipping volume declined by 34%. However, obstacles to the further use of the Middle Corridor include the limited capacities of seaports and railways, the absence of a unified tariff structure and single operator, and the alignment of geopolitics along the route.

Since the Russo-Ukrainian war began in February 2014, cargo traffic in the Middle Corridor has grown to nearly 3.2 million tons in 2022 as goods shifted from the Northern Corridor. Turkey positions itself as a key player between China and Europe through the Organization of Turkic States for the Middle Corridor, with cargo transportation increasing six-fold in the last decade. Since 2022, China also increased its involvement in the Middle Corridor projects, signing agreements with Kazakhstan, Georgia, and Azerbaijan, to develop infrastructure along the route.

== See also ==
- TRACECA
- China–Central Asia–West Asia Economic Corridor
- Baku–Tbilisi–Kars railway
- Stadler FLIRT
- Zangezur corridor
- Crossroads of Peace
